= Wisconsin's Lafayette County 2nd Assembly district =

Former American legislative district

Wisconsin's Lafayette County 2nd State Assembly district
- Obsolete
- Notes: 1848–1871; 1876–1888

Wisconsin's Lafayette County 2nd Assembly district was a district in the Wisconsin State Assembly for most of the history of the state of Wisconsin, up to the legislative redistricting reforms of 1972 which created the current numbered districts. Located in southern Wisconsin, the district was one of the 66 original Assembly districts defined in Article XIV of the Constitution of Wisconsin. The Constitution originally allocated two districts for Lafayette County, Wisconsin; this district originally comprised the eastern and southern parts of Lafayette County.

The district was in use for elections from 1848 to 1870, then again from 1876 to 1886.

== List of representatives ==
List of representatives from the Lafayette County 2nd district
Member	Party	Residence	Term start	Term end	Leg.
District created
Elias Slothower	Dem.	Gratiot	June 5, 1848	January 1, 1849	1st
William Hill	Dem.	New Diggings	January 1, 1849	January 7, 1850	2nd
John K. Williams	Dem.	Shullsburg	January 7, 1850	January 6, 1851	3rd
Samuel Cole	Dem.	Gratiot	January 6, 1851	January 5, 1852	4th
James Earnest	Whig	Shullsburg	January 5, 1852	January 3, 1853	5th
Philemon Simpson	Dem.	Shullsburg	January 3, 1853	January 2, 1854	6th
James H. Knowlton	Dem.	Shullsburg	January 2, 1854	January 1, 1855	7th
A. A. Townsend	Rep.	Shullsburg	January 1, 1855	January 7, 1856	8th
Hamilton H. Gray	Dem.	Shullsburg	January 7, 1856	January 5, 1857	9th
Henry Winslow Barnes	Dem.	Wiota	January 5, 1857	January 4, 1858	10th
Charles Bracken	Dem.	Mineral Point	January 4, 1858	January 3, 1859	11th
William McGranahan	Dem.	Fayette	January 3, 1859	January 2, 1860	12th
Samuel Cole	Dem.	Gratiot	January 2, 1860	January 7, 1861	13th
Lloyd T. Pullen	Rep.	Argyle	January 7, 1861	January 6, 1862	14th
James Wadsworth	Dem.	Darlington	January 6, 1862	January 1, 1863	15th
Lloyd T. Pullen	Rep.	Argyle	January 1, 1863	January 4, 1864	16th
Samuel Cole	Union	Gratiot	January 4, 1864	January 2, 1865	17th
Sylvester W. Osborn	Union	Darlington	January 2, 1865	January 1, 1866	18th
John Armstrong	Union	Wiota	January 1, 1866	January 7, 1867	19th
William Monroe	Union	Fayette	January 7, 1867	January 6, 1868	20th
Samuel Cole	Rep.	Gratiot	January 6, 1868	January 4, 1869	21st
Norman B. Richardson	Rep.	Warren	January 4, 1869	January 3, 1870	22nd
Henry Winslow Barnes	Dem.	Wiota	January 3, 1870	January 1, 1872	23rd 24th
District abolished by 1871 Wisconsin Act 156; Lafayette County was consolidated as a single-county Assembly district
District re-established by 1876 Wisconsin Act 343
James Earnest	Dem.	Shullsburg	January 1, 1877	January 7, 1878	30th
Bernard McGinty	Dem.	Kendall	January 7, 1878	January 6, 1879	31st
John Wilford Blackstone Jr.	Rep.	Shullsburg	January 6, 1879	January 5, 1880	32nd
Bernard McGinty	Dem.	Kendall	January 5, 1880	January 3, 1881	33rd
Thomas Bainbridge	Rep.	Benton	January 3, 1881	January 2, 1882	34th
John O'Neill	Dem.	Shullsburg	January 2, 1882	January 5, 1885	35th 36th
Charles Priestley	Dem.	Shullsburg	January 5, 1885	January 3, 1887	37th
James W. Freeman	Rep.	Shullsburg	January 3, 1887	January 7, 1889	38th
District abolished by 1887 Wisconsin Act 461; Lafayette and Green counties were organized into the Green–Lafayette 1st, Green–Lafayette 2nd, and Green–Lafayette 3rd Assembly districts
