= 1851 United States Senate election in Wisconsin =

- January 20, 1851
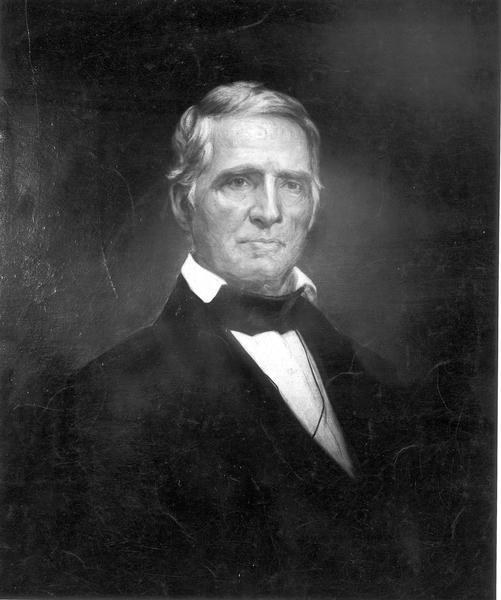

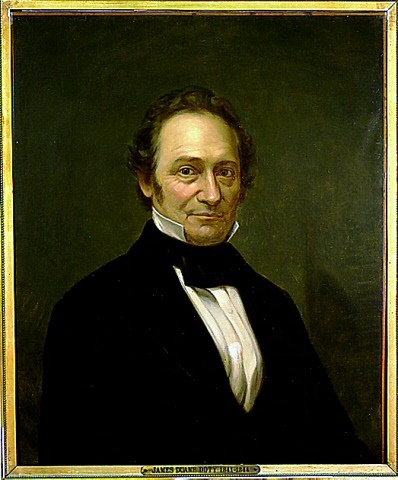
Nominee	Henry Dodge	James Duane Doty	Others
Party	Democratic	Independent Democrat
Legislative vote	69	7	7
Percentage	83.13%	8.43%	8.43%
U.S. senator before election
Henry Dodge
Democratic
Elected U.S. Senator
Henry Dodge
Democratic

The 1851 United States Senate election in Wisconsin was held in the 4th Wisconsin Legislature on January 20, 1851. Incumbent Democratic U.S. senator Henry Dodge was re-elected to a full six-year term.

In the 1851 legislative session, Democrats held large majorities in both chambers and neither of the other parties bothered to make a formal nomination. The only real contest was in the Democratic caucuses, where Dodge narrowly won renomination.

== Major candidates ==
=== Democratic ===
- Henry Dodge, the incumbent U.S. senator, former governor of the Wisconsin Territory.
- James Duane Doty, incumbent U.S. representative of Wisconsin's 3rd congressional district, and former governor of the Wisconsin Territory.
- Charles Dunn, former chief justice of the Wisconsin Territory Supreme Court.
- Moses M. Strong, former speaker of the Wisconsin State Assembly.

== Results ==
=== Democratic nomination ===
The Democrats met in caucus on January 19 to select a nominee. Three Democrats were absent from the caucus, but they were joined by Free Soiler George Gale, who afterward became a Democrat. In the initial informal poll, Dodge had the support of only 22 of 61 legislators. His nearest opponent was Moses Strong, with 17 votes. Strong had been speaker of the previous session of the Assembly, and was considered the candidate of the western region of the state; Strong had also been instrumental in the maneuvering to rescind the resolution that had called for the resignation of U.S. senator Isaac P. Walker, seen as an effort to court Walker's eastern constituency.

Over the course of the evening, Dodge's vote count gradually crept up, while Strong faded. Dodge won the nomination on the fourth ballot with just 31 of 61 votes. As it turned out, George Gale's vote in the caucus proved decisive.

=== Official vote ===
1st Vote of the 4th Wisconsin Legislature, January 20, 1851
Party	Candidate	Votes	%
Democratic	Henry Dodge (incumbent)	69 (Note: Dodge received the votes of all Democrats except senators Orson S. Head and Harvey G. Turner (who were absent), and representative Morris S. Barnett (who voted for Doty); he received cross-over votes from Free Soil senator George Gale, Whig senator John H. Rountree, Free Soil representatives Edward Eastman and Elijah Easton, and Whig representatives Henry C. Hemingway, Julius Hulburt, Nathan Olmsted, John D. Seaver, and William E. Smith.)	83.13%
Independent Democrat	James Duane Doty	7 (Note: Doty received the votes of Free Soil senator Stephen O. Bennett, Democratic representative Morris S. Barnett, and Free Soil representatives Obed Hale, Wyman Spooner, James Tinker, William L. Utley, and Peter Van Vliet.)	8.43%
Whig	Alexander L. Collins	3 (Note: Collins received votes from Whig representatives Henry Johnson, William F. Tompkins, and Charles Waldo.)	3.61%
Whig	Rufus King	2 (Note: King received votes from Whig representatives Enoch Chase and Edward Vincent.)	2.41%
Free Soil	Warren Chase	1 (Note: Chase received a vote from Free Soil representative Adam E. Ray.)	1.20%
Whig	John B. Terry	1 (Note: Terry received a vote from Whig senator Levi Sterling.)	1.20%
	Absent	2	
Majority		42	50.60%
Total votes		83	97.65%
Democratic hold			
