= 4th Wisconsin Legislature =

Wisconsin legislative term for 1851

←	3rd	5th	→
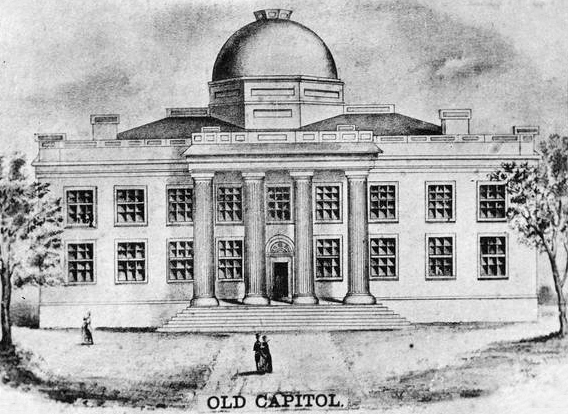
- Wisconsin State Capitol, 1855

Overview
- Legislative body: Wisconsin Legislature
- Meeting place: Wisconsin State Capitol
- Term: January 6, 1851 – January 5, 1852
- Election: November 5, 1850

Senate
- Members: 19
- Senate President: Samuel Beall
- President pro tempore: Duncan Reed
- Party control: Democratic

Assembly
- Members: 66
- Assembly Speaker: Frederick W. Horn
- Party control: Democratic

Sessions
- 1st: January 8, 1851 – March 17, 1851

The Fourth Wisconsin Legislature convened in regular session from January 8, 1851, to March 17, 1851. Senators representing odd-numbered districts were newly elected for this session and served the first year of a two-year term. Assembly members were elected to a one-year term. Assembly members and odd-numbered senators were elected in the general election on November 5, 1850. Senators representing even-numbered districts were serving the second year of their two-year term, having been elected in the general election held on November 6, 1849.

The governor of Wisconsin during this entire term was Democrat Nelson Dewey, of Grant County, serving the second year of his second two-year term, having won re-election in the 1849 Wisconsin gubernatorial election.

== Major events ==
- January 20, 1851: Henry Dodge re-elected United States Senator by the Wisconsin Legislature in joint session.
- November 4, 1851: Leonard J. Farwell elected Governor of Wisconsin.

== Major legislation ==
- January 22, 1851: Joint resolution in relation to the Honorable Isaac P. Walker, 1851 Joint Resolution 1
- February 1, 1851: Act to incorporate the Fire Department of the City of Milwaukee, 1851 Act 26
- February 4, 1851: Act providing for the election of a Chief Justice, 1851 Act 39
- February 6, 1851: Act to set apart and incorporate the County of Oconto, 1851 Act 44
- February 11, 1851: Act to set apart and incorporate Door County, 1851 Act 66
- February 15, 1851: Act to set apart and incorporate the County of Waushara, 1851 Act 77
- February 17, 1851: Act to incorporate the County of Waupaca, 1851 Act 78
- February 17, 1851: Act to divide the county of Brown and create the county of Outagamie, 1851 Act 83
- March 10, 1851: Act to prevent the killing of deer in certain months of the year, 1851 Act 171
- March 11, 1851: Act to change the name of the town of "Pike" in Kenosha county to "Somers," 1851 Act 211

== Party summary ==
=== Senate summary ===
Senate partisan composition Democratic: 14 seats Free Soil: 2 seats Whig: 3 seats

	Party (Shading indicates majority caucus)			Total	
	Democratic	Free Soil	Whig	Total	Vacant
End of previous Legislature	13	2	4	19	0
1st Session	14	2	3	19	0
Final voting share	73.68%	10.53%	15.79%		
Beginning of the next Legislature	12	1	6	19	0

=== Assembly summary ===
Assembly partisan composition Democratic: 49 seats Free Soil: 7 seats Whig: 10 seats

	Party (Shading indicates majority caucus)			Total	
	Democratic	Free Soil	Whig	Total	Vacant
End of previous Legislature	43	8	15	66	0
1st Session	49	7	10	66	0
Final voting share	74.24%	10.61%	15.15%		
Beginning of the next Legislature	29	6	31	66	0

== Sessions ==
- 1st Regular session: January 8, 1851–March 17, 1851

== Leaders ==
=== Senate leadership ===
- President of the Senate: Samuel Beall, Lieutenant Governor
- President pro tempore: Duncan Reed

=== Assembly leadership ===
- Speaker of the Assembly: Frederick W. Horn

== Members ==
=== Members of the Senate ===
Members of the Wisconsin Senate for the Fourth Wisconsin Legislature:

Senate partisan representation Democratic: 14 seats Free Soil: 2 seats Whig: 3 seats

District	Counties	Senator	Party	Residence
01	Brown, Calumet, Manitowoc, Sheboygan	Theodore Conkey	Dem.	Appleton
02	Columbia, Marathon, Marquette, Portage, Sauk, Waushara	G. DeGraw Moore	Whig	Prairie du Sac
03	Crawford, Chippewa, St. Croix, La Pointe	Hiram A. Wright	Dem.	Prairie du Chien
04	Fond du Lac, Winnebago	John A. Eastman	Dem.	Fond du Lac
05	Iowa, Richland	Levi Sterling	Whig	Mineral Point
06	Grant	John H. Rountree	Whig	Platteville
07	Lafayette	Samuel G. Bugh	Dem.	Shullsburg
08	Green	William Rittenhouse	Dem.	Monroe
09	Dane	Eliab B. Dean Jr.	Dem.	Madison
10	Dodge	James Giddings	Dem.	Chester
11	Washington	Harvey G. Turner	Dem.	Ozaukee
12	Jefferson	Peter H. Turner	Dem.	Palmyra
13	Waukesha	George Hyer	Dem.	Waukesha
14	Walworth	George Gale	Free Soil	Elkhorn
15	Rock	Andrew Palmer	Dem.	Janesville
16	Kenosha	Orson S. Head	Dem.	Kenosha
17	Racine	Stephen O. Bennett	Free Soil	Racine
18	Milwaukee (Southern Half)	Duncan Reed	Dem.	Milwaukee
19	Milwaukee (Northern Half)	Francis Huebschmann	Dem.	Milwaukee

=== Members of the Assembly ===
Members of the Assembly for the Fourth Wisconsin Legislature:

Assembly partisan representation Democratic: 49 seats Free Soil: 7 seats Whig: 10 seats

Senate District	County	District	Representative	Party	Residence
01	Brown		John F. Lessey	Dem.	Green Bay
01	Calumet		William H. Dick	Dem.	Brothertown
02	Columbia		William T. Bradley	Dem.	Leeds
03	Crawford & Chippewa		William T. Price	Dem.	Black River Falls
09	Dane	1	Abram A. Boyce	Dem.	Lodi
09	Dane	2	Augustus A. Bird	Dem.	Madison
09	Dane	3	Gabriel Bjornson	Dem.	Perry
10	Dodge	1	John Muzzy	Dem.	Mayville
10	Dodge	2	Asa W. French	Dem.	Herman
10	Dodge	3	Charles B. Whitton	Dem.	Ashippun
10	Dodge	4	John Lowth	Dem.	Lowell
10	Dodge	5	William E. Smith	Whig	Fox Lake
04	Fond du Lac	1	Charles L. Julius	Dem.	Calumet
04	Fond du Lac	2	Morris S. Barnett	Dem.	Eldorado
06	Grant	1	James B. Johnson	Dem.	Fairplay
06	Grant	2	John N. Jones	Dem.	Platteville
06	Grant	3	William R. Biddlecome	Dem.	Potosi
06	Grant	4	Robert M. Briggs	Whig	Beetown
08	Green		Julius Hulburt	Whig	Albany
05	Iowa & Richland	1	Richard J. Tregaskis	Dem.	Mineral Point
05	Iowa & Richland	2	Charles Rodolf	Dem.	Highland
12	Jefferson	1	Patrick Rogan	Dem.	Watertown
12	Jefferson	2	Samuel T. Clothier	Dem.	Cold Spring
12	Jefferson	3	Alonzo Wing	Dem.	Jefferson
16	Kenosha	1	Henry Johnson	Whig	Somers
16	Kenosha	2	Obed Hale	Free Soil	Paris
03	La Pointe & St Croix		John O. Henning	Dem.	Hudson
07	Lafayette	1	Nathan Olmsted	Whig	Cottage Inn
07	Lafayette	2	Samuel Cole	Dem.	Gratiot
01	Manitowoc		G. C. Oscar Malmros	Dem.	Manitowoc
02	Marathon & Portage		Thomas J. Morman	Dem.	Stevens Point
02	Marquette & Waushara		Charles Waldo	Whig	Kingston
19	Milwaukee	1	William K. Wilson	Dem.	Milwaukee
19	Milwaukee	2	Charles E. Jenkins	Dem.	Milwaukee
18	Milwaukee	3	John L. Doran	Dem.	Milwaukee
18	Milwaukee	4	George H. Walker	Dem.	Milwaukee
18	Milwaukee	5	Patrick Carney	Dem.	Milwaukee
18	Milwaukee	6	Enoch Chase	Whig	Milwaukee
19	Milwaukee	7	Tobias G. Osborne	Dem.	Milwaukee
17	Racine	1	William L. Utley	Free Soil	Racine
17	Racine	2	Peter Van Vliet	Free Soil	Caledonia
17	Racine	3	James Tinker	Free Soil	Dover
15	Rock	1	William F. Tompkins	Whig	Janesville
15	Rock	2	John Bannister	Dem.	Beloit
15	Rock	3	John D. Seaver	Whig	Cooksville
15	Rock	4	Edward Vincent	Whig	Milton
15	Rock	5	Joseph Kinney Jr.	Dem.	Lima
02	Sauk		Nathaniel Perkins	Dem.	Sauk City
01	Sheboygan	1	Albert D. La Due	Dem.	Sheboygan
01	Sheboygan	2	John D. Murphy	Dem.	Sheboygan Falls
14	Walworth	1	Adam E. Ray	Free Soil	Troy
14	Walworth	2	Henry C. Hemingway	Whig	Richmond
14	Walworth	3	Experience Estabrook	Dem.	Whitewater
14	Walworth	4	Elijah Easton	Free Soil	Walworth
14	Walworth	5	Wyman Spooner	Free Soil	Elkhorn
11	Washington	1	Harvey Moore	Dem.	Ozaukee
11	Washington	2	Frederick W. Horn	Dem.	Cedarburg
11	Washington	3	Frederick Stock	Dem.	Mequon
11	Washington	4	John C. Toll	Dem.	Cedar Creek
11	Washington	5	Francis Everley Jr.	Dem.	West Bend
13	Waukesha	1	Aaron V. Groot	Dem.	Brookfield
13	Waukesha	2	Peter D. Gifford	Dem.	North Prairie
13	Waukesha	3	Hosea Fuller Jr.	Dem.	Pewaukee
13	Waukesha	4	William A. Cone	Dem.	New Berlin
13	Waukesha	5	John C. Snover	Dem.	Eagle
04	Winnebago		Edward Eastman	Free Soil	Oshkosh

== Employees ==
=== Senate employees ===
- Chief Clerk: William Hull
- Sergeant-at-Arms: Enias D. Masters

=== Assembly employees ===
- Chief Clerk: Alexander T. Gray
- Sergeant-at-Arms: Charles S. Kingsbury
