= Samuel Cole (Wisconsin pioneer) =

19th century American politician

Member of the Wisconsin Senate from the 13th district
- In office January 2, 1865 – January 7, 1867
- Preceded by: James Earnest
- Succeeded by: James Earnest
- In office January 7, 1861 – January 5, 1863
- Preceded by: Philemon Simpson
- Succeeded by: James Earnest

Member of the Wisconsin State Assembly from the Lafayette 2nd district
- In office January 6, 1868 – January 4, 1869
- Preceded by: William Monroe
- Succeeded by: Norman B. Richardson
- In office January 4, 1864 – January 2, 1865
- Preceded by: Lloyd T. Pullen
- Succeeded by: Sylvester W. Osborn
- In office January 2, 1860 – January 7, 1861
- Preceded by: William M. McGranahan
- Succeeded by: Lloyd T. Pullen
- In office January 6, 1851 – January 5, 1852
- Preceded by: John K. Williams
- Succeeded by: James Earnest

Personal details
- Born: February 8, 1815 Stanstead, Lower Canada
- Died: September 8, 1885 (aged 70) Gratiot, Wisconsin, U.S.
- Resting place: Gratiot Cemetery, Gratiot, Wisconsin
- Party: Republican (after 1866); Natl. Union (1862–1866); Democratic (before 1862)
- Spouse: Jane Connery (m. 1841–1885)
- Children: Mary Jane (Campbell)^{(b. 1842; died 1916)}; Sarah Ann (Cook)^{(b. 1845; died 1922)}; Edwin Witson Cole^{(b. 1849; died 1904)}; Emmett J. Cole^{(b. 1851; died 1915)}
- Occupation: Blacksmith, farmer

Samuel Cole IV (February 8, 1815 – September 8, 1885) was an American mechanic, politician, and Wisconsin pioneer. He served four years in each house of the Wisconsin Legislature, representing Lafayette County. He was a member of the Wisconsin Senate in 1861, 1862, 1865, and 1866, and was a member of the State Assembly in 1851, 1860, 1864, and 1868.

== Biography ==
Samuel Cole was born in what is now Stanstead, Quebec, in the domain then known as Lower Canada. His family was from Vermont, but he was born when they were living on the Canada side of the border.

He learned the blacksmith trade as a young man and came to the Wisconsin Territory in 1838. He settled in what is now the town of Gratiot, Wisconsin, in Lafayette County, where he resided for the rest of his life. He opened a blacksmith shop shortly after arriving.

In 1847, he served on the first grand jury of Lafayette County, and then served as the first chairman of the town of Gratiot. He served on the last board of county commissioners in 1848, and—as chairman of Gratiot—he was ex officio a member of the first board of county supervisors in 1849—the at-large commissioner system was replaced by the district-based supervisor system. He went on to serve five more terms as town chairman—and therefore five more terms on the county board—in the next decade. He was also chosen as the first justice of the peace in Gratiot, and served at least 30 years in that office.

During that decade, he also won his first term in the Wisconsin State Assembly, running on the Democratic Party ticket. He represented roughly the south and east parts of the county in the 1851 session. He next ran for state office in 1859, running for Assembly again. Redistricting had taken place in 1856, and his district for this term comprised roughly the eastern half of the county. The following year, he was the Democratic nominee for Wisconsin Senate in the 13th Senate district, which then comprised all of Lafayette County. He defeated Republican former state representative A. A. Townsend in the general election, and went on to serve in Senate for the 1861 and 1862 legislative sessions.

After the start of the American Civil War, Cole became affiliated with the National Union coalition and never returned to the Democratic Party. He was elected to his third term in the Assembly in 1863, running on the Union ticket. He defeated Democrat J. B. Parkinson.

The following year, he ran for another term in the Wisconsin Senate, and was elected on the Union ticket, defeating the Democratic incumbent James Earnest. The 1864 election sparked a controversy, and his opponent formally contested the results, challenging the validity of some of the soldiers' absentee votes. The Senate, which then had a substantial Union majority, delayed hearing the challenge until March, and ultimately ruled in Cole's favor.

Cole sought renomination for another term in the Senate in 1866, but the convention instead chose Allen Warden. He returned a year later, however, and was the Republican Party nominee for State Assembly again. His district again comprised roughly the eastern half of the county. (Note: The 1868 Legislative Manual and therefore all of the annals and records based on that document say that he represented Lafayette County's 1st Assembly district in this session, but contemporaneous newspaper records show that is most likely an error. Cole was always a resident of Gratiot, which was explicitly within the boundaries of the 2nd Assembly district. The other Assemblyman for this term was a resident of Shullsburg, which is in the western (1st) district. Newspapers around the time of the election also refer to Cole's district as the "eastern" district.) He defeated Democrat Elias Slothower in the general election.

Cole did not run for state office again after serving in the 1868 legislative session, but remained active in the Republican Party of Wisconsin for most of the rest of his life.

He contracted Typhoid fever in January 1885, and suffered the lingering effects of the disease for several months. He died at his home in Gratiot on September 8, 1885.

== Personal life and family ==
Samuel Cole IV was one of at least eight children born to Samuel Cole III and his second wife Sarah (née Hartshorn). Samuel Cole III served as a sergeant in the New Hampshire militia during the American Revolutionary War. The Coles were direct descendants of Thomas Cole, who came to the Massachusetts Bay Colony from England in the 1640s.

Samuel Cole IV married Jane Connery, an Irish American immigrant, in April 1841 at Gratiot. They had at least four children. Their eldest daughter, Mary, married Francis Campbell, who also represented the Gratiot area in the Wisconsin State Assembly. Cole tragically shot his son in a hunting accident in 1868, resulting in the loss of his eye.

== Notes ==
Wisconsin State Assembly
Preceded by John K. Williams	Member of the Wisconsin State Assembly from the Lafayette 2nd district January 6, 1851 – January 5, 1852	Succeeded by James Earnest
Preceded by William M. McGranahan	Member of the Wisconsin State Assembly from the Lafayette 2nd district January 2, 1860 – January 7, 1861	Succeeded by Lloyd T. Pullen
Preceded by Lloyd T. Pullen	Member of the Wisconsin State Assembly from the Lafayette 2nd district January 4, 1864 – January 2, 1865	Succeeded by Sylvester W. Osborn
Preceded by William Monroe	Member of the Wisconsin State Assembly from the Lafayette 2nd district January 6, 1868 – January 4, 1869	Succeeded by Norman B. Richardson
Wisconsin Senate
Preceded by Philemon Simpson	Member of the Wisconsin Senate from the 13th district January 7, 1861 – January 5, 1863	Succeeded by James Earnest
Preceded by James Earnest	Member of the Wisconsin Senate from the 13th district January 2, 1865 – January 7, 1867	Succeeded by James Earnest
