= 1869 Wisconsin lieutenant gubernatorial election =

- November 2, 1869
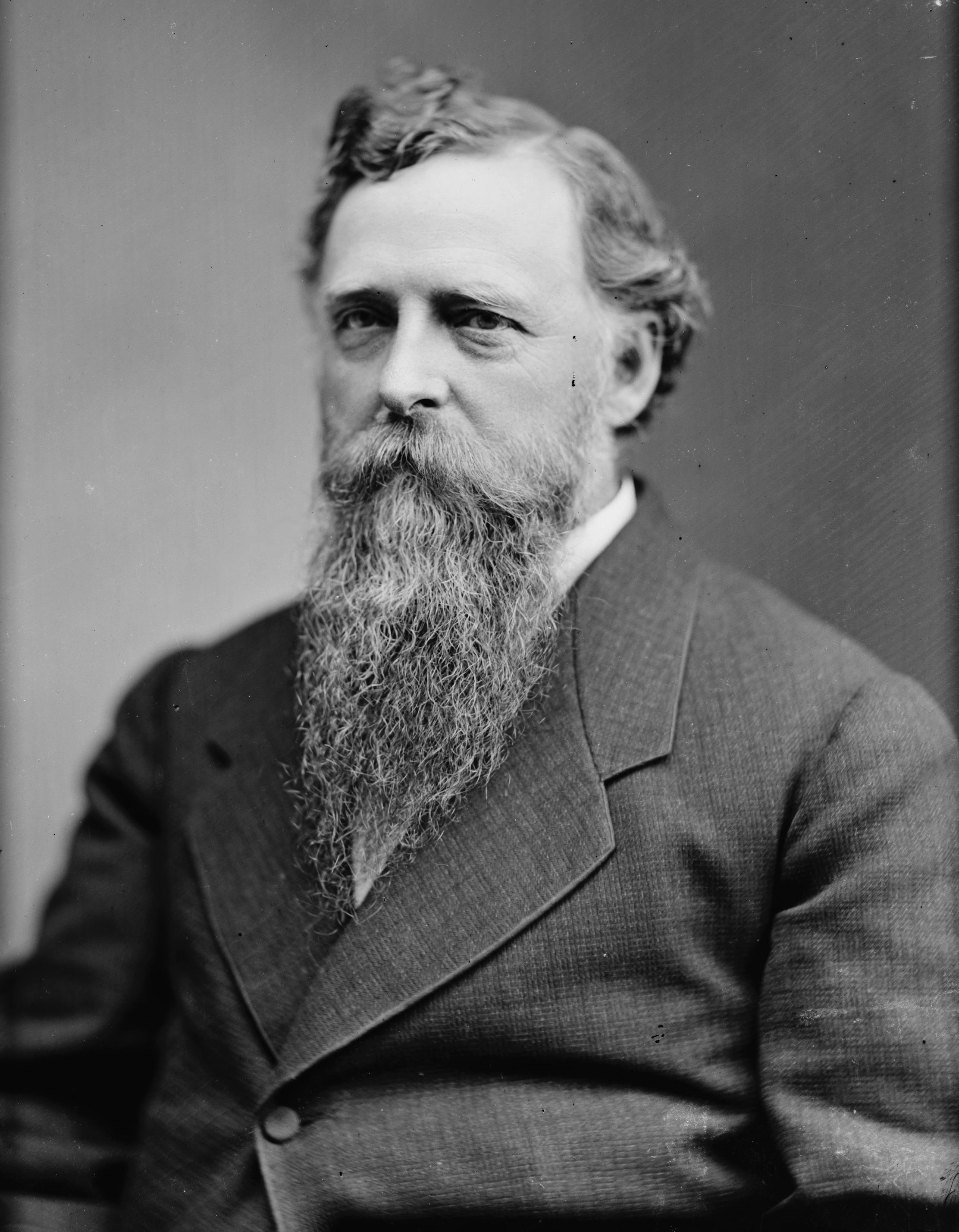

Nominee	Thaddeus C. Pound	Hamilton H. Gray
Party	Republican	Democratic
Popular vote	69,608	59,728
Percentage	53.29%	45.73%
Lieutenant Governor before election
Wyman Spooner
Republican
Elected Lieutenant Governor
Thaddeus C. Pound
Republican

The 1869 Wisconsin lieutenant gubernatorial election was held on November 2, 1869, in order to elect the lieutenant governor of Wisconsin. Republican nominee and incumbent member of the Wisconsin State Assembly Thaddeus C. Pound defeated Democratic nominee and incumbent member of the Wisconsin Senate Hamilton H. Gray.

== General election ==
On election day, November 2, 1869, Republican nominee Thaddeus C. Pound won the election by a margin of 9,880 votes against his opponent Democratic nominee Hamilton H. Gray, thereby retaining Republican control over the office of lieutenant governor. Pound was sworn in as the 10th lieutenant governor of Wisconsin on January 3, 1870.

=== Results ===
Wisconsin lieutenant gubernatorial election, 1869
Party	Candidate	Votes	%
Republican	Thaddeus C. Pound	69,608	53.29
Democratic	Hamilton H. Gray	59,728	45.73
	Scattering	1,284	0.98
Total votes		130,620	100.00
Republican hold			
