= Wisconsin's La Pointe–St. Croix Assembly district =

Former American legislative district

Wisconsin's La Pointe–St. Croix State Assembly district
- Obsolete
- Notes: 1848–1856

Wisconsin's La Pointe–St. Croix Assembly district was a district in the Wisconsin State Assembly in the early years of the history of the state of Wisconsin, prior to the legislative redistricting reforms of 1972 which created the current numbered districts. Located at the northwestern corner of Wisconsin, the district comprised all of what is now Ashland, Bayfield, Burnett, Douglas, Pierce, Polk, and St. Croix counties, along with roughly the western halves of Barron, Iron, and Washburn counties. It was one of the 66 original Assembly districts defined in Article XIV of the Constitution of Wisconsin.

The district was in use for elections from 1848 through 1855. Over the course of this district's existence, the territory originally belonging to La Pointe and St. Croix counties was gradually divided into Ashland, Burnett, Douglas, La Pointe, Pierce, Polk, and St. Croix counties, but the Assembly district boundaries did not change.

== List of representatives ==
List of representatives from the La Pointe–St. Croix district
Member	Party	Residence	Term start	Term end	Leg.
District created
William Rainey Marshall	Dem.	St. Croix Falls	June 5, 1848	June 6, 1848	1st
--Vacant--			June 6, 1848	June 13, 1848	1st
Joseph Bowron	Dem.	St. Croix Falls	June 13, 1848	January 1, 1849	1st
Joseph Bowron	Dem.	St. Croix Falls	January 1, 1849	January 7, 1850	2nd
John S. Watrous	Dem.	La Pointe	January 7, 1850	January 6, 1851	3rd
John O. Henning	Dem.	Hudson	January 6, 1851	January 5, 1852	4th
Otis W. Hoyt	Dem.	Hudson	January 5, 1852	January 3, 1853	5th
Orrin T. Maxson	Dem.	Prescott	January 3, 1853	January 2, 1854	6th
William M. Torbert	Dem.	Hudson	January 2, 1854	January 1, 1855	7th
Smith R. Gunn	Rep.	Prescott	January 1, 1855	January 7, 1856	8th
Almon D. Gray	Dem.	Hudson	January 7, 1856	January 5, 1857	9th
District abolished by 1856 Wisconsin Act 109; Pierce County became part of the Chippewa–Clark–Dunn–Pierce district The remainder of the district became the Ashland–Burnett–Douglas–La Pointe–Polk–St. Croix district
