= Edward Vincent =

Edward Vincent may refer to:

- Edward Vincent Jr. (1934–2012), legislator and mayor of Inglewood, California
  - Edward Vincent Jr. Park, formerly Centinela Park, a 55-acre recreation area in Inglewood, named after the mayor
- Edward A. Vincent (c. 1825–1856), architect, cartographer and civil engineer
- Edward F. Vincent (1881–1940), New York assemblyman
- Edward Vincent (Wisconsin politician) (1820–1875), state legislator and lawyer
