= Henry Winslow Barnes =

19th century American politician

Henry W. Barnes

Member of the Wisconsin State Assembly from the Lafayette 2nd district
- In office January 3, 1870 – January 1, 1872
- Preceded by: Charles Pole
- Succeeded by: Thomas Bainbridge (whole county)
- In office January 5, 1857 – January 4, 1858
- Preceded by: Matthew Murphy
- Succeeded by: Hamilton H. Gray

Sheriff of Lafayette County, Wisconsin
- In office January 1861 – January 1863
- Preceded by: Hugh Campbell
- Succeeded by: Hugh Campbell

Wisconsin Circuit Court Clerk for Lafayette County, Wisconsin
- In office January 1859 – January 1861
- Preceded by: David W. Kyle
- Succeeded by: James S. Murphy

Chairman of the Board of Supervisors of Lafayette County, Wisconsin
- In office January 1855 – January 1856
- Preceded by: Daniel Morgan Parkinson
- Succeeded by: Justus De Selhorst

Personal details
- Born: November 2, 1818 Bedford, New Hampshire, U.S.
- Died: September 1, 1873 (aged 54) Wiota, Wisconsin, U.S.
- Resting place: Miller Cemetery, Wiota, Wisconsin
- Party: Democratic
- Spouse: Louisa Lamb
- Children: Nathan E. Barnes^{(died 1883)}; Charles Theodore Barnes^{(b. 1849; died 1917)}

Henry Winslow Barnes (November 2, 1818 – September 1, 1873) was an American farmer, Democratic politician, and Wisconsin pioneer. He was a member of the Wisconsin State Assembly, representing Lafayette County in the 1857, 1870, and 1871 sessions.

== Biography ==
Henry W. Barnes was born in Bedford, New Hampshire, in November 1818. His father died when he was just seven years old. He came to the Wisconsin Territory in 1835, when he was just 17. He initially resided at Darlington, and was elected to the Lafayette County board of supervisors from Darlington in 1849. In the early 1850s he moved to the neighboring town of Wiota, Wisconsin, and was quickly elected chairman of the town board, serving from 1851 to 1859. During the same years, he was elected to six consecutive terms representing Wiota on the county board—from 1853 through 1858. He was also chosen as chairman of the county board in 1855.

In 1856, Barnes was elected on the Democratic Party ticket to serve in the Wisconsin State Assembly. He represented Lafayette County's 2nd Assembly district, which then comprised roughly the eastern half of the county. In 1858, he was elected clerk of the circuit court for Lafayette County, for a two year term, and he was then elected sheriff in 1860.

He was elected to two more terms in the Assembly, in 1869 and 1870, when he again represented Lafayette County's 2nd Assembly district. He then serve two final terms on the county board in 1871 and 1872.

Barnes died at his home in Wiota on September 1, 1873, after a long and painful illness.

== Personal life and family ==
Henry Winslow Barnes was the youngest of eight children born to Nathaniel Barnes and his wife Anna (née Rennick). Nathaniel Barnes was a captain in the New Hampshire militia, and had served as a selectman and constable in Bedford. The Barnes family were descended from Thomas Barnes, who emigrated from Hingham, Norfolk, to the Massachusetts Bay Colony in 1637.

Isaac O. Barnes was an older brother of Henry Winslow Barnes. He was a prominent lawyer and Democratic politician in Boston. He held the rank of colonel by appointment, and was appointed to several federal posts in Massachusetts, serving as a customs official, U.S. marshal, and finally U.S. pension agent.

== Electoral history ==
=== Wisconsin Assembly (1869, 1870) ===
Wisconsin Assembly, Lafayette 2nd District Election, 1869
Party	Candidate	Votes	%	±%
General Election, November 2, 1869
Democratic	Henry W. Barnes	891	54.46%	+21.92%
Republican	S. W. Osborn	745	45.54%	
Plurality		146	8.92%	
Total votes		1,636	100.0%	
Democratic hold				

Wisconsin Assembly, Lafayette 2nd District Election, 1870
Party	Candidate	Votes	%	±%
General Election, November 8, 1870
Democratic	Henry W. Barnes (incumbent)	1,064	50.52%	−3.94%
Republican	D. S. Hawley	1,042	49.48%	
Plurality		22	1.04%	-7.88%
Total votes		2,106	100.0%	+28.73%
Democratic hold				

Wisconsin State Assembly
Preceded by Matthew Murphy	Member of the Wisconsin State Assembly from the Lafayette 2nd district January 5, 1857 – January 4, 1858	Succeeded by Hamilton H. Gray
Preceded by Charles Pole	Member of the Wisconsin State Assembly from the Lafayette 2nd district January 3, 1870 – January 1, 1872	Succeeded by Thomas Bainbridge (whole county)
Political offices
Preceded by Daniel Morgan Parkinson	Chairman of the Board of Supervisors of Lafayette County, Wisconsin; January 1855 – January 1856	Succeeded by Justus De Selhorst
Legal offices
Preceded by David W. Kyle	Wisconsin Circuit Court Clerk for Lafayette County, Wisconsin; January 1859 – January 1861	Succeeded by James S. Murphy
Preceded by Hugh Campbell	Sheriff of Lafayette County, Wisconsin; January 1861 – January 1863	Succeeded by Hugh Campbell
