= Monticello, Wisconsin =

Monticello is the name of some places in the U.S. state of Wisconsin:

- Monticello, Green County, Wisconsin
- Monticello, Lafayette County, Wisconsin
