= Anson (CDP), Maine =

Anson, Maine
- Census-designated place
- Location within Maine Location within the United States
- Coordinates: 44°47′54″N 69°53′46″W
- Country: United States
- State: Maine
- County: Somerset

Area
  - Total: 1.36 sq mi (3.52 km^{2})
  - Land: 1.30 sq mi (3.36 km^{2})
  - Water: 0.062 sq mi (0.16 km^{2})
- Elevation: 276 ft (84 m)

Population (2020)
  - Total: 680
  - Density: 524.7/sq mi (202.59/km^{2})
- Time zone: UTC-5 (Eastern (EST))
  - Summer (DST): UTC-4 (EDT)
- ZIP Code: 04911
- Area code: 207
- FIPS code: 23-01360
- GNIS feature ID: 2377887

Anson is a census-designated place (CDP) in the town of Anson in Somerset County, Maine, United States. The population was 818 at the 2000 census.

== Geography ==
According to the United States Census Bureau, the CDP has a total area of 1.4 square miles (3.7 km^{2}), of which 1.3 square miles (3.4 km^{2}) is land and 0.1 square mile (0.2 km^{2}) (6.38%) is water.

== Demographics ==
Historical population
Census	Pop.	Note	%±
2020	680		—
U.S. Decennial Census

As of the census of 2000, there were 818 people, 324 households, and 204 families residing in the CDP. The population density was 619.4 inhabitants per square mile (239.2/km^{2}). There were 344 housing units at an average density of 260.5 per square mile (100.6/km^{2}). The racial makeup of the CDP was 97.31% White, 0.12% Native American, and 2.57% from two or more races. Hispanic or Latino of any race were 0.37% of the population.

There were 324 households, out of which 30.9% had children under the age of 18 living with them, 47.5% were married couples living together, 10.8% had a female householder with no husband present, and 37.0% were non-families. 29.3% of all households were made up of individuals, and 15.1% had someone living alone who was 65 years of age or older. The average household size was 2.50 and the average family size was 3.04.

In the CDP, the population was spread out, with 24.9% under the age of 18, 9.0% from 18 to 24, 30.3% from 25 to 44, 20.9% from 45 to 64, and 14.8% who were 65 years of age or older. The median age was 36 years. For every 100 females, there were 100.0 males. For every 100 females age 18 and over, there were 94.9 males.

The median income for a household in the CDP was $26,875, and the median income for a family was $36,250. Males had a median income of $25,875 versus $21,500 for females. The per capita income for the CDP was $12,910. About 11.8% of families and 20.2% of the population were below the poverty line, including 19.5% of those under age 18 and 19.7% of those age 65 or over.
