= James Earnest =

American politician from Wisconsin (1818–1900)

Member of the Wisconsin Senate from the 13th district
- In office January 7, 1867 – January 4, 1869
- Preceded by: Samuel Cole
- Succeeded by: Hamilton H. Gray
- In office January 5, 1863 – January 2, 1865
- Preceded by: Samuel Cole
- Succeeded by: Samuel Cole

Member of the Wisconsin State Assembly
- In office January 1, 1877 – January 7, 1878
- Preceded by: Danverse Neff (Lafayette County)
- Succeeded by: Bernard McGinty
- Constituency: Lafayette 2nd
- In office January 5, 1857 – January 3, 1859
- Preceded by: Hamilton H. Gray
- Succeeded by: David W. Kyle
- Constituency: Lafayette 3rd
- In office January 2, 1854 – January 7, 1856
- Preceded by: Eli Robinson
- Succeeded by: Matthew Murphy
- Constituency: Lafayette 1st
- In office January 5, 1852 – January 3, 1853
- Preceded by: Nathan Olmsted
- Succeeded by: Eli Robinson
- Constituency: Lafayette 1st

Personal details
- Born: January 11, 1818 Franklin, Kentucky, U.S.
- Died: June 12, 1900 (aged 82) Shullsburg, Wisconsin, U.S.
- Resting place: Saint Matthews New Catholic Cemetery, Shullsburg, Wisconsin
- Party: Democratic
- Spouse: Mary E. McGown (m. 1847–1900)
- Children: Laura (Hughes)^{(b. 1847; died 1917)}; Katherine "Kate" (Dunlop)^{(b. 1850; died 1929)}; Arethusa R. "Susan" (Leclerc)^{(b. 1852; died 1924)}; James Emmett Earnest^{(b. 1853; died 1902)}; Ida B. (Porter)^{(b. 1856; died 1892)}; Gratton William Earnest^{(b. 1857; died 1917)}; Walter Washington Earnest^{(b. 1859; died 1920)}; Charles D. Earnest^{(b. 1861)}

James Harrison Earnest (January 11, 1818 – June 12, 1900) was an American Democratic politician and Wisconsin pioneer. He served four years in the Wisconsin State Senate and six years in the Assembly, representing Lafayette County.

== Background ==
James Earnest was born in Franklin, Kentucky, in 1818. His parents died while he was still young, and, when he was about sixteen years old, he went to Springfield, Illinois, to look for work. In 1836, he moved north into the Wisconsin Territory and settled at the township of New Diggings. He found work in the lead mines, and, after 1844, opened a store in the town and operated his own mining company.

In 1850, he used his earnings to purchase an unimproved farmstead in the vicinity of Shullsburg, Wisconsin. He constructed a home and other buildings on the property.

In politics, he became an outspoken supporter of the Democratic Party, which was popular with the laborers in the lead mining region. Over the next several decades, he was elected to six terms in the Wisconsin State Assembly, and two 2-year terms in the Wisconsin State Senate. He was a constant defender of the economic interests of the lead mining region, until the industry began to decline in the aftermath of the American Civil War.

In his later years, he devoted his attention to his farmstead, where he raised thoroughbred livestock.

He died at his homestead near Shullsburg on June 12, 1900, after a long illness.

== Personal life and family ==
James Earnest married Mary E. McGown of Mercer County, Kentucky, in 1847. They had eight children together, all of whom were still living at the time of his death in 1900.

Wisconsin State Assembly
Preceded by Nathan Olmsted	Member of the Wisconsin State Assembly from the Lafayette 1st district January 5, 1852 – January 3, 1853	Succeeded by Eli Robinson
Preceded by Eli Robinson	Member of the Wisconsin State Assembly from the Lafayette 1st district January 2, 1854 – January 7, 1856	Succeeded by Matthew Murphy
Preceded by Hamilton H. Gray	Member of the Wisconsin State Assembly from the Lafayette 3rd district January 5, 1857 – January 3, 1859	Succeeded by David W. Kyle
Preceded by Danverse Neff (all of Lafayette County)	Member of the Wisconsin State Assembly from the Lafayette 2nd district January 1, 1877 – January 7, 1878	Succeeded by Bernard McGinty
Wisconsin Senate
Preceded by Samuel Cole	Member of the Wisconsin Senate from the 13th district January 5, 1863 – January 2, 1865	Succeeded by Samuel Cole
Preceded by Samuel Cole	Member of the Wisconsin Senate from the 13th district January 7, 1867 – January 4, 1869	Succeeded by Hamilton H. Gray
