= Eugene H. Merrill (academic) =

American Old Testament scholar

Eugene Merrill
- Born: September 12, 1934 (age 92); Anson, Maine, U.S.

Academic background
- Education: Bob Jones University (BA, MA, PhD); New York University (MA); Columbia University (MPhil, PhD)

Academic work
- Discipline: Theology; Biblical studies
- Sub-discipline: Old Testament studies
- Institutions: Bob Jones University; Berkshire Christian College; Dallas Theological Seminary; Southern Baptist Theological Seminary

Eugene Haines Merrill (born September 12, 1934) is an American Old Testament scholar who has worked as a distinguished professor of Old Testament studies at Dallas Theological Seminary and 2010 president of the Evangelical Theological Society.

== Early life, family, and education ==
Merrill was born in Anson, Maine. He attended Bob Jones University, where he earned his Bachelor of Arts (1957), Master of Arts in Bible (1960), and PhD in Old Testament interpretation (1963). After moving to New York for his wife to complete her doctorate, Merrill earned an M.A. in Jewish studies at New York University (1970), and his M.Phil. (1976) and Ph.D. (1985) in Middle East languages and culture at Columbia University. He also completed post-doctoral research (1989–1990) at Tyndale House in Cambridge.

== Career ==
Merrill taught at Bob Jones University from 1963 until 1966, then at Berkshire Christian College from 1968 until 1975. He joined the faculty of Dallas Theological Seminary in 1975, and retired in 2013 as Distinguished Professor of Old Testament Studies (Emeritus). He has also served on the faculty of the Southern Baptist Theological Seminary in Louisville, Kentucky, since 2005 as Distinguished Professor of Old Testament Interpretation. He is a member of the American Oriental Society, the Near East Archaeological Society, the Society of Biblical Literature, and he served as president of the Evangelical Theological Society, of which he has been a member since 1965.

== Personal life ==
Merrill married Janet (née Hippensteel) in December 1960.

== Selected publications ==
Merrill has published ten books, contributed to several other collaborative projects, served as a translator in three biblical text projects, and written nearly 200 scholarly articles, mostly for Bibliotheca Sacra. Significant titles include:

- Qumran and Predestination: A Theological Study of the Thanksgiving Hymns (1975)
- The Accession Year and Davidic Chronology (1986)
- Genesis Debate (1986)
- 1, 2 Chronicles: Bible Study Commentary (1988)
- Israel's Apostasy and Restoration (1988)
- Royal Priesthood: An Old Testament Messianic Motif (1991)
- An Historical Survey of the Old Testament (1991)
- A Biblical Theology of the Old Testament (1991)
- Haggai, Zechariah, Malachi: An Exegetical Commentary (1994)
- Deuteronomy (1994)
- The Old Testament Explorer: Discovering the Essence, Background, and Meaning of Every Book in the Old Testament (2001)
- Die Geschichte Israels: Ein Königreich Von Priestern (2001)
- The Bible Knowledge Key Word Study: Genesis--Deuteronomy (2003)
- Everlasting Dominion: A Theology of the Old Testament (2006)
- Kingdom of Priests: A History of Old Testament Israel (1987)
- The World and the Word (co-author) (2011)
- A Commentary on 1 & 2 Chronicles (2015)
