= Henry S. Magoon =

19th century U.S. congressman from Wisconsin

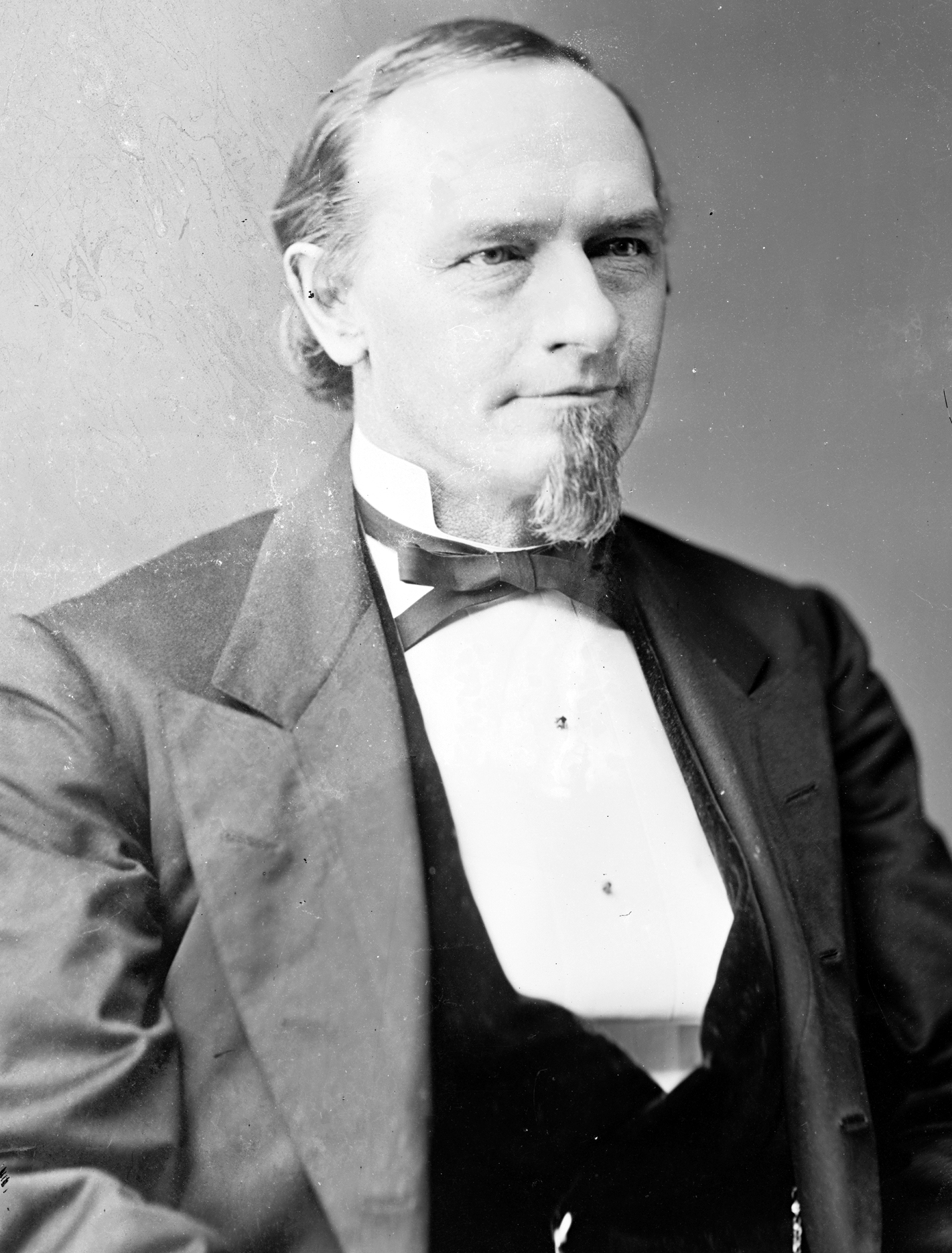

Member of the U.S. House of Representatives from Wisconsin's 3rd district
- In office March 4, 1875 – March 3, 1877
- Preceded by: J. Allen Barber
- Succeeded by: George Cochrane Hazelton

Member of the Wisconsin Senate
- In office January 1, 1872 – January 6, 1873
- Preceded by: William M. Colladay
- Succeeded by: Francis Campbell
- Constituency: 11th Senate district
- In office January 2, 1871 – January 1, 1872
- Preceded by: Hamilton H. Gray
- Succeeded by: Satterlee Clark
- Constituency: 13th Senate district

Personal details
- Born: Henry Sterling Magoon; January 31, 1832 Monticello, Wisconsin Territory, U.S.
- Died: March 3, 1889 (aged 57) Darlington, Wisconsin, U.S.
- Resting place: Union Grove Cemetery, Darlington, Wisconsin
- Party: Republican
- Spouse: Isabella S. Smith (m. 1871–1889)
- Children: Richard Henry Magoon^{(b. 1872; died 1939)}; Jay Howard Magoon^{(b. 1874; died 1960)}; Agnes M. (Alexander)^{(b. 1876; died 1956)}; Josephine Mary (Paul)^{(b. 1884; died 1959)}
- Profession: Lawyer

Henry Sterling Magoon (January 31, 1832 – March 3, 1889) was an American lawyer, Republican politician, and Wisconsin pioneer. He served one term in the U.S. House of Representatives, representing Wisconsin's 3rd congressional district for the 44th Congress (1875–1877). He was the first native-born Wisconsinite to represent the state in Congress. Before serving in Congress, he served two years in the Wisconsin Senate (1871 & 1872), and served as district attorney of Lafayette County, Wisconsin.

== Biography ==
Born in Monticello in the Wisconsin Territory, Magoon attended the Rock River Seminary, Mount Morris, Illinois, and was graduated from the Western Military College, Drennon, Kentucky, in 1853.

He studied law in the Montrose Law School, Frankfort, Kentucky, and then worked as professor of ancient languages at the University of Nashville. In 1857, he returned to Wisconsin where he was admitted to the bar and commenced a law practice at Darlington.

=== Early political career ===
A year later, he was elected district attorney of Lafayette County. He then served as member of the Wisconsin State Senate in 1871 and 1872.

=== Congress ===
Magoon was elected as a Republican to the Forty-fourth Congress (March 4, 1875 – March 3, 1877) as the representative of Wisconsin's 3rd congressional district. He was defeated seeking renomination at the Republican district convention in 1876.

=== Later career ===
He resumed the practice of law in Milwaukee, Wisconsin. Magoon was a regent of the University of Wisconsin–Madison for one term. Magoon was the first native of Wisconsin to serve in the Wisconsin Senate or in the United States House of Representatives.

=== Death and burial ===
He died while on a visit to his summer home in Darlington, Wisconsin, on March 3, 1889. He was interred in Union Grove Cemetery.

== Electoral history ==
=== Wisconsin Senate (1870) ===
Wisconsin Senate, 13th District Election, 1870
Party	Candidate	Votes	%	±%
General Election, November 8, 1870
Republican	Henry S. Magoon	2,009	52.21%	
Democratic	Charles Dunn	1,839	47.79%	
Plurality		170	4.42%	
Total votes		3,848	100.0%	
Republican gain from Democratic				

=== U.S. House (1874) ===
Wisconsin's 3rd Congressional District Election, 1874
Party	Candidate	Votes	%	±%
General Election, November 3, 1874
Republican	Henry S. Magoon	11,535	52.72%	+5.46pp
Reform	Charles F. Thompson	10,343	47.28%	
Plurality		1,192	5.45%	-10.91pp
Total votes		21,878	100.0%	-7.39%
Republican hold				

Wisconsin Senate
Preceded by Hamilton H. Gray	Member of the Wisconsin Senate from the 13th district January 2, 1871 – January 1, 1872	Succeeded by Satterlee Clark
Preceded by William M. Colladay	Member of the Wisconsin Senate from the 11th district January 1, 1872 – January 6, 1873	Succeeded by Francis Campbell
U.S. House of Representatives
Preceded by J. Allen Barber	Member of the U.S. House of Representatives from Wisconsin's 3rd congressional district March 4, 1875 - March 3, 1877	Succeeded by George Cochrane Hazelton
