= John Armstrong (Wisconsin pioneer) =

American politician (1814–1887)

Member of the Wisconsin State Assembly from the Lafayette 2nd district
- In office January 1, 1866 – January 7, 1867
- Preceded by: Sylvester W. Osborn
- Succeeded by: William Monroe

Personal details
- Born: 1814 Franklin County, Pennsylvania, U.S.
- Died: January 3, 1887 (aged 72–73) Argyle, Wisconsin, U.S.
- Resting place: Miller Cemetery, Wiota, Wisconsin
- Party: Natl. Union

John Armstrong (1814 – January 3, 1887) was an American farmer, politician, and Wisconsin pioneer. He served one term in the Wisconsin State Assembly, representing Lafayette County's 2nd Assembly district during the 19th Wisconsin Legislature (1866).

Wisconsin State Assembly
Preceded by Sylvester W. Osborn	Member of the Wisconsin State Assembly from the Lafayette 2nd district January 1, 1866 – January 7, 1867	Succeeded by William Monroe
