= Elijah Steele =

American politician (1817–1883)

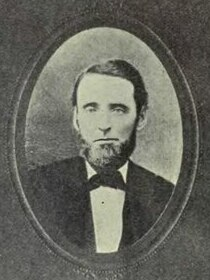

Judge of the California Superior Court for Siskiyou County
- In office November 1879 – June 27, 1883
- Succeeded by: E. Shearer

Member of the California State Assembly from the Siskiyou County district
- In office December 2, 1867 – December 6, 1869 Serving with John A. Fairchild
- Preceded by: Thomas H. Steele and J. K. Luttrell
- Succeeded by: William Shores and R. M. Martin

Member of the Wisconsin Senate from the 16th district
- In office January 7, 1850 – January 1851
- Preceded by: Christopher Latham Sholes
- Succeeded by: Orson S. Head

Personal details
- Born: November 13, 1817 Watervliet, New York, U.S.
- Died: June 27, 1883 (aged 65) Yreka, California, U.S.
- Resting place: Evergreen Cemetery, Yreka, California
- Party: Democratic
- Spouses: Lucia Hart (m. 1843; died 1853); Louisa B. Hamblin (m. 1858; died 1866); Louisa Lanze (m. 1875; died 1883)
- Relatives: William Steele (brother)

Elijah Steele (November 13, 1817 – June 27, 1883) was an American attorney, jurist, Indian agent, and pioneer of Wisconsin and Northern California. He served as a delegate to Wisconsin's first constitutional convention, and was a member of the Wisconsin State Senate and the California State Assembly. For the last four years of his life, he was a California superior court judge.

== Early life ==
Born near Albany, New York, Steele was raised in Oswego.

== Career ==
After reading law in the office of Grant and Allen, he was admitted to the New York bar in 1840. He moved west in 1841, practicing law in both Illinois and Wisconsin. Steele was a member of the first Wisconsin constitutional convention of 1846, and briefly served in the Wisconsin State Senate.

In 1850, Steele traveled to California, prospecting at Shasta, Scott River, Greenhorn and Yreka, among other claims. Before returning to the practice of law on a permanent basis during the mid-1850s, he engaged in a variety of occupations, including express company operator and driver, butcher and rancher. As a Republican Party leader, Steele campaigned actively for Abraham Lincoln in 1860 and was himself elected to the California State Assembly in 1867, where he served as chairman of the judiciary committee. Steele was elected a Superior Court judge for Siskiyou County in 1879 and held the office until his death. In 1865, he was the founder of the Siskiyou County Agricultural Society and served as its first president. During the early 1860s Steele was Agent of Indian Affairs for the Northern District of California, in which office he secured a treaty (known as the Valentine's Day Treaty) with the Modoc Indians which may well have averted the later Modoc War, had the treaty been ratified. During the war with the Modocs (1872–1873), Steele worked tirelessly to secure both peace and justice for the tribe, drawing accusations and recriminations, particularly from Oregon settlers who sought the executions of Modoc raiders.

== Personal life ==
Steele was married three times, to Lucia Hart (1843–1853), to Louisa B. Hamblin (1858–1866) and to Louisa Lanze (1875–1883). Steele's first name is frequently erroneously reported as Elisha. This is due to an original misreading or misrecording of an early California voter list. This error first received wide circulation in Keith A. Murray's groundbreaking, The Modocs and Their War in 1959 and it has often been repeated. Steele's grave marker, in Yreka, California's Evergreen Cemetery, clarifies this discrepancy, as does his obituary in the Yreka Journal of June 30, 1883.
