= Henning Township, Otter Tail County, Minnesota =

Henning Township, Minnesota
- Township
- Location of Henning Township, within Otter Tail County, Minnesota

- Location within the state of Minnesota Henning Township, Minnesota (the United States)
- Coordinates: 46°19′6″N 95°28′48″W
- Country: United States
- State: Minnesota
- County: Otter Tail

Area
  - Total: 32.9 sq mi (85.1 km^{2})
  - Land: 32.6 sq mi (84.4 km^{2})
  - Water: 0.27 sq mi (0.7 km^{2})
- Elevation: 1,421 ft (433 m)

Population (2020)
  - Total: 389
  - Density: 11.9/sq mi (4.61/km^{2})
- Time zone: UTC-6 (Central (CST))
  - Summer (DST): UTC-5 (CDT)
- ZIP code: 56551
- Area code: 218
- FIPS code: 27-28538
- GNIS feature ID: 0664454

Henning Township is a township in Otter Tail County, Minnesota, United States. The population was 389 at the 2020 census.

== History ==
Henning Township was originally called East Battle Lake Township, and under the latter name was organized in 1878. The name was changed in 1884, in honor of John O. Henning, a pharmacist and former Wisconsin state legislator.

== Geography ==
According to the United States Census Bureau, the township has a total area of 32.9 square miles (85 km^{2}), of which 32.6 square miles (84 km^{2}) is land and 0.3 square miles (0.78 km^{2}) (0.85%) is water.

== Demographics ==
As of the census of 2000, there were 426 people, 140 households, and 111 families living in the township. The population density was 13.1 inhabitants per square mile (5.1/km^{2}). There were 175 housing units at an average density of 5.4/sq. mi (2.1/km^{2}). The racial makeup of the township was 99.30% White, 0.47% Asian, 0.23% from other races. Hispanic or Latino of any race was 0.47% of the population.

There were 140 households, out of which 31.4% had children under the age of 18 living with them, 74.3% were married couples living together, 1.4% had a female householder with no husband present, and 20.7% were non-families. 18.6% of all households were made up of individuals, and 7.9% had someone living alone who was 65 years of age or older. The average household size was 2.66 and the average family size was 2.99.

In the township the population was spread out, with 21.8% under the age of 18, 6.8% from 18 to 24, 19.5% from 25 to 44, 25.8% from 45 to 64, and 26.1% who were 65 years of age or older. The median age was 46 years. For every 100 females, there were 99.1 males. For every 100 females age 18 and over, there were 100.6 males.

The median income for a household in the township was $31,875, and the median income for a family was $37,578. Males had a median income of $25,278 versus $17,500 for females. The per capita income for the township was $13,215. About 6.0% of families and 9.3% of the population were below the poverty line, including 13.4% of those under age 18 and 14.6% of those age 65 or over.
