= William H. Johnson (Wisconsin politician) =

American politician

William H. Johnson (c. 1806 - ?) was an American politician and farmer from Fort Atkinson, Wisconsin who spent a single one-year term as a Democratic member of the Wisconsin State Assembly from Jefferson County during the 1849 session (the 2nd Wisconsin Legislature), succeeding fellow Democrat Ninian E. Whiteside.

== Public service ==
Johnson had become postmaster of Fort Atkinson in Wisconsin Territory in October 1846.

At the time he took office in the Assembly in January 1849, he was reported to be 42 years old, a farmer from Maine, and to have been in Wisconsin five years. In 1850 he was succeeded by John K. Williams, another Democrat.

== Private life ==
On July 6, 1849, he is recorded as Past Grand Master of Fort Atkinson Lodge, No. 24, of the Independent Order of Odd Fellows.
