= John O. Henning =

American pioneer (1819–1897)

Member of the Wisconsin State Assembly from the La Pointe–St. Croix district
- In office January 6, 1851 – January 5, 1852
- Preceded by: John S. Watrous
- Succeeded by: Otis W. Hoyt

Personal details
- Born: April 9, 1819 Bellefonte, Pennsylvania, U.S.
- Died: April 15, 1897 (aged 78) Hudson, Wisconsin, U.S.
- Party: Democratic
- Spouse: Fidelia Bennet (m. 1840; died 1886)
- Profession: Pharmacist, politician

John Owen Henning (April 9, 1819 – April 15, 1897) was an American pharmacist, land speculator, politician, and Wisconsin pioneer. He was one of the earliest American settlers at Hudson, Wisconsin, and served one term in the Wisconsin State Assembly, representing the La Pointe–St. Croix district during the 4th Wisconsin Legislature (1851). He also served eight years as register of the U.S. Land Office in Hudson, and was the namesake of Henning, Minnesota.

== Biography ==
John O. Henning was born in 1819 in Bellefonte, Centre County, Pennsylvania. As a child, he moved with his family to Ithaca, New York, in 1825, where he was educated at a local academy.

Growing up in the era of Andrew Jackson, Henning was inspired to join the Democratic Party. In order to participate in politics, he learned the printer's trade, and worked in newspapers. As a young man, he toured the new territories of the Midwest in 1838, visiting St. Louis, Missouri, Springfield, Illinois, and Burlington, Iowa. In the mid-1840s, prominent Wisconsin Territory pioneer Mason C. Darling summoned Henning to the village of Fond du Lac, to establish a Democratic newspaper there. Henning moved to Fond du Lac with business partner Eli Hooker, and together they started the Fond du Lac Journal in October 1846. The newspaper was not very profitable, however, and Henning and Hooker sold their ownership within a year. Decades later, Henning commented that during the year he ran the Fond du Lac newspaper, he was so impoverished that his weight declined from 165 pounds to 128.

A short time later, Henning moved west to the area that is now Hudson, Wisconsin, and speculated in land near the confluence of the St. Croix and Mississippi rivers; he became one of the first American settlers there, and Hudson ultimately remained his home for the rest of his life. Shortly after settling in the west, in 1850 Henning was appointed county surveyor for St. Croix County. Later that year, he was nominated by the Democratic Party to serve in the Wisconsin State Assembly from the vast La Pointe–St. Croix district. Henning prevailed in the 1850 general election, and went on to serve in the 4th Wisconsin Legislature. During his term in the Assembly, Henning secured passage of a bill to rename the town where he resided from "Buena Vista" to "Willow River".

In 1853, Henning was appointed register of the U.S. Land Office in Willow River (Hudson), serving the Chippewa Land District which covered the vast northwest quadrant of the state; he was reappointed to another four-year term in 1857. Henning ultimately served eight years in that office as the population of western Wisconsin rose exponentially.

In the 1860s, Henning constructed a large commercial block in Hudson, from which he operated a drug store. During these years, Henning also became the namesake of a long-running steamboat ferry, the John O. Henning, owned and operated by Patrick McGuire and later by his son, Frank. In 1884, the town of East Battle Lake, Minnesota, was renamed Henning Township, in honor of John Henning; a railroad village in the town limits was also named Henning.

== Personal life and family ==
John O. Henning was eldest of six known children born to George Henning and his wife Isabella Campbell (née Boggs). George Henning was a boot and shoemaker, he also moved to Wisconsin and settled permanently at Fond du Lac around the time of John Henning's arrival there in the mid-1840s. John had at least one younger brother, Benjamin S. Henning, who served as a Union Army officer in the American Civil War, then became a notable civil engineer.

His great-grandfather was believed to be the first American settler in what is now Centre County, Pennsylvania.

John Henning married Fidelia Bennet on January 29, 1840. They were married for 46 years before his wife's death in 1886; they had no known children. John Henning died at his home in Hudson on April 15, 1897.

Wisconsin State Assembly
Preceded by John S. Watrous	Member of the Wisconsin State Assembly from the La Pointe–St. Croix district January 6, 1851 – January 5, 1852	Succeeded by Otis W. Hoyt
