= Peter D. Gifford =

19th century American politician

Member of the Wisconsin State Assembly from the Waukesha 3rd district
- In office January 1, 1866 – January 7, 1867
- Preceded by: John B. Monteith
- Succeeded by: James Murray
- In office January 6, 1862 – January 5, 1863
- Preceded by: Henry A. Youmans
- Succeeded by: David G. Snover

Member of the Wisconsin State Assembly from the Waukesha 2nd district
- In office January 6, 1851 – January 5, 1852
- Preceded by: Henry Shears
- Succeeded by: Denison Worthington

Coroner of Waukesha County, Wisconsin
- In office January 1, 1865 – January 1, 1867
- Preceded by: William H. Burgess
- Succeeded by: William M. Saunders

Personal details
- Born: August 31, 1812 Northampton, Fulton County, New York, U.S.
- Died: March 17, 1888 (aged 75) Genesee, Wisconsin, U.S.
- Resting place: North Prairie Cemetery, North Prairie, Wisconsin
- Party: Democratic
- Spouse: Maria De Golier (m. 1831–1888)
- Children: Lucinda Ann (Alvord)^{(b. 1833; died 1923)}; Julia E. (Lampman) (Walforn)^{(b. 1838; died 1929)}; Lewis A. Gifford^{(b. 1840; died 1887)}; Maranda (Heese)^{(b. 1842; died after 1890)}; Marion (Wright)^{(b. 1845; died 1910)}; Maria Ella (Stocker)^{(b. 1848; died 1933)}; Margaret Lorenda (Holsapple) (Baum) (Phillips) (Erredge)^{(b. 1853; died 1941)}
- Profession: Lawyer, politician

Peter D. Gifford (August 31, 1812 – March 17, 1888) was an American lawyer, merchant, Democratic politician, and Wisconsin pioneer. He served three terms in the Wisconsin State Assembly, representing Waukesha County during the 1851, 1862, and 1866 terms. He was also a delegate to the convention which drafted the Constitution of Wisconsin in the Winter of 1847–1848. His name was sometimes abbreviated as P. D. Gifford.

== Biography ==
Peter Gifford was born August 31, 1812, in Northampton, Fulton County, New York. He was raised and educated in New York, and became a lawyer. He came to the Wisconsin Territory in 1844, settling in what is now Waukesha County, Wisconsin. He originally resided in the town of Ottawa and became the first postmaster there. In 1846, he was a delegate to a convention for the creation of what is now Waukesha County, from what had been the western half of Milwaukee County.

After the creation of Waukesha County and the failure of the first attempt at a state constitution for Wisconsin, Gifford was nominated on the Democratic Party slate to serve as a delegate to Wisconsin's 2nd constitutional convention. He was elected and served at the convention that winter, which ultimately produced the Constitution of Wisconsin. After Wisconsin statehood, Gifford served on the jury for the first jury trial in Waukesha County. During these early years, he also established the first hotel in what is now the village of North Prairie, Wisconsin.

In 1850, Gifford was elected to his first term on the Waukesha County Board of Supervisors. That fall, he was elected to represent Waukesha County's 2nd Assembly district in the 4th Wisconsin Legislature; his district at the time comprised the towns of Summit, Oconomowoc, Merton, and Ottawa, in roughly the northwest quadrant of the county. After his first term in the Assembly, he was elected to four more terms on the county board, in 1852, 1854, 1859, and 1860. He also ran for county board in 1853, but lost a close election to Whig Talbott Dousman. Through the 1850s and 1860s, he was a nearly-constant attendee at state, county, and district-level Democratic Party conventions, and was identified as the leading Democrat in the town of Genesee, Wisconsin, during that period.

He sought the Democratic Party nomination for sheriff in Waukesha County in 1860, but lost out to Benjamin Hunkins at the county convention. After the outbreak of the American Civil War, Gifford assisted in raising a company of volunteers for the Union Army, but did not enroll himself.

He returned to the Wisconsin State Assembly in 1862, then representing the Waukesha County's 3rd Assembly district, which at the time comprised all of the southwest quadrant of the county. In 1864, he was elected coroner of Waukesha County, serving a two-year term. He was elected to his third and last term in the Assembly in 1865, serving in the 1866 term and representing the same district as he had in 1862.

In 1866, Gifford was one of the founders of the North Prairie Petroleum Company, which raised $50,000 (roughly $1 million adjusted for inflation to 2025) to attempt to drill for oil in the town of Genesee; the enterprise was a complete failure.

Gifford's health began to decline in the 1870s, and he was confined for several years to a hospital for the insane in Madison, Wisconsin. Gifford eventually returned to the care of his family, in Genesee, and died at his home there on March 17, 1888.

== Personal life and family ==
Peter Gifford was the fourth of sixteen children born to Ananias Gifford and his wife Sally (née Proper). Peter's grandfather, Joseph Gifford, served as an ensign in the New York militia during the American Revolutionary War.

Gifford married Maria (or Marriah) DeGolier in New York on January 9, 1831. They had seven children and were married for 57 years before Peter's death in 1888. Both Gifford and his wife outlived their son, Lewis, but were survived by six daughters.

Wisconsin State Assembly
Preceded by Henry Shears	Member of the Wisconsin State Assembly from the Waukesha 2nd district January 6, 1851 – January 5, 1852	Succeeded by Denison Worthington
Preceded by Henry A. Youmans	Member of the Wisconsin State Assembly from the Waukesha 3rd district January 6, 1862 – January 5, 1863	Succeeded by David G. Snover
Preceded by John B. Monteith	Member of the Wisconsin State Assembly from the Waukesha 3rd district January 1, 1866 – January 7, 1867	Succeeded by James Murray
Political offices
Preceded by William H. Burgess	Coroner of Waukesha County, Wisconsin; January 1, 1865 – January 1, 1867	Succeeded by William M. Saunders
