= Patrick Roger Vail =

American politician (1859–1913)

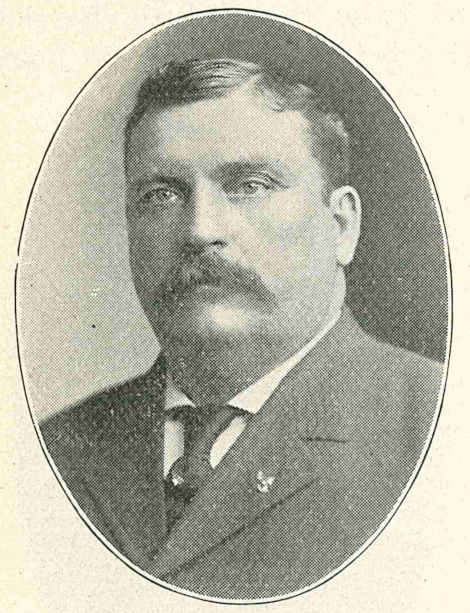
Vail in 1909

Patrick Roger Vail (March 30, 1859 – January 30, 1913) was an American politician and businessman.

Vail was born in Shullsburg, Lafayette County, Wisconsin. He moved to Ontonagon, Michigan to live with an uncle when his parents died. Vail moved to Ely, Minnesota in 1887 and was a merchant. He served as Mayor of Ely and was a Republican. Vail served in the Minnesota House of Representatives in 1897 and 1898 and in the Minnesota Senate from 1907 to 1910. He died at his home in Virginia, Minnesota.
