= Monticello, Lafayette County, Wisconsin =

Monticello, Wisconsin
- Town
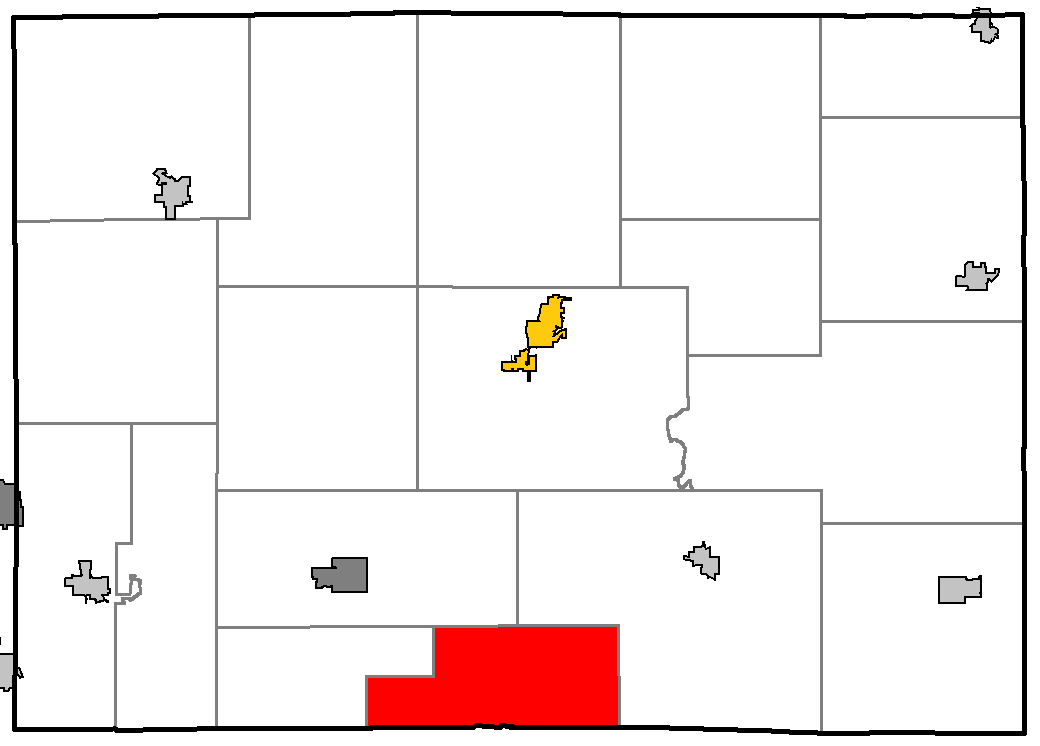
- Location of Monticello, within Lafayette County, Wisconsin

- Location of Lafayette County, Wisconsin
- Coordinates: 42°31′58″N 90°7′40″W
- Country: United States
- State: Wisconsin
- County: Lafayette

Area
  - Total: 19.64 sq mi (50.86 km^{2})
  - Land: 19.64 sq mi (50.86 km^{2})
  - Water: 0 sq mi (0.0 km^{2})
- Elevation: 1,024 ft (312 m)

Population (2020)
  - Total: 138
  - Density: 7.03/sq mi (2.71/km^{2})
- Time zone: UTC-6 (Central (CST))
  - Summer (DST): UTC-5 (CDT)
- ZIP Codes: 53586 (Shullsburg); 53541 (Gratiot)
- Area code: 608
- FIPS code: 55-54025
- GNIS feature ID: 1583747

Monticello is a town in Lafayette County, Wisconsin, United States. The population was 138 at the 2020 census.

== Geography ==
Monticello is in southern Lafayette County, bordered to the south by Jo Daviess County, Illinois. According to the United States Census Bureau, the town has a total area of 19.7 square miles (50.9 km^{2}), all land. The Apple River runs through the center of the county, flowing south into Illinois and joining the Mississippi River at Blackhawk.

== Demographics ==
Historical population
Census	Pop.	Note	%±
2000	148		—
2010	133		−10.1%
2020	138		3.8%

As of the census of 2000, there were 148 people, 51 households, and 39 families residing in the town. The population density was 7.5 people per square mile (2.9/km^{2}). There were 52 housing units at an average density of 2.6 per square mile (1.0/km^{2}). The racial makeup of the town was 95.27% White and 4.73% African American.

There were 51 households, out of which 35.3% had children under the age of 18 living with them, 64.7% were married couples living together, and 23.5% were non-families. 17.6% of all households were made up of individuals, and 9.8% had someone living alone who was 65 years of age or older. The average household size was 2.90 and the average family size was 3.31.

In the town, the population was spread out, with 27.0% under the age of 18, 12.8% from 18 to 24, 24.3% from 25 to 44, 23.0% from 45 to 64, and 12.8% who were 65 years of age or older. The median age was 37 years. For every 100 females, there were 100.0 males. For every 100 females age 18 and over, there were 107.7 males.

The median income for a household in the town was $35,000, and the median income for a family was $37,188. Males had a median income of $20,125 versus $16,250 for females. The per capita income for the town was $13,120. There were 14.0% of families and 22.0% of the population living below the poverty line, including 28.9% of under eighteens and 12.5% of those over 64.

== Notable people ==
- Henry S. Magoon, Wisconsin politician
