= C. D. Hulburt House =

Historic house in Wisconsin, United States

- U.S. National Register of Historic Places
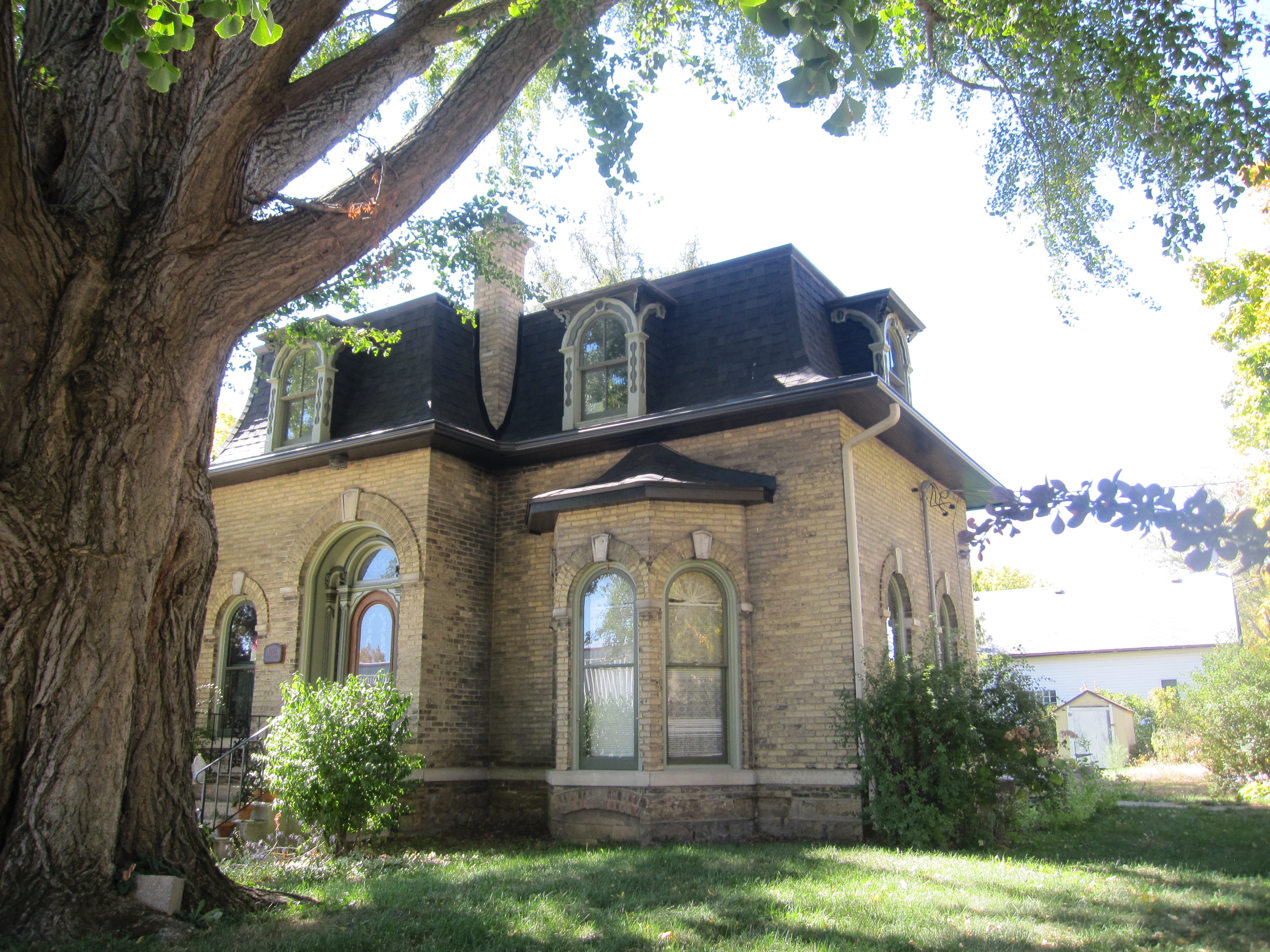
- C.D. Hulburt House
- Location: 1205 13th Ave., Monroe, Wisconsin
- Coordinates: 42°36′00″N 89°38′37″W
- Area: less than one acre
- Built: 1878
- Architectural style: Second Empire/French
- NRHP reference No.: 79000082
- Added to NRHP: May 8, 1979

The C. D. Hulburt House is a historic house at 1205 13th Avenue in Monroe, Wisconsin.

== History ==
The house was built in 1878 for Chauncey D. Hulburt, a prominent lumberman who moved to Green County from Onondaga County, New York in 1847. His father, Julius Hulburt, was a member of the Wisconsin State Assembly. The one-and-a-half story house is the only Second Empire house standing in Green County. Hulburt traveled around the world by ship in 1865, and his travels may have inspired his choice of a locally uncommon style. The house's design includes an arched entrance and front window, a three-sided bay window on the front facade, and a mansard roof with ornate wooden dormers. The interior of the house includes carved walnut and maple fixtures and hardwood flooring, befitting Hulburt's occupation.

The house was listed on the National Register of Historic Places in 1979 and on the State Register of Historic Places in 1989.
