= Anson, Maine =

Town in Maine, United States

- Town
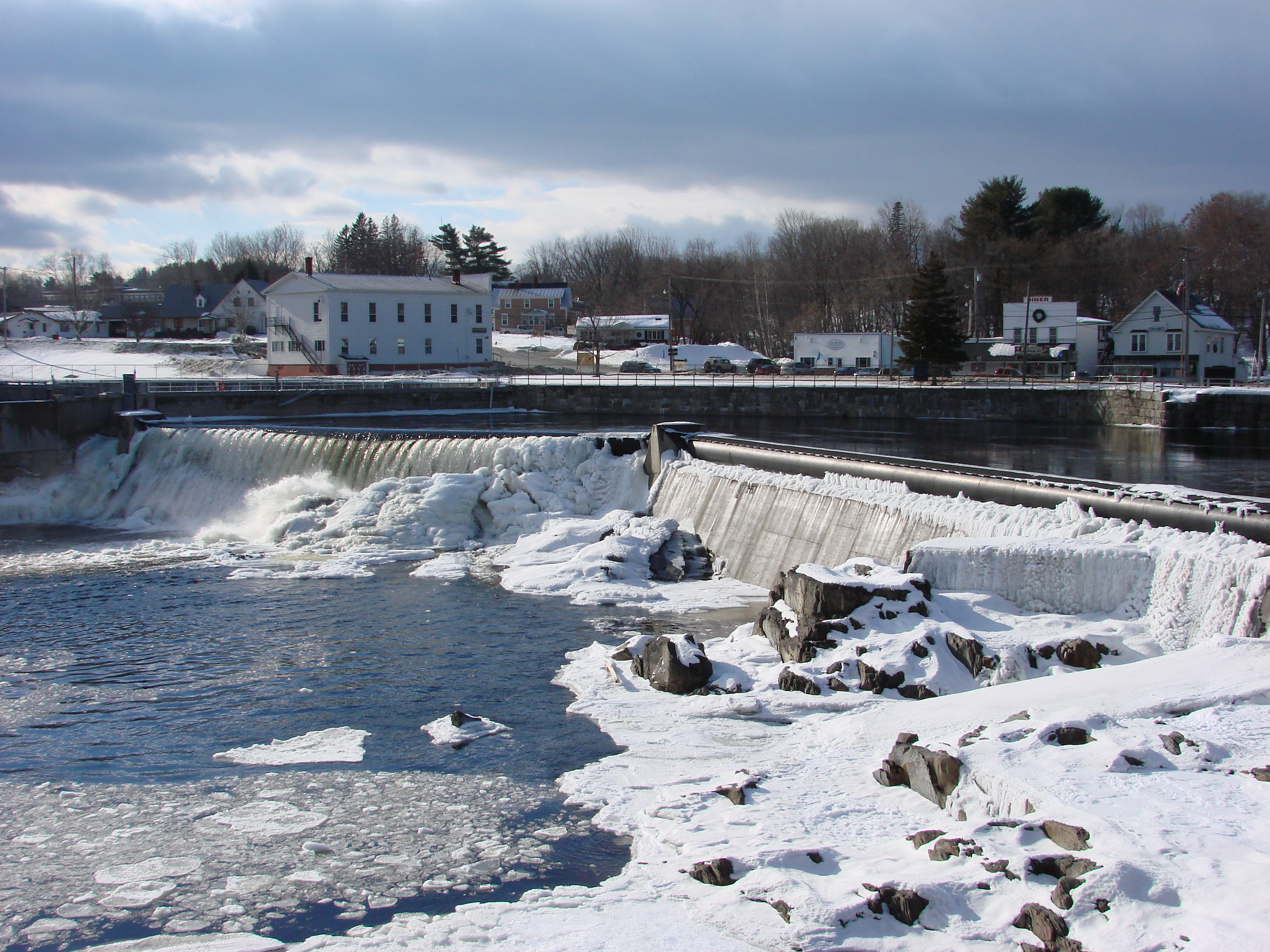
- Looking across the falls at downtown Anson, showing the town hall at left, January 2010

- Location within Maine Location within the United States
- Coordinates: 44°51′17″N 69°56′50″W
- Country: United States
- State: Maine
- County: Somerset

Area
  - Total: 48.29 sq mi (125.07 km^{2})
  - Land: 47.49 sq mi (123.00 km^{2})
  - Water: 0.80 sq mi (2.07 km^{2})
- Elevation: 440 ft (130 m)

Population (2020)
  - Total: 2,291
  - Density: 48/sq mi (18.6/km^{2})
- Time zone: UTC-5 (Eastern (EST))
  - Summer (DST): UTC-4 (EDT)
- ZIP Codes: 04911 (Anson); 04958 (North Anson)
- Area code: 207
- GNIS feature ID: 582326
- Website: www.townofansonme.net

Anson is a town in Somerset County, Maine, United States. The population was 2,291 at the time of the 2020 census. It includes the villages of Anson and North Anson.

== History ==
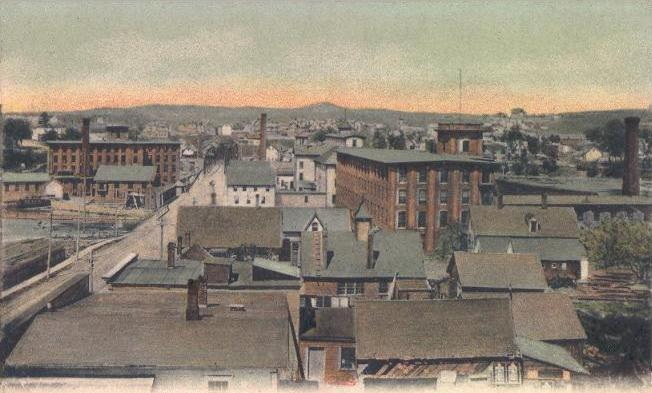
Madison mills and a bird's-eye view of Anson c. 1906

The land upon which Anson was founded was historically home to the Norridgewock Abenaki. It was first settled in 1772 as Plantation Number One in what would become Somerset County on March 1, 1809. General Benedict Arnold and his troops passed through Anson village in 1775 on their way up the Kennebec River to the ill-fated Battle of Quebec. The town was incorporated on March 1, 1798, as Anson, named after Lord George Anson. On March 20, 1845, North Anson was set off as a separate town, although on March 13, 1855, it reunited with Anson.

With much rich alluvial soil, Anson became an agricultural town. Water power sites around the Carrabassett River helped North Anson develop into a small mill town. In 1859, it had two tanneries. It had two sawmills and three boot and shoe factories in 1886, when the town produced boots, shoes, leather, bricks, lumber, flour and wool rolls. By 1876, North Anson had become the northern terminus of the Somerset Railroad, which began at Oakland in 1872. As Madison grew into an industrial center with large paper mills, Anson became a residential district for its mill workers.

As of June 14, 2007, the abandoned Pan Am Railways spur was reopened, and the first train ran the length of the line for the first time in twenty years. However, in 2013, the line was abandoned by Pan Am Railways. On November 30, 2021, it was announced that the State of Maine had acquired the former rail line for conversion into a multi-use rail trail, as part of a larger project to create a trail from Oakland to Embden.

== Geography ==
According to the United States Census Bureau, the town has a total area of 48.29 square miles (125.07 km^{2}), of which 47.49 square miles (123.00 km^{2}) is land and 0.80 square miles (2.07 km^{2}) is water. Anson is drained by Mill Stream, Gilbert Brook, Lemon Stream, the Carrabassett River and the Kennebec River.

The town is crossed by U. S. 201A and state routes 8, 16, 43, 148 and 234. It borders the towns of Starks to the south, Industry and New Vineyard to the west, New Portland and Embden to the north, and (across the Kennebec River) Madison to the east.

=== Climate ===
This climatic region is typified by large seasonal temperature differences, with warm to hot (and often humid) summers and cold (sometimes severely cold) winters. According to the Köppen Climate Classification system, Anson has a humid continental climate, abbreviated "Dfb" on climate maps. It has no weather reporting station.

== Demographics ==
Historical population
Census	Pop.	Note	%±
1800	373		—
1810	633		69.7%
1820	948		49.8%
1830	1,532		61.6%
1840	1,941		26.7%
1850	848		−56.3%
1860	2,000		135.8%
1870	1,745		−12.7%
1880	1,555		−10.9%
1890	1,444		−7.1%
1900	1,830		26.7%
1910	2,209		20.7%
1920	2,593		17.4%
1930	2,238		−13.7%
1940	2,130		−4.8%
1950	2,199		3.2%
1960	2,252		2.4%
1970	2,168		−3.7%
1980	2,226		2.7%
1990	2,382		7.0%
2000	2,583		8.4%
2010	2,511		−2.8%
2020	2,291		−8.8%
U.S. Decennial Census

=== 2010 census ===
As of the census of 2010, there were 2,511 people, 1,069 households, and 684 families living in the town. The population density was 52.9 inhabitants per square mile (20.4/km^{2}). There were 1,300 housing units at an average density of 27.4 per square mile (10.6/km^{2}). The racial makeup of the town was 97.2% White, 0.2% African American, 0.7% Native American, 0.3% Asian, 0.1% from other races, and 1.4% from two or more races. Hispanic or Latino of any race were 1.0% of the population.

There were 1,069 households, of which 27.5% had children under the age of 18 living with them, 46.9% were married couples living together, 10.8% had a female householder with no husband present, 6.4% had a male householder with no wife present, and 36.0% were non-families. 27.4% of all households were made up of individuals, and 12% had someone living alone who was 65 years of age or older. The average household size was 2.34 and the average family size was 2.79.

The median age in the town was 44.3 years. 20.2% of residents were under the age of 18; 7.1% were between the ages of 18 and 24; 23.9% were from 25 to 44; 31.6% were from 45 to 64; and 17.1% were 65 years of age or older. The gender makeup of the town was 50.2% male and 49.8% female.

=== 2000 census ===
As of the census of 2000, there were 2,583 people, 1,031 households, and 700 families living in the town. The population density was 54.4 inhabitants per square mile (21.0/km^{2}). There were 1,193 housing units at an average density of 25.1 per square mile (9.7/km^{2}). The racial makeup of the town was 98.34% White, 0.08% Black or African American, 0.50% Native American, 0.04% Asian, and 1.05% from two or more races. Hispanic or Latino of any race were 0.31% of the population.

There were 1,031 households, out of which 33.0% had children under the age of 18 living with them, 54.2% were married couples living together, 9.4% had a female householder with no husband present, and 32.1% were non-families. 25.8% of all households were made up of individuals, and 12.5% had someone living alone who was 65 years of age or older. The average household size was 2.50 and the average family size was 2.95.

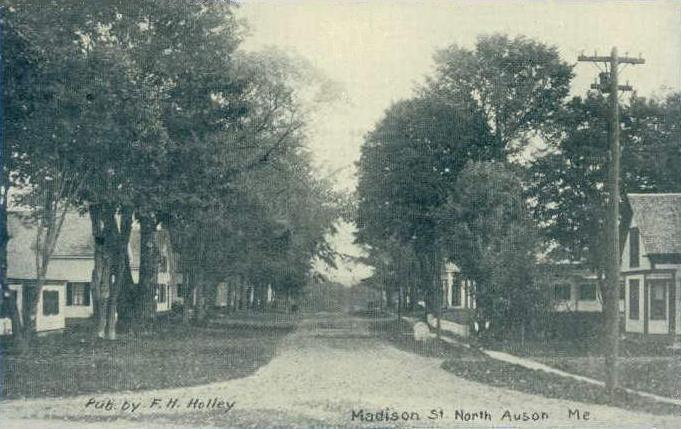
Madison Street in 1909

In the town, the population was spread out, with 25.3% under the age of 18, 7.3% from 18 to 24, 29.3% from 25 to 44, 23.3% from 45 to 64, and 14.9% who were 65 years of age or older. The median age was 38 years. For every 100 females, there were 100.2 males. For every 100 females age 18 and over, there were 95.5 males.

The median income for a household in the town was $26,088, and the median income for a family was $30,888. Males had a median income of $24,335 versus $18,194 for females. The per capita income for the town was $12,691. About 12.1% of families and 20.2% of the population were below the poverty line, including 22.5% of those under age 18 and 16.8% of those age 65 or over.

== Notable people ==
- Frank H. Holley, Maine state legislator
- Eugene H. Merrill, Old Testament scholar
- Lloyd T. Pullen, Wisconsin state legislator
- Larry Dunphy, American politician

== See also ==
- List of towns in Maine
