= Warren, Wisconsin =

Warren is the name of some places in the U.S. state of Wisconsin:

- Warren, St. Croix County, Wisconsin
- Warren, Waushara County, Wisconsin
- Merton, Wisconsin, a town in Waukesha County was previously known as Warren
