= John D. Seaver =

19th century American politician (1795–1886)

Member of the Wisconsin State Assembly from the Rock 3rd district
- In office January 6, 1851 – January 5, 1852
- Preceded by: Leander Hoskins
- Succeeded by: George R. Ramsey

Personal details
- Born: June 7, 1795 Augusta, New York, U.S.
- Died: February 2, 1886 (aged 90) Cooksville, Wisconsin, U.S.
- Resting place: Cooksville Cemetery, Cooksville, Wisconsin
- Party: Republican; Whig (before 1854)
- Spouse: Harriet Love (died 1872)
- Children: Calvin W. Seaver^{(b. 1818; died 1884)}; William Franklin Seaver^{(b. 1825; died 1886)}; Harriet (Potter-Dodge)^{(b. 1829; died 1911)}; Horatio N. Seaver^{(b. 1832; died 1884)}; Edwin R. Seaver^{(b. 1836; died 1846)}
- Parents: Robert Whitmore Seaver (father); Anna (Edson) Seaver (mother)
- Occupation: Farmer, politician

Military service
- Allegiance: United States
- Branch/service: New York Militia
- Unit: Martin B. Tubb's Company
- Battles/wars: War of 1812

John Devine Seaver (June 7, 1795 – February 2, 1886) was an American farmer, politician, and Wisconsin pioneer. He served one term in the Wisconsin State Assembly, representing northwestern Rock County as a Whig during the 1851 term.

== Biography ==
John D. Seaver was born on June 7, 1795, in Augusta, New York. He most likely moved to Charlotte, New York, when his parents became pioneer settlers there in 1809. During the War of 1812, he enlisted in the New York militia and served in the militia company of Captain Martin B. Tubb.

He married Harriet Love and they moved to Rock County, Wisconsin, where he established a farm in the town of Porter.

Seaver was involved in Whig and Republican politics. He attended the Whig Party convention in Rock County's 3rd Assembly district on Saturday, October 27, 1849, to select their candidate for Wisconsin State Assembly in the 1849 election. At the time, Rock County's 3rd district comprised the northwest corner of the county, including the towns of Magnolia, Union, Porter, and Fulton. At the informal convention vote, Seaver received 4 votes, losing to Leander Hoskins with 5 votes. In the formal vote, Seaver lost to Hoskins 7–5. Hoskins went on to win the election and represented Rock County's 3rd Assembly district in the 1850 term.

In 1850, John was he Whig Party nominee and was elected to the Wisconsin State Assembly in the Rock County 3rd district. He served in the 4th Wisconsin Legislature from January 6, 1851, to January 5, 1852. Seaver was a delegate from Porter to the 1861 Republican Convention for Rock County, Wisconsin.

Seaver died on February 2, 1886, at the age of 90.

== Personal life and family ==
John Devine Seaver was the second of nine children born to Robert Whitmore Seaver and his wife Anna (née Edson). Robert W. Seaver enlisted in the Continental Army at age 14 (about 1777) and served in the American Revolutionary War until the surrender of Lord Cornwallis in 1781, attaining the rank of sergeant. Later in life, Robert was the founder of Charlotte, New York, in 1809. The Seavers are descended from Robert Seaver, who emigrated to the Massachusetts Bay Colony from England in 1634.
