= James W. Freeman =

American politician

James W. Freeman (June 17, 1842 – May 31, 1895) was an American businessman and politician.

Born in St. Louis, Missouri, Freeman moved with his family to the town of Avon, Rock County, Wisconsin Territory in 1844. In 1855, Freeman and his family settled in Lafayette County, Wisconsin. Freeman was a grain and stock dealer. He was also involved in the mining industry. Freeman served as town chairman and mayor of Shullsburg, Wisconsin. Freeman served in the Wisconsin State Assembly in 1887, 1889, and 1895 and was a Republican. Freeman died in a hospital in Milwaukee, Wisconsin while still in office from complications in the removal of a mastoid abscess.
