= Danverse Neff =

American politician

Danverse Neff (21 May 1834, in New Lisbon, New York – 6 September 1898) was a member of the Wisconsin State Assembly.

== Political career ==
Neff was a member of the Assembly during the 1876 session. Additionally, he chaired the board of Willow Springs, Wisconsin and was a postmaster and a justice of the peace. He was a Republican.
