= William F. Tompkins (Wisconsin politician) =

19th century American politician

Member of the Wisconsin State Assembly from the Rock 1st district
- In office January 7, 1850 – January 5, 1852
- Preceded by: Anson W. Pope
- Succeeded by: William A. Lawrence

Probate Judge of Rock County
- In office January 1, 1846 – January 1, 1847
- Preceded by: A. C. Bailey
- Succeeded by: C. S. Jordan

Personal details
- Born: April 4, 1812 Scipio, New York, U.S.
- Died: August 17, 1871 (aged 59) Abilene, Kansas, U.S.
- Resting place: Abilene Cemetery, Abilene
- Party: Whig; Democratic (after 1854)
- Spouse: Caroline Leach (m. 1834–1871)
- Children: Horace I. Tompkins^{(b. 1837; died 1865)}; Celeste (Jackson)^{(b. 1839; died 1898)}; Carrie Tompkins^{(b. 1851; died 1853)}; William Freeman Tompkins Jr.^{(b. 1854; died 1908)}

William Freeman Tompkins Sr. (April 4, 1812 – August 17, 1871) was an American farmer, businessman, politician, and Wisconsin pioneer. He served two terms in the Wisconsin State Assembly, representing the city of Janesville in the 1850 and 1851 sessions. He was also one of the first proprietors of the Janesville Gazette. He served in elected office as a Whig but after the dissolution of that party, he joined the Democratic Party. He was described as an extremist for temperance, and the "Father of Temperance in Rock County".

== Biography ==
William Freeman Tompkins was born April 4, 1812, at Scipio, New York. His mother died shortly after his birth and his father died only a few years later.

Tompkins emerged in the Wisconsin Territory in the mid-1840s, as a politically active Whig, running for probate judge in 1844. He was unsuccessful in 1844, but won election as probate judge the next year, in 1845.

In December 1845, he purchased a share of the ownership of the Janesville Gazette newspaper, which had been founded earlier that year. He sold his share of the paper less than a year later, in September 1846.

Rock County in the early years of Wisconsin statehood was described as a Whig stronghold. Tompkins won two consecutive terms in the Wisconsin State Assembly, representing the Janesville Assembly district during the 1850 and 1851 legislative sessions.

Just after winning re-election to the Assembly, Tompkins was one of the founders of the Rock County Agricultural Society and one of its original officers.

After the Whig Party dissolved in the mid-1850s, Tompkins joined the Democratic Party. He went bankrupt during the American Civil War and left Wisconsin, ultimately moving to Abilene, Kansas, where he died in 1871.

== Personal life and family ==
William F. Tompkins was the last of seven children born to William Tompkins and his wife Anna (née Freeman).

On February 25, 1834, William F. Tompkins married Caroline Leach at Fleming, New York. They had four children together, though one daughter died in childhood. Their eldest son, Horace, enrolled in the Union Army in the American Civil War and served as a second lieutenant in the 19th Michigan Infantry Regiment. He was a prisoner of war for several years in Libby Prison, he died of disease at Nashville, Tennessee, in the final days of the war.

Wisconsin State Assembly
| Preceded by Anson W. Pope | Member of the Wisconsin State Assembly from Rock 1st district January 7, 1850 – January 5, 1852 | Succeeded by William A. Lawrence |
Legal offices
| Preceded by A. C. Bailey | Probate Judge of Rock County; January 1, 1846 – January 1, 1847 | Succeeded by C. S. Jordan |
