= Lloyd T. Pullen =

American politician (1825–1908)

Llyod T. Pullen

Member of the Wisconsin State Assembly
- In office 1861, 1863, 1876

Personal details
- Born: May 1, 1825 Anson, Maine, U.S.
- Died: January 14, 1908 (aged 82) Des Moines, Iowa, U.S.
- Party: Republican
- Occupation: Politician, farmer, writer

Lloyd T. Pullen (May 1, 1825 – January 14, 1908) was an American farmer, writer, and politician.

Born in the town of Anson, Somerset County, Maine, Pullen moved with his parents to Kingfield, Maine in 1832. In 1854, Pullen moved to the village of Argyle, Lafayette County, Wisconsin. In 1857, Pullen moved to Evansville, Wisconsin. He was a farmer and was in the mercantile business. Pullen served in different town local offices in Maine and Wisconsin. Pullen served in the Wisconsin State Assembly in 1861, 1863, and 1876 and was a Republican, Pullen died at his daughter's house in Des Moines, Iowa. In 1904, Pullen published: Pullen's Pencilings and Various Other Subjects, R. M. Antes, Evansville, Wisconsin: 1908.
