= Julius Hulburt =

American politician (1805–1881)

Julius Hulburt (November 4, 1805 – October 15, 1881), was an American politician. He was a member of the Wisconsin State Assembly.

He was born in New York. He married Sarah M. Vosburg. Both of them Baptists, they had four children and settled in what is now Green County, Wisconsin. Hulburt died on October 15, 1881.

One of Julius and Sarah's children, Chauncey, owned what is now known as the C.D. Hulburt House, listed on the National Register of Historic Places.

== Career ==
Hulburt was a member of the Assembly from 1850 to 1851. He was a member of the Whig Party.
