= Edward Vincent (Wisconsin politician) =

19th century American politician

Member of the Wisconsin State Assembly
- In office January 3, 1859 – January 2, 1860
- Preceded by: William Hubbard Stark
- Succeeded by: Thomas C. Westby
- Constituency: Rock 2nd district
- In office January 6, 1851 – January 5, 1852
- Preceded by: John A. Segar
- Succeeded by: Asal Kinney
- Constituency: Rock 4th district

Personal details
- Born: June 28, 1820 Almond, New York, U.S.
- Died: May 13, 1875 (aged 54) Fayette County, Illinois, U.S.
- Cause of death: Tuberculosis
- Resting place: Farina Cemetery, Farina, Illinois
- Party: Republican; Whig (before 1854)
- Spouses: Harriet L. Crandall (m. 1849; died 1868); Lydia Ofelia Mabel Maxson (m. 1869–1875)
- Children: with Harriet Crandall; Olive A. (Brockway) (Littleton) (Starkey)^{(b. 1849; died 1905)}; Lucinda C. (Ledbetter)^{(b. 1850; died 1933)}; Henry Vincent^{(b. 1858)}; with Lydia Maxson; Russell Edward Vincent^{(b. 1870; died 1938)}; Hattie Mabel (Crow)^{(b. 1875; died 1967)}
- Profession: Farmer, lawyer

Edward Vincent (June 28, 1820 – May 13, 1875) was an American farmer, lawyer, Republican politician, and Wisconsin pioneer. He served two years as a member of the Wisconsin State Assembly, representing Rock County during the 1851 and 1859 terms.

== Biography ==
Edward Vincent was born in the town of Almond, New York, in June 1820. He was raised and received his early education there before moving to Alfred, New York, with his family in the 1830s, where he briefly attended the Alfred Academy. At age 18, he began studying religion under Elder James H. Cochrane. In 1846, he moved with his father's family to the Wisconsin Territory, settling near what is now Milton, Wisconsin.

In 1850, Vincent was elected to the Wisconsin State Assembly, running on the Whig Party ticket. He served in the 4th Wisconsin Legislature. In 1854, he was a member of the first organizing meetings of the Republican Party in Rock County. In 1856, he took up the study of law at a law firm in Janesville, Wisconsin. He was admitted to the bar in 1859, that same year he served his second term in the Assembly, as a Republican.

In 1864, Vincent moved to Farina, Illinois, seeking a warmer climate to soothe his poor health. He continued practicing law in Illinois, and in 1865 was admitted to practice before the Supreme Court of Illinois. He had a successful law practice in Fayette County, Illinois, and was active until a few weeks before his death. He died of tuberculosis on May 13, 1875, at his home in Farina.

== Personal life and family ==
Edward Vincent was the seventh of 15 children born to Joshua Vincent Jr. and his wife Olive (née Spencer).

Edward Vincent married twice. He first married Harriet L. Crandall in 1849; they had three children together before her death in 1868. After his first wife's death, he married Lydia Maxson in January 1869, with whom he had two more children.

Wisconsin State Assembly
Preceded by John A. Segar	Member of the Wisconsin State Assembly from the Rock 4th district January 6, 1851 – January 5, 1852	Succeeded by Asal Kinney
Preceded by William Hubbard Stark	Member of the Wisconsin State Assembly from the Rock 2nd district January 3, 1859 – January 2, 1860	Succeeded by Thomas C. Westby
