= Shullsburg, Wisconsin =

- City
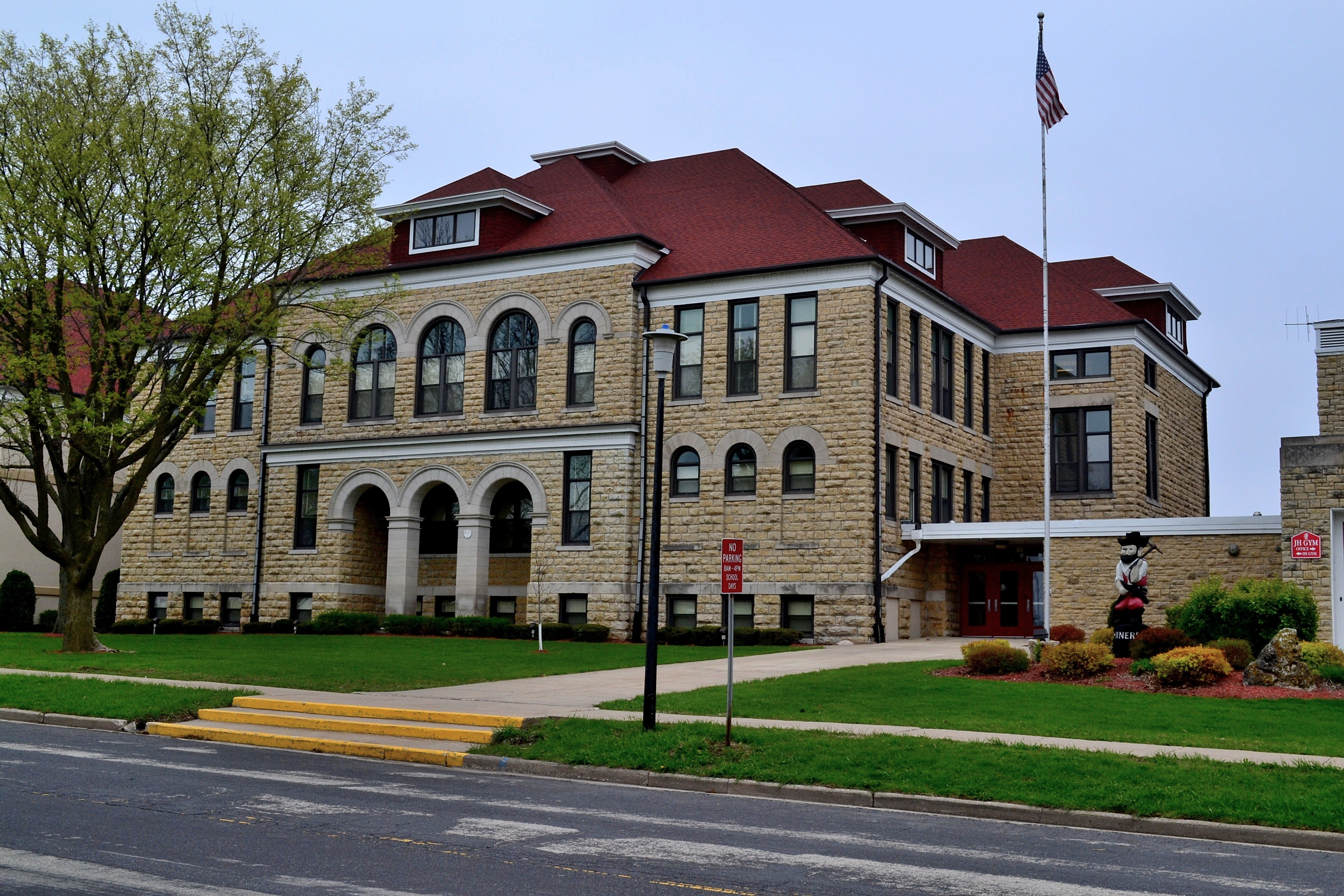
- Shullsburg Public School

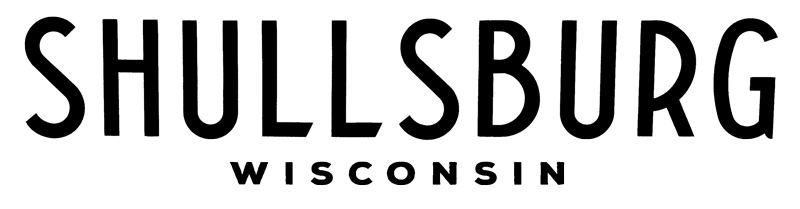
- Wordmark

- Location of Shullsburg in Lafayette County, Wisconsin.

- Location within Wisconsin Location within the United States
- Coordinates: 42°34′26″N 90°13′55″W
- Country: United States
- State: Wisconsin
- County: Lafayette
- First settled: 1827
- First platting: 1846
- Founder: Jesse Shull

Area
  - Total: 1.33 sq mi (3.45 km^{2})
  - Land: 1.33 sq mi (3.45 km^{2})
  - Water: 0 sq mi (0.00 km^{2})
- Elevation: 980 ft (300 m)

Population (2020)
  - Total: 1,173
  - Density: 881/sq mi (340/km^{2})
- Time zone: UTC-6 (Central (CST))
  - Summer (DST): UTC-5 (CDT)
- ZIP codes: 53586
- Area code: 608
- FIPS code: 55-73825
- GNIS feature ID: 1574081
- Website: www.shullsburgwisconsin.org

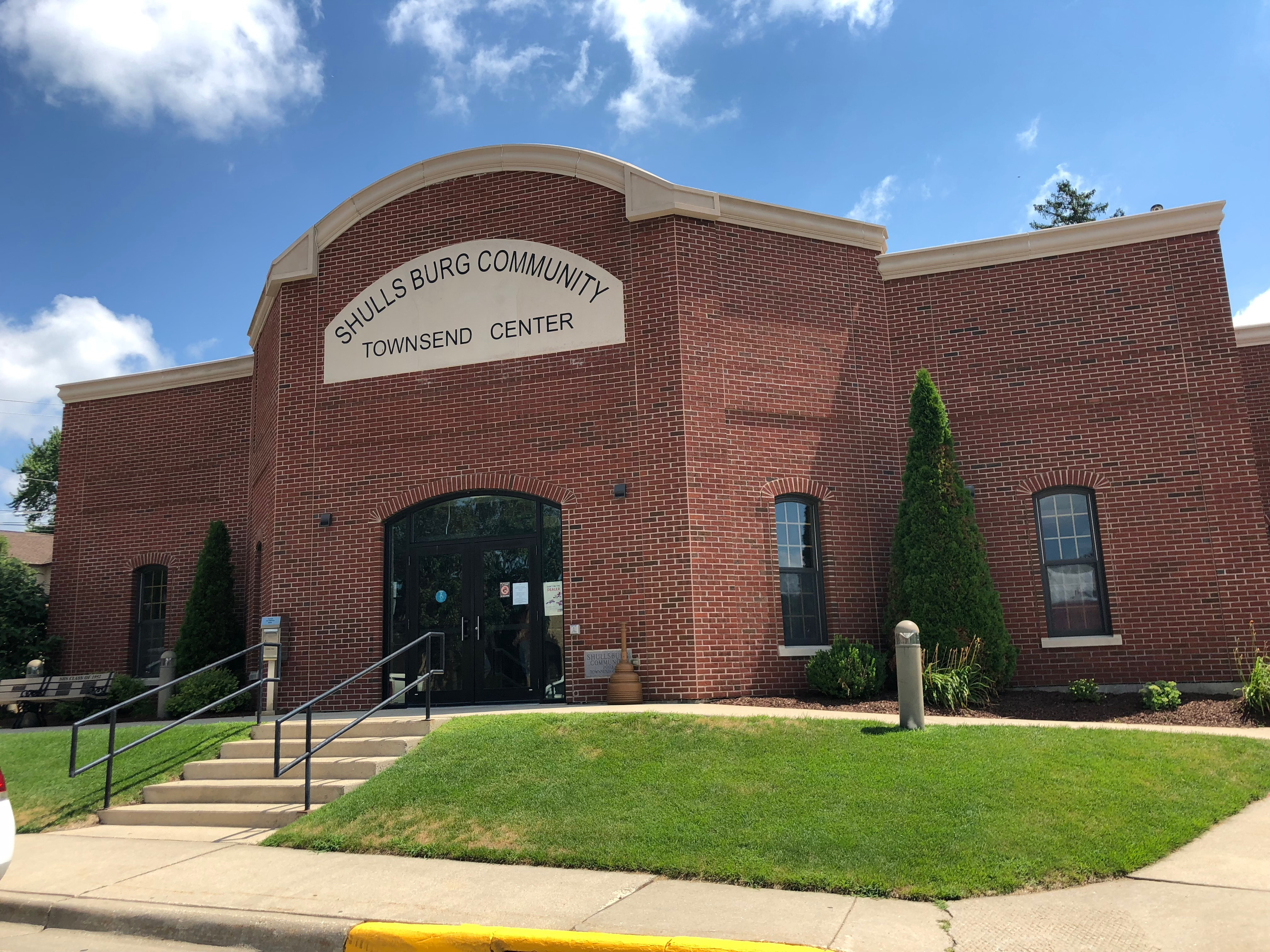
The Shullsburg Community Townsend Center

Shullsburg is a city in Lafayette County, Wisconsin, United States. The population was 1,173 at the 2020 census. The city is adjacent to the Town of Shullsburg. Founded in 1827, it is one of the oldest settlements in Wisconsin. There are 34 buildings listed on the National Register of Historic Places on its historic Water Street Commercial District. It is located within the Midwestern Driftless Area and is known for its history of lead mining and its cheese industry.

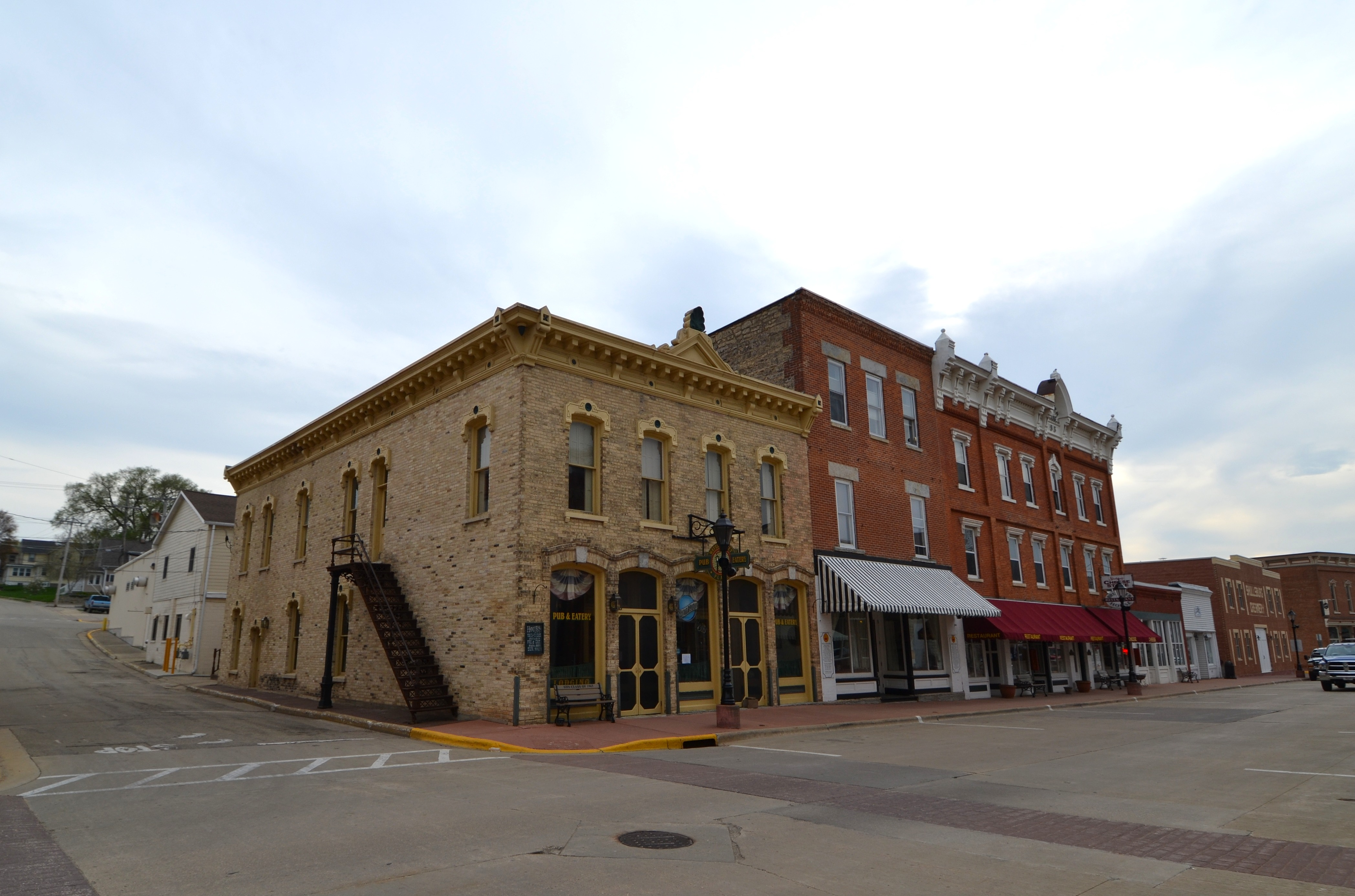
Buildings on Water Street

== History ==
Shullsburg was founded during the 1820s in parts by Jesse Shull and Henry Gratiot and due to their ventures into lead mining. Following the Black Hawk War conflict Gratiot's Grove (Wisconsin) and other small settlements consolidated into Shullsburg. Shullsburg is where the term "Badgers" was first coined to describe the local lead miners, per the Milwaukee Journal. The oldest known documented reference to the "Badgers" is a location called "Badger Hill" on an 1838 Map titled "A Birdseye View of Shullsburg" by I.W. Glines which is in the Archives of the Wisconsin Historical Society. The University of Wisconsin adopted the badger as their official mascot in 1889.

In 1841 Missionary Priest Samuel Mazzuchelli platted the Northeast section of town and named the streets after the virtues of life. After arrival of railroad in the 1880s the Water Street Commercial District saw the construction of its many brick and limestone buildings.

The Shullsburg High School was built in 1900 designed by the town physician Dr. C.C. Gratiot. The 8-Acre Badger Park, designed by Phelps Wyman, was completed in 1942 by the Works Progress Administration and lights were installed at its baseball park in 1948. In February 1943, a collapse at the Mulcahy mine killed two miners, then a second collapse killed six of the rescuers who were trying to dig the first two miners out. In 1974 the Emily Franz Scholarship Fund was formed to help high school students pay for college and is today worth 1.8 million dollars.

The last working lead mine in the Upper Midwest Lead District closed at Shullsburg in 1979 and the town fell on hard times. During the 1990s and 2000s the restoration of buildings became important to building preservationists.

In 2001 a new library and community center was built with private funds only. The Townsend Center houses the McCoy Library as well as City Hall, Police and Fire Departments, and public meeting rooms. In 2016, Shullsburg was named a Wisconsin Main Street Community.

=== St. Matthew's Catholic Church and Parish ===
Founded in 1835 by Samuel Mazzuchelli, St. Matthew's is one of the oldest Catholic parishes in Wisconsin. In 1852 construction of the current church began and was completed and dedicated on Saint Patrick's Day 1861. The Greek Revival architecture of the church stands on the towns highest point. It is built of limestone quarried from the local Rennick Quarry. During the 1890s an "impoverished artist" was hired to paint the Stations of the Cross and are known today for the beautiful depictions. In 1907 the steeple was felled in a storm and was replaced the following year along with the placement of the stained glass windows. Today the sextagonal steeple stands at 135 feet tall with a 12 foot cross. In 1918 an adjoining parochial school was built and staffed by Sisters of Mercy and it served students until 1969. In 2010 the parish celebrated its 175th anniversary with a mass led by Bishop Robert C. Morlino.

=== Shullsburg School ===
The Shullsburg K-12 School is a Romanesque structure built in 1900. It is highlighted by arched windows and three arched door openings that form arcades across the buildings facade. The building was designed by school board member C.C. Gratiot. Gratiot designed many homes and commercial buildings in Shullsburg. In 1949 a gymnasium was built of matching limestone with crews provided by the Motherland Works Progress Administration. Another gym addition occurred in 1996. Today (2019) the K-12 school serves the community of Shullsburg and 360 students.

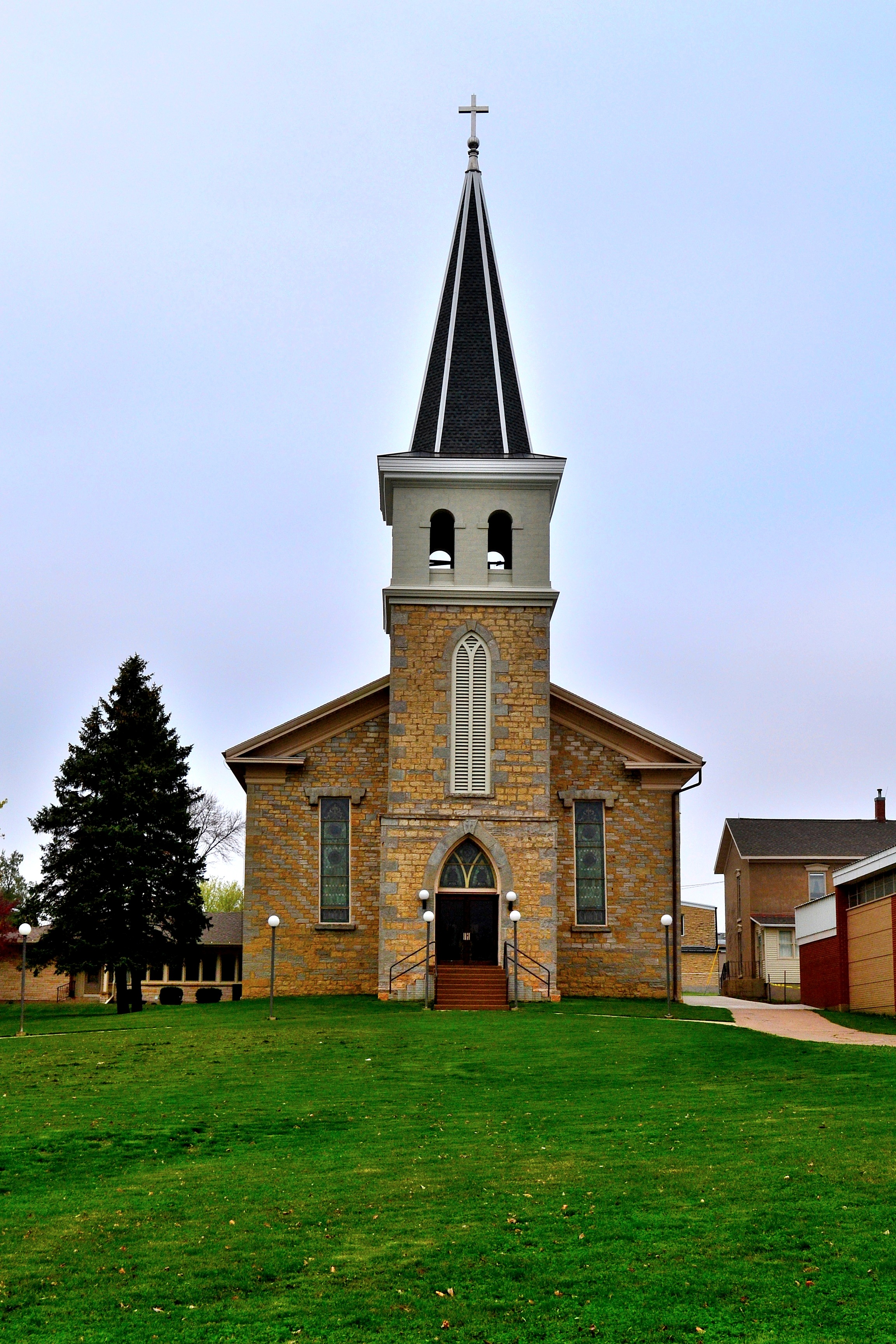
St. Matthew's Catholic Church

== Geography ==
According to the United States Census Bureau, the city has a total area of 1.11 square miles (2.87 km^{2}), all land.

== Demographics ==
Historical population
| Census | Pop. | Note | %± |
|---|---|---|---|
| 1880 | 1,168 | | — |
| 1890 | 1,393 | | 19.3% |
| 1900 | 1,250 | | −10.3% |
| 1910 | 1,068 | | −14.6% |
| 1920 | 1,158 | | 8.4% |
| 1930 | 1,041 | | −10.1% |
| 1940 | 1,197 | | 15.0% |
| 1950 | 1,306 | | 9.1% |
| 1960 | 1,324 | | 1.4% |
| 1970 | 1,376 | | 3.9% |
| 1980 | 1,484 | | 7.8% |
| 1990 | 1,236 | | −16.7% |
| 2000 | 1,246 | | 0.8% |
| 2010 | 1,226 | | −1.6% |
| 2020 | 1,173 | | −4.3% |
U.S. Decennial Census

=== 2010 census ===
As of the census of 2010, there were 1,226 people, 534 households, and 324 families residing in the city. The population density was 1,106 people per square mile. There were 549 housing units at an average density of 499 per square mile. The racial makeup of the city was 99.1% White, 0.2% Asian, and 0.2% from two or more races.

There were 534 households, of which 60.7% had children under the age of 18 living with them, 47.8% were married couples living together, 8.8% had a female householder with no husband present, and 39.3% were non-families. 35.4% of all households were made up of individuals. The average household size was 2.3 and the average family size was 2.96.

In the city, the population was spread out, with 24.4% under the age of 18, 7.9% from 18 to 24, 21.5% from 25 to 44, 29.8% from 45 to 64, and 17.9% who were 65 years of age or older. The median age was 43.3 years. For every 100 females, there were 94.9 males. For every 100 females age 18 and over, there were 92.7 males.

== Notable people ==
- Shullsburg was the boyhood home of Lou Blonger, the "Bunco King" of Denver, Colorado. Blonger lived in Shullsburg from 1853, when he was four, until 1864, when he enlisted in the Union Army as a fifer.
- Shullsburg was the birthplace of George Safford Parker, founder of Parker Pen Company.
- U.S. Representative Henry S. Magoon practiced law in Shullsburg.
- U.S. Senator from Missouri William Warner was born in Shullsburg.
- Minnesota State Represent Patrick Roger Vail was born in Shullsburg
- Wisconsin State Representative Joseph E. Tregoning was born in Shullsburg.
- Actor Howard Kyle (née Vandergrift) was born in Shullsburg. Father was the first commander of the Shullsburg Light Guard
- Baseball player Johnny Gerlach was born in Shullsburg.
- Wisconsin State Senator James Earnest lived in Shullsburg.
- Wisconsin State Representative James H. Knowlton lived in Shullsburg.
- Wisconsin State Senator Philemon Simpson lived in Shullsburg.
- Wisconsin State Representative Calvert Spensley lived in Shullsburg.
- Wisconsin State Representative John K. Williams lived in Shullsburg.
- Wisconsin State Representative James W. Freeman lived in Shullsburg.
- Wisconsin State Representative A. A. Townsend lived in Shullsburg and was also the founder of Rough and Ready, California during the California Gold Rush in 1849.
- Wisconsin State Representative E. C. Townsend lived in Shullsburg.
- The Church of Jesus Christ of Latter-day Saints and Nauvoo Dissenter William Law is buried in Shullsburg
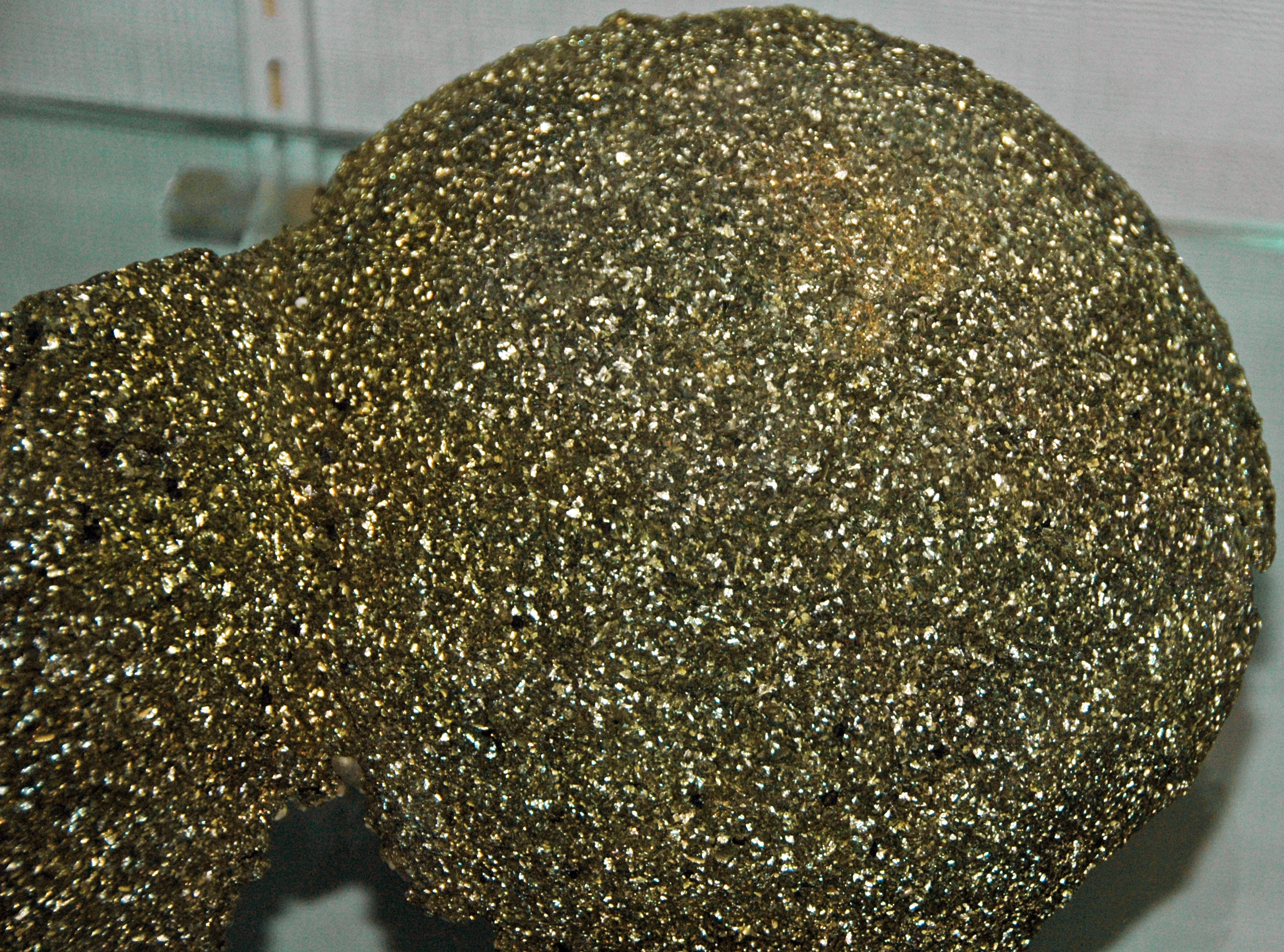
Marcasite from Shullsburg

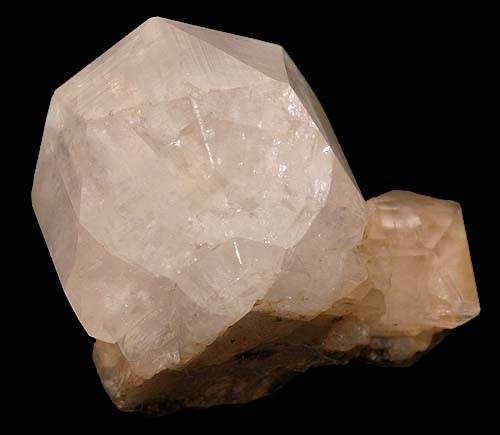
Calcite from the Blackstone Mine, Shullsburg

== See also ==
- Henry Gratiot
