= John K. Williams =

American politician

John K. Williams (1822–1880) was an American lawyer and legislator. Born on August 22, 1822, in McKean County, Pennsylvania, he studied law in Meadville, Pennsylvania and practiced law. In 1846, he moved to Shullsburg, Wisconsin Territory. Williams practiced law and managed farm property in Lafayette County, Wisconsin Territory. In 1850, he served in the Wisconsin State Assembly as a Democrat, succeeding fellow Democrat William H. Johnson. Williams was chief clerk in the Wisconsin State Senate in 1852 and 1853. He was also clerk of the Wisconsin Circuit Court for Lafayette and was regent for the University of Wisconsin. Williams died in Shullsburg, Wisconsin, on April 4, 1880.
