= Thomas Bainbridge (politician) =

American politician

Thomas Bainbridge (May 1, 1831 in County Durham, England – November 17, 1901 in Lafayette County, Wisconsin) was a member of the Wisconsin State Assembly during the 1872 and 1881 sessions. Other positions he held include Town Clerk of Benton (town), Wisconsin. He was a Republican. Bainbridge was born on May 1, 1831, in County Durham, England.
