= Francis Campbell (politician) =

American politician

Francis Campbell (1829–1897) was a member of the Wisconsin State Senate.

== Biography ==
Campbell was born on 13 June 1829 in County Donegal, Ireland. He settled in Gratiot (town), Wisconsin in 1849. On 1 January 1860, Campbell married Mary J. Cole. They had five children.

== Career ==
Campbell was elected to the Senate from the 11th District in 1872 and 1874. Other positions he held include Chairman of the Gratiot Town Board and Sheriff of Lafayette County, Wisconsin. He was a Republican.
