= Henry C. Hemingway =

American politician

Henry C. Hemingway was a member of the Wisconsin State Assembly during the 1851 session. He was a Whig.
