= Hamilton H. Gray =

19th century American politician

Member of the Wisconsin Senate from the 13th district
- In office January 4, 1869 – January 2, 1871
- Preceded by: James Earnest
- Succeeded by: Henry S. Magoon

Member of the Wisconsin State Assembly
- In office January 4, 1858 – January 3, 1859
- Preceded by: Henry W. Barnes
- Succeeded by: James S. Murphy
- Constituency: Lafayette 1st district
- In office January 7, 1856 – January 5, 1857
- Preceded by: A. A. Townsend
- Succeeded by: Joseph White
- Constituency: Lafayette 2nd district

District Attorney of Lafayette County, Wisconsin
- In office January 1, 1853 – January 1, 1855
- Preceded by: J. J. Marvin
- Succeeded by: George H. Lillie

Personal details
- Born: June 29, 1827 Madison, New York, U.S.
- Died: October 14, 1902 (aged 75) Omaha, Nebraska, U.S.
- Resting place: Union Grove Cemetery, Darlington, Wisconsin
- Party: Democratic
- Spouse: Harriet M. Peet (m. 1849–1902)
- Children: Toby Gray; Harriet M. (Armstrong)^{(b. 1852; died 1941)}; Martha Anna (Montgomery)^{(b. 1854; died 1936)}; Adaline Decker Gray^{(b. 1856; died 1952)}; James H. Gray^{(b. 1859; died 1924)}; Harry Hunter Gray^{(b. 1863; died 1885)}; Clara Montrose Gray^{(b. 1868; died 1891)}; three others

Hamilton Henry Gray (June 29, 1827 – October 14, 1902) was an American farmer, Democratic politician, and one of the founders of Darlington, Wisconsin. He was a member of the Wisconsin Legislature, representing Lafayette County for four years, and was a member of the University of Wisconsin Board of Regents in the 1870s.

== Biography ==
Hamilton H. Gray was born in Madison, New York, in June 1827. His father moved the family several times in his childhood, to Oneida County, New York, then to Monroe, Michigan, and finally Boone County, Illinois. At age 13, Hamilton went off on his own, traveling to the lead mining region of the Wisconsin Territory and seeking work. He mined $800 worth of lead (roughly $30,000 adjusted for inflation to 2022) and took the money to Belvidere, Illinois, where he entered a private academy for education. Then followed that up with a course in a private school in Beloit, Wisconsin Territory.

In 1846, Gray was offered an appointment to the United States Military Academy, but declined. Instead he began studying law under attorney John M. Keep in Beloit. John Keep was a land dealer as well as attorney, and he was incapacitated by illness only three months after Gray went to work under him. Gray took over Keep's land business and managed it for three years, then went to work for a larger land company. Through this company, he purchased much of the land on which the city of Darlington, Wisconsin, now stands. Also during this time, he opened mills and storehouses in Beloit to sell flour to new settlers in the region, and dealt in livestock with money from wealthy east-coast investors.

He devoted much of his attention to developing a settlement at Darlington, platting and laying out a plan for a village. And from the time Lafayette County was created, he worked to secure Darlington as the county seat, eventually succeeding. And although Gray was always a Democrat, he operated two newspapers in Darlington of opposing political ideologies.

He was elected district attorney of Lafayette County in 1852, serving a two-year term. He was then elected to the Wisconsin State Assembly in 1855, running on the Democratic ticket, and was elected again in 1857, serving in the Assembly during the 1856 and 1858 sessions. He assisted in organizing the Lafayette County Agricultural Society and became the first president of the organization.

He was narrowly elected to the Wisconsin State Senate in 1868, from the district representing all of Lafayette County. His Republican opponent, A. A. Townsend, challenged the results, but a Senate committee investigated that challenge and ruled in favor of Gray, voting unanimously to recognize his victory by 3 votes over Townsend.

The next year, he was chosen as the Democratic nominee for Lieutenant Governor of Wisconsin, but he lost the general election to Thaddeus C. Pound, receiving 46% of the vote.

While serving as state senator, he was appointed to the University of Wisconsin Board of Regents, serving through February 1874. During that time, he helped secure John Bascom as president of the University of Wisconsin.

He continued working in the land business for the rest of his life, operating in Wisconsin and Nebraska. He died during a visit to Omaha, Nebraska, at the home of his son-in-law, Carroll S. Montgomery.

== Personal life and family ==
Hamilton Gray was the eldest son of John Gray and his wife Clarinda (née Thompson). John Gray was a manufacturer and physician, who also ultimately relocated to Darlington.

In 1849, Hamilton Gray married Harriet Peet of Beloit, the daughter of Reverend Stephen Peet. They had ten children, but only six were still living at the time of his death.

== Electoral history ==
=== Wisconsin Senate (1868) ===
Wisconsin Senate, 13th District Election, 1868
Party	Candidate	Votes	%	±%
General Election, November 3, 1868
Democratic	Hamilton H. Gray	2,226	50.03%	
Republican	A. A. Townsend	2,223	49.97%	
Plurality		3	0.07%	
Total votes		4,449	100.0%	
Democratic hold				

=== Wisconsin Lieutenant Governor (1869) ===
Wisconsin Lieutenant Gubernatorial Election, 1869
Party	Candidate	Votes	%	±%
General Election, November 2, 1869
Republican	Thaddeus C. Pound	69,698	53.85%	
Democratic	Hamilton H. Gray	59,728	46.15%	
Plurality		9,970	7.70%	+4.60%
Total votes		129,426	100.0%	-9.12%
Republican hold				

Wisconsin State Assembly
Preceded by A. A. Townsend	Member of the Wisconsin State Assembly from the Lafayette 2nd district January 7, 1856 – January 5, 1857	Succeeded by Joseph White
Preceded by Henry W. Barnes	Member of the Wisconsin State Assembly from the Lafayette 1st district January 4, 1858 – January 3, 1859	Succeeded by James S. Murphy
Wisconsin Senate
Preceded by James Earnest	Member of the Wisconsin Senate from the 13th district January 4, 1869 – January 2, 1871	Succeeded by Henry S. Magoon
Legal offices
Preceded by J. J. Marvin	District Attorney of Lafayette County, Wisconsin; January 1, 1853 – January 1, 1855	Succeeded by George H. Lillie
