= Orson S. Head =

American attorney and politician (1817–1875)

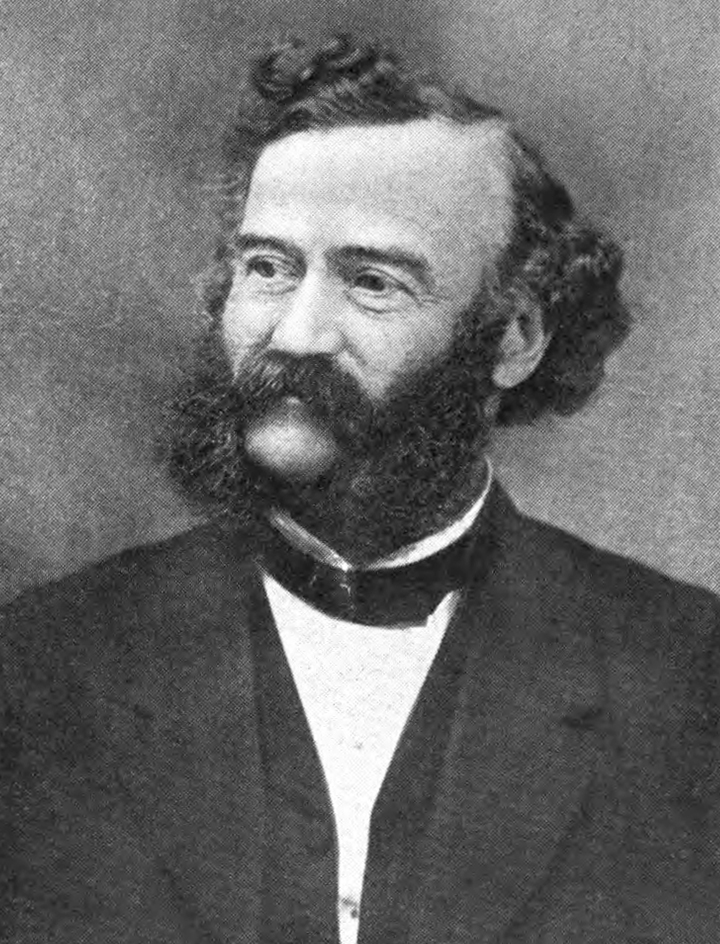

District Attorney of Kenosha County, Wisconsin
- In office January 3, 1859 – January 7, 1861
- Preceded by: Homer F. Schoff
- Succeeded by: Franklin H. Head

Member of the Wisconsin Senate from the 16th district
- In office January 28, 1851 – January 5, 1852
- Preceded by: Elijah Steele
- Succeeded by: John Sharpstein

Personal details
- Born: Orson Sherman Head; 9 October 1817 Paris, New York, U.S.
- Died: 19 February 1875 (aged 57) Kenosha, Wisconsin, U.S.
- Cause of death: Pneumonia
- Resting place: Green Ridge Cemetery, Kenosha, Wisconsin
- Party: Whig
- Spouses: Mary Jane Tradewell (m. 1846; died 1863); Mary S. Raymond (m. 1866–1875)
- Children: Mary Blanche (Gottfredsen)^{(b. 1847; died 1942)}; Dorothy Eunice (Wright)^{(b. 1849; died 1932)}; Jennie Lind (Thomas)^{(b. 1853; died 1942)}; at least 4 others
- Relatives: Orson Welles (great-grandson)
- Occupation: Attorney

Orson Sherman Head (October 9, 1817 – February 19, 1875) was an American lawyer and Wisconsin pioneer. He practiced law in Kenosha, Wisconsin, represented Kenosha County for one year in the Wisconsin State Senate (1851), and was district attorney from 1859 through 1861. His name was often abbreviated in historical texts as O. S. Head. He was a great-grandfather and namesake of the American screenwriter and filmmaker Orson Welles.

== Biography ==
Orson S. Head was born on October 9, 1817, in Paris, New York. He was raised on his father's farm and worked there throughout his youth along with his five brothers. He went on to study law in Utica, New York, under Horatio Seymour, who would later become Governor of New York. In 1841, he moved to the Wisconsin Territory, where he was admitted to the bar. Head settled in Kenosha, Wisconsin, and practiced law.

Known for his flaming red hair and beard, sturdy physique, and forceful personality, Head was elected prosecutor for Kenosha County three times. In 1851 he won a special election to fill a one-year vacancy in the Wisconsin State Senate caused by the sudden resignation of Elijah Steele.

Head died of pneumonia February 19, 1875, at his home in Kenosha, Wisconsin.

== Personal life and family ==
Orson S. Head was a descendant of John Alden, who was a crewmember of the Mayflower and settled at Plymouth Colony. Orson was the sixth of seven children born to Jonathan E. Head and Hephzibah Livermore Head.

Orson S. Head was married to Mary Jane Treadwell in 1846, and they had seven children. After his wife's death in 1863, he remarried with Mary S. Raymond; they had no additional children.

His eldest surviving daughter, Mary Blanche, married Richard Jones Wells; their son, Richard Hodgdon Head Welles, was the father of Orson Welles.

Wisconsin Senate
Preceded by Elijah Steele	Member of the Wisconsin Senate from the 16th district January 28, 1851 – January 5, 1852	Succeeded by John Sharpstein
Legal offices
Preceded by Homer F. Schoff	District Attorney of Kenosha County, Wisconsin; January 3, 1859 – January 7, 1861	Succeeded by Franklin H. Head
