= Morris S. Barnett =

American politician

Member of the Wisconsin State Assembly
- In office 1851
- In office 1857

Personal details
- Born: 1808
- Died: April 30, 1902 (aged 93–94) Neenah, Wisconsin, U.S.
- Party: Whig; Free Soil Party; Republican
- Occupation: Politician, businessman

Morris S. Barnett (1808 – April 30, 1902) was an American politician and businessman who served as a member of the Wisconsin State Assembly.

== Early life and career ==
Barnett owned and operated a sawmill in Eldorado, Wisconsin during the 1840s. Philetus Sawyer who later became a United States senator worked for Barnett at the sawmill during this period.

Barnett was active in the anti-slavery movement in Wisconsin. He later lived in Milwaukee, Wisconsin where he served on the Milwaukee County Board of Supervisors.

== Political career ==
Barnett later moved to Fond du Lac, Wisconsin. While living there he was elected to the Wisconsin State Assembly and served in 1851 and again in 1857.

During his political career he was affiliated with the Whig Party and the Free Soil Party. He later supported the Republican Party.

== Death ==
Barnett died of pneumonia on April 30, 1902, at the age of 94 at his son's home in Neenah, Wisconsin.
