= Nathan Olmsted =

American politician

Nathan Olmsted (October 17, 1812 – April 15, 1898) was an American lawyer and politician.

Born in Davenport, New York, Olmsted moved to Wisconsin Territory in 1838 and settled in Belmont, Wisconsin Territory. He was a lawyer and served as justice of the peace. Olmsted served in the Wisconsin State Assembly in 1851 and 1853. He died in Belmont, Wisconsin.
