= 5th Wisconsin Territorial Assembly =

Legislative term of the Wisconsin Territory

←	4th	Wisconsin Legislature; Minnesota Territory	→
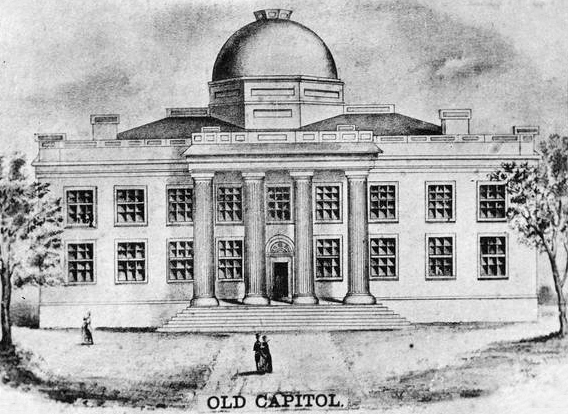
- Wisconsin State Capitol, 1855

Overview
- Legislative body: Legislative Assembly of the Wisconsin Territory
- Meeting place: Capitol Building, Madison
- Term: January 4, 1847 – May 29, 1848
- Election: September 28, 1846

Council
- Members: 13
- President: Horatio Wells (D)
- Party control: Democratic

House of Representatives
- Members: 26
- Speaker: William Shew (D)^{(1st session)}; Isaac P. Walker (D)^{(special session)}; Timothy Burns (D)^{(2nd session)}
- Party control: Democratic

Sessions
- 1st: January 4, 1847 – February 11, 1847
- 2nd: February 7, 1848 – March 13, 1848

Special sessions
- Special: October 18, 1847 – October 27, 1847

The Fifth Legislative Assembly of the Wisconsin Territory convened from January 4, 1847, to February 11, 1847, and from February 7, 1848, to March 13, 1848, in regular session. The Assembly also convened in special session from October 18, 1847, to October 27, 1847, to organize a second constitutional convention after the failure to adopt the first Wisconsin Constitution.

During this Assembly term, Wisconsin was attempting to achieve statehood. A constitution was drafted at a convention in the Fall of 1846 and was put to the voters at the spring election held April 6, 1847. The voters overwhelmingly rejected this document. New delegates were elected at a special election held November 29, 1847, and a new constitution was drafted that Winter. The new constitution was approved by the voters on March 13, 1848.

== Major events ==
- March 29, 1847: United States forces under General Winfield Scott took Veracruz after a siege.
- April 6, 1847: Wisconsin Territory voters rejected the 1st Constitution of Wisconsin.
- September 14, 1847: United States forces under General Winfield Scott entered Mexico City, marking the end of organized Mexican resistance.
- December 15, 1847 – February 1, 1848: The second Wisconsin constitutional convention was held in Madison, Wisconsin Territory.
- January 24, 1848: James W. Marshall found gold at Sutter's Mill, in Coloma, California, setting off the California Gold Rush.
- January 31, 1848: Construction of the Washington Monument began in Washington, D.C.
- February 2, 1848: The Treaty of Guadalupe Hidalgo ended the Mexican–American War.
- February 22 – February 24, 1848: Riots in Paris forced the abdication of King Louis Philippe I and the resignation of Prime Minister François Guizot in the French Revolution of 1848.
- March 13, 1848: Wisconsin Territory voters ratified the 2nd Constitution of Wisconsin.
- March 15, 1848: Mass protests in Pest forced the Austrian Empire to accept Hungarian claims of self-determination in the Hungarian Revolution of 1848.
- March 18, 1848: Hundreds were killed in a protest in Berlin associated with the German revolutions of 1848–1849.
- May 29, 1848: Wisconsin was admitted to the United States as the 30th U.S. state.

== Major legislation ==
- January 14, 1847: An Act to incorporate the Lawrence Institute of Wisconsin.
- February 4, 1847: An Act to incorporate the Nashotah House.
- October 27, 1847: An Act in relation to the formation of a State Government in Wisconsin, and to change the time for holding the annual session of the Legislature.

== Sessions ==
- 1st session: January 4, 1847 – February 11, 1847
- Special session: October 18, 1847 – October 27, 1847
- 2nd session: February 7, 1848 – March 13, 1848

== Leadership ==
=== Council President ===
- Horatio Wells (D) – during all three sessions

=== Speaker of the House of Representatives ===
- William Shew (D) – during 1st session
- Isaac P. Walker (D) – during the special session
- Timothy Burns (D) – during 2nd session

== Members ==
=== Members of the Council ===
Members of the Council for the Fifth Wisconsin Territorial Assembly:

Counties	Councillor	Session(s)			Party
Counties	Councillor	1st	Spec.	2nd	Party
Brown, Calumet, Columbia, Fond du Lac, Manitowoc, Marquette, Portage, & Winnebago	Mason C. Darling	✓	✓	✓	Dem.
Crawford, Chippewa, La Pointe, & St. Croix	Benjamin F. Manahan	✓	✓	✓	Dem.
Dane, Green, & Sauk	Alexander L. Collins	✓	✓	✓	Whig
Dodge & Jefferson	John E. Holmes	✓	✓	✓	Dem.
Grant	Orris McCartney	✓	✓	✓	
Iowa, Lafayette, & Richland	William Singer	✓			
Iowa, Lafayette, & Richland	Ninian E. Whiteside		✓	✓	Dem.
Milwaukee	Horation N. Wells	✓	✓	✓	Dem.
Racine	Frederick S. Lovell	✓	✓	✓	Dem.
Racine	Marshall Strong	✓			Dem.
Racine	Philo White		✓	✓	Dem.
Rock	Andrew Palmer	✓	✓	✓	Dem.
Sheboygan & Washington	Chauncey M. Phelps	✓	✓	✓	Dem.
Walworth	Henry Clark	✓	✓	✓	
Waukesha	Joseph Turner	✓	✓	✓	Dem.

=== Members of the House of Representatives ===
Members of the House of Representatives for the Fifth Wisconsin Territorial Assembly:

Counties	Representative	Session(s)			Party
Counties	Representative	1st	Spec.	2nd	Party
Brown, Calumet, Columbia, Fond du Lac, Manitowoc, Marquette, Portage, & Winnebago	Elisha Morrow	✓			
Brown, Calumet, Columbia, Fond du Lac, Manitowoc, Marquette, Portage, & Winnebago	Hugh McFarlane	✓			Dem.
Brown, Calumet, Columbia, Fond du Lac, Manitowoc, Marquette, Portage, & Winnebago	Moses S. Gibson		✓	✓	Whig
Brown, Calumet, Columbia, Fond du Lac, Manitowoc, Marquette, Portage, & Winnebago	George W. Featherstonhaugh Jr.		✓	✓	Dem.
Crawford, Chippewa, La Pointe, & St. Croix	Joseph W. Furber	✓			Whig
Crawford, Chippewa, La Pointe, & St. Croix	Henry Jackson		✓	✓	
Dane, Green, & Sauk	Charles Lum	✓			
Dane, Green, & Sauk	William A. Wheeler	✓			Dem.
Dane, Green, & Sauk	John W. Stewart	✓	✓	✓	Whig
Dane, Green, & Sauk	Elisha T. Gardner		✓	✓	Dem.
Dane, Green, & Sauk	Alexander Botkin		✓	✓	Whig
Dodge & Jefferson	George W. Green	✓			
Dodge & Jefferson	John T. Haight	✓			
Dodge & Jefferson	James Giddings	✓			Dem.
Dodge & Jefferson	Levi P. Drake		✓	✓	
Dodge & Jefferson	Horace D. Patch		✓	✓	Dem.
Dodge & Jefferson	James Hanrahan		✓	✓	
Grant	Armstead C. Brown	✓			Whig
Grant	William Richardson	✓			
Grant	Noah H. Virgin		✓	✓	Whig
Grant	Daniel R. Burt		✓	✓	Whig
Iowa, Lafayette, & Richland	Timothy Burns	✓	✓	✓	Dem.
Iowa, Lafayette, & Richland	James D. Jenkins	✓			Dem.
Iowa, Lafayette, & Richland	Thomas Chilton	✓			
Iowa, Lafayette, & Richland	Montgomery M. Cothren		✓	✓	Dem.
Iowa, Lafayette, & Richland	Charles Pole		✓	✓	Dem.
Milwaukee	William Shew	✓			Dem.
Milwaukee	Andrew Sullivan	✓			
Milwaukee	William W. Brown	✓			Whig
Milwaukee	Isaac P. Walker		✓	✓	Dem.
Milwaukee	James Holliday		✓	✓	Whig
Milwaukee	Asa Kinney		✓	✓	Dem.
Racine	Uriah Wood	✓			Whig
Racine	Elisha Raymond	✓			
Racine	G. F. Newell		✓	✓	Whig
Racine	Dudley Cass		✓	✓	
Rock	Jared G. Winslow	✓			
Rock	James M. Burgess	✓			
Rock	Daniel C. Babcock		✓	✓	
Rock	George H. Williston		✓	✓	Whig
Sheboygan & Washington	Harrison C. Hobart	✓			Dem.
Sheboygan & Washington	Benjamin H. Mooers		✓	✓ (Note: Resigned in protest February 25, 1848.)	Dem.
Walworth	Charles A. Bronson	✓			
Walworth	Palmer Gardiner	✓			
Walworth	Eleazer Wakeley		✓	✓	Dem.
Walworth	George Walworth		✓	✓	
Waukesha	Joseph Bond	✓			Dem.
Waukesha	Chauncey G. Heath	✓			Dem.
Waukesha	George B. Reed		✓	✓	Dem.
Waukesha	Leonard Martin		✓	✓	

== Employees ==
=== Council employees ===
- Secretary:
  - Thomas McHugh, all sessions
- Sergeant-at-Arms:
  - John Bevins, 1st session
  - Edward P. Lockhart, special & 2nd sessions

=== House employees ===
- Chief Clerk:
  - La Fayette Kellogg, all sessions
  - Assistant Clerk:
    - Thomas M. Fullerton
- Sergeant-at-Arms:
  - E. R. Hugunin, 1st & special sessions
  - John Mullanphy, 2nd session
