= 1849 United States Senate election in Wisconsin =

- January 17, 1849
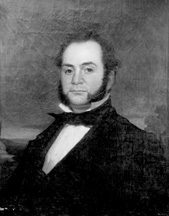

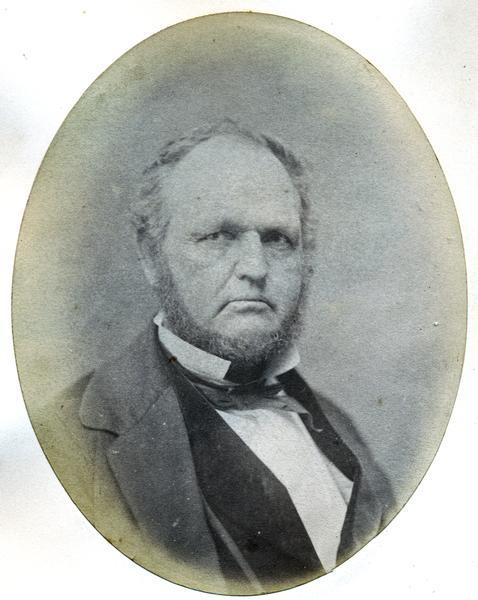

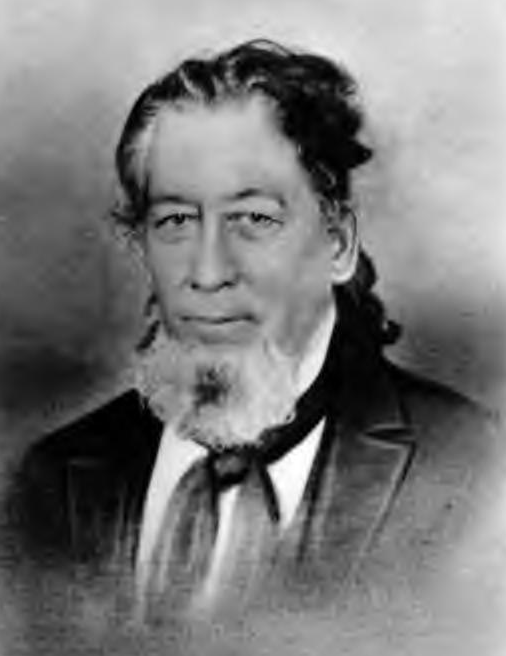
Nominee	Isaac P. Walker	Byron Kilbourn	Alexander Botkin
Party	Democratic	Free Soil	Whig
Legislative vote	45	18	18
Percentage	52.94%	21.18%	21.18%
U.S. senator before election
Isaac P. Walker
Democratic
Elected U.S. Senator
Isaac P. Walker
Democratic

The 1849 United States Senate election in Wisconsin was held in the 2nd Wisconsin Legislature on January 17, 1849. Incumbent Democratic U.S. senator Isaac P. Walker was re-elected to a full six-year term.

In the 1849 legislative session, Democrats held a majority in both chambers, but their majority was more tenuous due to the recent schism with the Free Soil Party. The schism, however, removed much controversy from the Democratic nominating process. At the election, the Democrats largely held together and managed to re-elect their nominee.

== Major candidates ==
=== Democratic ===
- Isaac P. Walker, the incumbent U.S. senator.

=== Free Soil ===
- Byron Kilbourn, one of the founders of Milwaukee and the incumbent mayor of Milwaukee at the time of the election.

=== Whig ===
- Alexander Botkin, an important pioneer of Wisconsin and an incumbent state senator from Dane County at the time of the election.

== Results ==
The 2nd Wisconsin Legislature met in joint session on January 17, 1849, to elect a U.S. senator. All 85 members of the legislature were present and voting for this election. Voting was mostly along party lines, with six of 50 Democrats defecting from their nominee. Walker won the election with just two votes to spare.

1st Vote of the 2nd Wisconsin Legislature, January 17, 1849
Party	Candidate	Votes	%
Democratic	Isaac P. Walker (incumbent)	45 (Note: Walker received the votes of all Democrats except senators Warren Chase and C. Latham Sholes (who voted for Kilbourn), representative Enoch Chase (who voted for Botkin), representative Solon Johnson (who voted for Doty), and representatives Paul Juneau and John F. Meade (who voted for Martin); he received one cross-over vote from Free Soil representative Morgan L. Noble.)	52.94%
Free Soil	Byron Kilbourn	18 (Note: Kilbourn received the votes of all Free Soilers except representative Morgan L. Noble (who voted for the Democratic nominee); he received two cross-over votes from Democratic senators Warren Chase and C. Latham Sholes, and he received two cross-over votes from Whig representatives Jonathan Daugherty and Milo Kelsey.)	21.18%
Whig	Alexander Botkin	18 (Note: Botkin received the votes of all Whigs except representatives Jonathan Daugherty and Milo Kelsey (who voted for Kilbourn), and his own vote (which he cast for Hamilton); he received one cross-over vote from Democratic representative Enoch Chase.)	21.18%
Democratic	Morgan Lewis Martin	2 (Note: Martin received votes from Democratic representatives Paul Juneau and John F. Meade.)	2.35%
Democratic	James Duane Doty	1 (Note: Doty received a vote from Democratic representative Solon Johnson.)	1.18%
Whig	William S. Hamilton	1 (Note: Hamilton received a vote from Whig senator Alexander Botkin.)	1.18%
Majority		43	50.59%
Total votes		85	100.0%
Democratic hold			
