= John Wesley Stewart =

19th century American politician

John W. Stewart
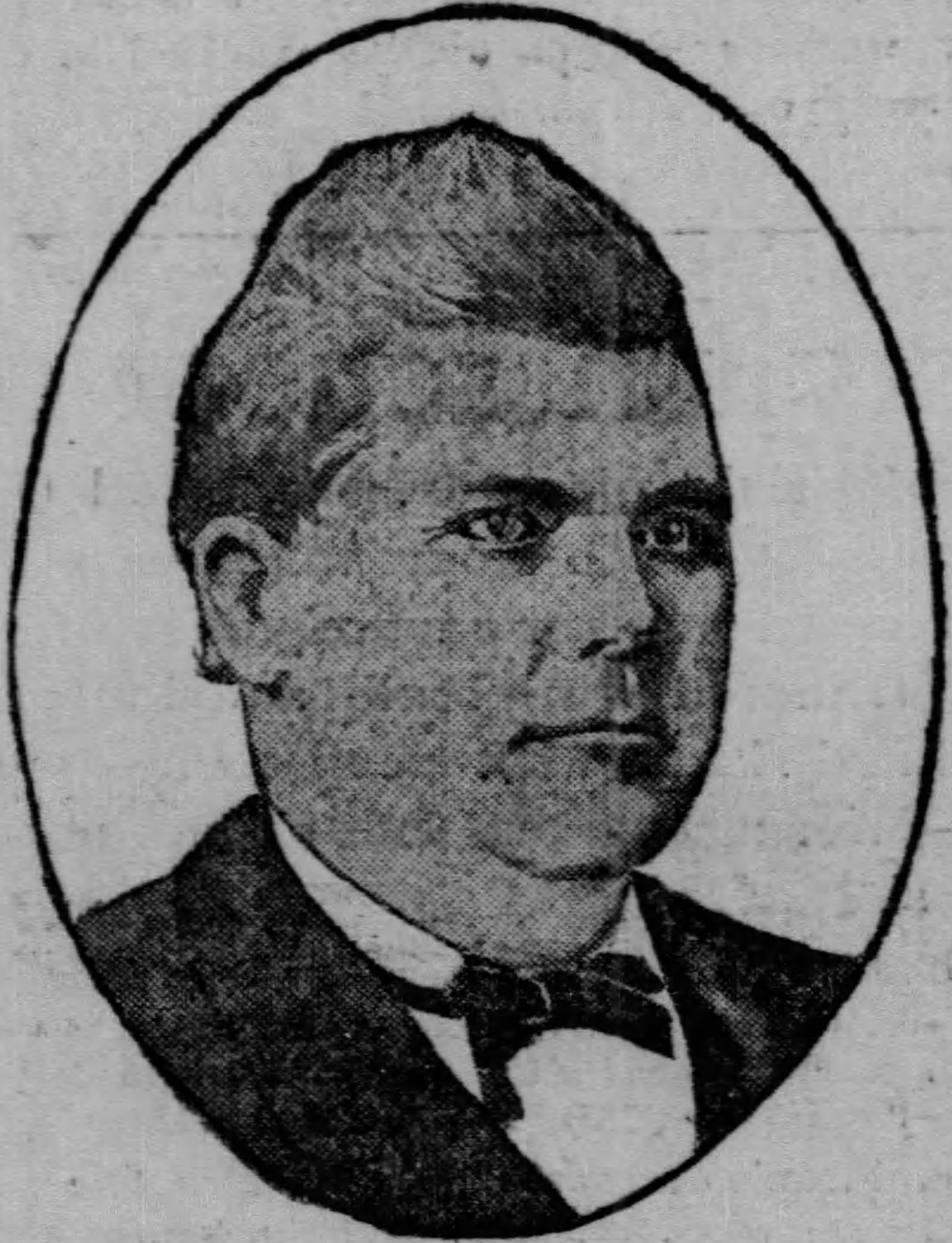
- Portrait from Chicago Tribune obituary

Chairman of the Cook County Board of Commissioners
- In office December 1, 1879 – December 1, 1880
- Preceded by: Henry Senne
- Succeeded by: D. B. Purington

Member of the Chicago City Council from the 4th ward
- In office 1876–1878 Serving with James H. Gilbert
- Preceded by: Rensselaer Stone
- Succeeded by: Herbert E. Mallory

Member of the Wisconsin Senate from the 24th district
- In office January 2, 1860 – January 6, 1862
- Preceded by: John Holden Warren
- Succeeded by: Edmund A. West

Member of the House of Representatives of the Wisconsin Territory for Dane, Green, and Sauk counties
- In office January 4, 1847 – May 29, 1848 Serving with Charles Lum (1847), William W. Wheeler (1847), Elisha T. Gardner (1847–1848), & Alexander Botkin (1847–1848)
- Preceded by: Position established
- Succeeded by: Position abolished

Personal details
- Born: June 1, 1822 Vincennes, Indiana, U.S.
- Died: September 7, 1899 (aged 77) Chicago, Illinois, U.S.
- Cause of death: Edema
- Resting place: Greenwood Cemetery, Monroe, Wisconsin
- Party: Republican; Whig (before 1854)
- Spouse: Armida Ann Bowen (m. 1843–1899)
- Children: Libbie Stewart^{(b. 1846; died 1902)}; John F. Stewart^{(b. 1849; )}; Charles Stewart^{(b. 1853; died 1853)}
- Education: Augusta College
- Profession: Lawyer

John Wesley Stewart (June 1, 1822 – September 7, 1899) was an American lawyer, banker, Republican politician, and Wisconsin pioneer. He was a member of the Wisconsin Senate, representing Green County during the 1860 and 1861 sessions. Before Wisconsin's statehood, he served in the lower house of the 5th Wisconsin Territorial Assembly. Later in life, he was active in Chicago politics, and was chairman of the Cook County Board of Commissioners in 1880. His name was often abbreviated as J. W. Stewart.

== Early life and education ==
John W. Stewart was born in Vincennes, Indiana, in June 1822. Due to his father's ministry, he traveled frequently during his childhood around southern Ohio, Kentucky, Indiana, and Illinois. At age 12, he went to work as an apprentice in the office of the Times newspaper in Troy, Ohio. He worked there for two years before returning to his education, attending the preparatory course at Ohio University, then attending Augusta College in Augusta, Kentucky, for three years.

== Wisconsin career ==
In the Spring of 1841, he traveled west to the Wisconsin Territory, taking a steamboat down the Ohio River to the Mississippi River, then up to Prairie du Chien. He arrived on March 4, 1841, to booming fanfare, due to the coincidence of William Henry Harrison's inauguration as president that day. After arriving at Prairie du Chien, he quickly made new acquaintances. He moved to the nearby town of Lancaster, where he went to work in the law offices of Barber & Dewey to study law. With the assistance of Barber and Dewey, he was appointed deputy clerk of the United States district court. He was soon admitted to the bar, and was also named postmaster of Lancaster. During his leisure time, he continued studying law with Barber and Nelson, who became lifelong friends.

After a year as postmaster, he moved east to Monroe, where he began his own legal practice. At that time, he was only the second practicing lawyer in what is now Green County, Wisconsin. He was appointed district attorney of Green County in 1843, and was called upon to prosecute the infamous case of Wisconsin territorial legislator James Russell Vineyard, who shot and killed fellow legislator Charles C. P. Arndt. The killing had occurred in February 1842, but in 1843 was brought to Green County as a change in venue. Stewart was assisted in the prosecution by Dane County district attorney Alexander L. Collins. Vineyard was ultimately acquitted, with the jury finding he acted in self-defense.

In 1846, then only 24 years old, he was elected to the 5th Wisconsin Territorial Assembly running on the Whig Party ticket. He was one of three at-large representatives of Dane, Green, and Sauk counties. Stewart went on to serve in both regular sessions of the 5th Legislative Assembly, and the special session called to prepare a second constitutional convention after the rejection of the first attempt at a Wisconsin constitution.

In 1851, he purchased the Green County Union newspaper, then a neutral paper, and turned it into the Monroe Sentinel, a partisan Whig newspaper. He employed as editor John Walworth, who was later an important figure in the founding of the Republican Party. He largely abandoned his legal career in the 1850s, instead becoming a real estate speculator, buying land from the federal government and selling to settlers.

When Monroe was incorporated as a village, Stewart was elected as the first village president.

Stewart was a member of the Whig Party state central committee in 1853, and joined the Republican Party after it was established in 1854. In 1859, he was elected to the Wisconsin Senate on the Republican Party ticket. He defeated Democrat Henry Adams in the general election and represented all of Green County in the 1860 and 1861 legislative sessions. During his term in the Senate, he was elected by the Legislature as one of their appointees to the University of Wisconsin Board of Regents.

During the 1850s, Stewart had served as a brigade paymaster in the Wisconsin militia. In 1862, he was appointed an allotment commissioner for Wisconsin regiments of the Union Army. He spent much of the American Civil War traveling to the various Wisconsin regiments spread across the theaters of the war to assist soldiers in directing their pay to their families back home.

== Chicago years ==
In 1867, Stewart began an extensive vacation through Europe. When he returned to the United States, he moved to Chicago. Before leaving Wisconsin, he had been a part owner of the State Bank of Monroe, and after the federal banking law, he became an original shareholder in the Second National Bank of Freeport, Illinois.

Stewart was subsequently elected to the Chicago City Council and was part of the "reform city council" of Mayor Monroe Heath. While on the council (1876–1878), he held a seat representing the city's fourth ward, andwas the author of the measures to abolish and re-organize the board of public works and the city health department.

Stewart was subsequently elected as a representative of Chicago on the Cook County Board of Commissioners, and was elected chairman of the county board in December 1879. He ran for another term as chairman in December 1880, but was defeated by D. B. Purington.

In his later years, he resided mostly in Daytona, Florida. He died of Drospy at his home in Evanston, Illinois, on September 7, 1899.

== Personal life and family ==
John W. Stewart was a son of Reverend John Stewart, a Methodist minister of the Ohio conference. Although a fourth generation American, his family was almost entirely of Scottish descent.

John W. Stewart married Armida Ann Bowen, a daughter of another prominent Wisconsin Territory lawyer, William Bowen. They had at least three children, though at least one died in infancy. Their only known surviving son, John F. Stewart, followed his father to Chicago and also worked extensively in city government.

== Electoral history ==
=== Wisconsin Senate (1859) ===
Wisconsin Senate, 24th District Election, 1859
Party	Candidate	Votes	%	±%
General Election, November 8, 1859
Republican	John W. Stewart	1,633	58.16%	+1.64%
Democratic	Henry Adams	1,175	41.84%	
Plurality		458	16.31%	+3.28%
Total votes		2,808	100.0%	+41.82%
Republican hold				

Wisconsin Senate
Preceded by John Holden Warren	Member of the Wisconsin Senate from the 24th district January 2, 1860 – January 6, 1862	Succeeded by Edmund A. West
Political offices
Preceded by Henry Senne	Chairman of the Cook County Board of Commissioners; December 1, 1879 – December 1, 1880	Succeeded by D. B. Purington
