= Isaac P. Walker =

19th century American politician

Isaac Pigeon Walker
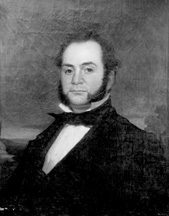

United States Senator from Wisconsin
- In office June 8, 1848 – March 3, 1855
- Preceded by: Position established
- Succeeded by: Charles Durkee

Speaker of the House of Representatives of the Wisconsin Territory
- In office October 18, 1847 – October 27, 1847
- Preceded by: William Shew
- Succeeded by: Timothy Burns

Member of the House of Representatives of the Wisconsin Territory for Milwaukee County
- In office October 18, 1847 – March 13, 1848 Serving with James Holliday & Asa Kinney
- Preceded by: William Shew, Andrew Sullivan, & William W. Brown
- Succeeded by: Position abolished

Probate Judge of Milwaukee County
- In office January 1847 – June 1848
- Preceded by: Clinton Walworth
- Succeeded by: James B. Cross

Member of the Illinois House of Representatives from the Vermilion County district
- In office December 3, 1838 – November 23, 1840 Serving with Asa Elliott & John H. Murphy
- Preceded by: George Barnett & George Scarborough
- Succeeded by: John J. Brown, Isaac Froman, & John Canady

Personal details
- Born: November 2, 1815 Wheeling, Virginia, U.S. (now West Virginia)
- Died: March 29, 1872 (aged 56) Milwaukee, Wisconsin, U.S.
- Resting place: Forest Home Cemetery, Milwaukee
- Party: Democratic
- Spouses: "Miss Yohn" (died 1841); Elizabeth Hastings Whitney (m. 1841–1872)
- Children: 3
- Relatives: George H. Walker (brother)

Isaac Pigeon Walker (November 2, 1815 – March 29, 1872) was an American lawyer, Democratic politician, and Wisconsin pioneer. He was one of Wisconsin's first United States senators, serving from 1848 through 1855. In the Senate, he was best known for his support of radical land reform; much of what he proposed was enacted as the Homestead Act of 1862 after he left office. His political career, however, was prematurely ended by the complicated politics of pre-Civil War slavery compromises—Walker was always personally opposed to slavery, but endorsed a compromise on handling the Mexican Cession which was anathema to his anti-slavery Wisconsin electorate.

Before Wisconsin statehood, he served in the House of Representatives of the Wisconsin Territory, and was speaker for one session during the 5th Wisconsin Territorial Assembly. Before coming to Wisconsin, he also served one term in the Illinois House of Representatives.

Isaac P. Walker was a younger brother of George H. Walker, one of the founders of Milwaukee, Wisconsin, and Milwaukee's 5th mayor.

== Early life in Illinois ==
Isaac Walker was born in what is now Wheeling, West Virginia, (then part of Virginia) in 1815. As a child, he moved with his family to Shawneetown, Illinois, where he was raised and educated. Before reaching adulthood, he moved to Danville, Illinois, where he worked as a store clerk and pursued his education. He then read law in the law offices of Samuel McRoberts; he was admitted to the bar in 1834 and became a junior partner to McRoberts.

In Danville, Walker also became involved in politics with the Democratic Party. At the young age of 23, in the fall of 1838, he was elected as one of three members elected at large to represent Vermilion County, Illinois, in the Illinois House of Representatives for the 11th Illinois General Assembly. He did not run for re-election in 1840, but was honored by the Democratic Party as one of its six proposed presidential electors for the 1840 United States presidential election; Martin Van Buren lost the election but won the state of Illinois, enabling Walker to cast his electoral vote. Notably, Abraham Lincoln was a candidate on the defeated Illinois Whig Party electoral slate.

During 1840, Walker was attacked by another future-Milwaukeean, the infamously foul-tempered Edward George Ryan. Ryan circulated a handbill attacking Walker's character. Walker responded suggesting that this was a personal dispute over Walker's vote on the impeachment of judge John Pearson.

When Samuel McRoberts was elected United States senator in 1841, he transferred his entire legal practice to Walker.

== Wisconsin career ==
In December 1841, Walker moved north to the Wisconsin Territory, following his brother, George H. Walker, who had founded a settlement that became part of the city of Milwaukee a few years later. Walker brought his legal practice to Milwaukee, and quickly became one of the most active lawyers in the territory.

He continued his political activities in Wisconsin and gave particular attention to the Wisconsin Territory's large recent-immigrant community, pushing for including non-citizens as eligible electors in the territory's votes on statehood and constitutional convention delegates. In the fall of 1846, he was elected probate judge for Milwaukee County. That winter, he also campaigned and advocated extensively for the adoption of the first constitution of Wisconsin, but that document was rejected by voters. After the referendum, Walker was elected to represent Milwaukee County in the House of Representatives of the Wisconsin Territory at the special session of the 5th Wisconsin Territorial Assembly. He was chosen as speaker for that session, which passed a number of acts to set another constitutional convention and prepare another legislative session in early 1848. Voters ratified the Constitution of Wisconsin produced by the second constitutional convention in 1848, and Wisconsin was admitted to the Union on May 29, 1848.

== U.S. Senate ==
One of the first duties of the 1st Wisconsin Legislature was electing two senators to represent Wisconsin in the United States Senate. Democrats held large majorities in both chambers, so would have little difficulty electing Democratic senators. In a caucus of the Democratic legislators, they selected Walker and former governor Henry Dodge as their nominees for U.S. Senate. Walker was described as a more progressive Democrat, whereas Dodge represented more conservative constituencies. The legislature met in joint session the following day, on June 8, 1848, and elected Walker and Dodge. Walker drew the short straw between the two, and became a member of Senate Class 3, with his initial term expiring in March 1849.

Walker's arrival in the Senate coincided with a significant moment in the saga of American slavery and the quest for its abolition, namely the end of the Mexican–American War and the introduction of a vast new territory to the country. Walker, like many northern Democrats of his era, was personally opposed to slavery, but would frequently compromise for political reasons with his southern colleagues. A key issue at the time was the Wilmot Proviso, which proposed to prohibit the expansion of slavery into newly-acquired territories. The issue resulted in a schism in the Democratic Party, when Democrats nominated Lewis Cass and William O. Butler for president and vice president; Cass and Butler had both opposed the Wilmot Proviso. The schism was led by former president Martin Van Buren, who led his "barnburners" to found the Free Soil Party. Walker remained loyal to the Democratic ticket, and campaigned extensively for Cass; he also wrote a letter explaining his views to Wisconsin Free Soil Party leader Warren Chase, which was frequently cited over the subsequent years. Cass lost the presidential election however, defeated by Whig Zachary Taylor.

Despite the schism, Democrats still held an outright majority in the 2nd Wisconsin Legislature, and nominated Walker for re-election to the U.S. Senate. Walker received all but six of the Democratic votes in the election, and won a full six-year term as senator.

Shortly after the start of his next term, he faced another critical moment in the slavery debate, when he proposed a compromise to enable the organization of the entire Mexican Cession as a territory governed by the President without restrictions on the expansion of slavery. Many Wisconsin Democrats, including partisan newspapers that had endorsed Walker's election, were outraged by his position; the Wisconsin Legislature, with many Democratic votes in favor, then took the extraordinary step of passing a joint resolution explicitly calling for Walker's resignation. Walker reacted indignantly, explaining that his attempt to find a compromise to organize the territory was due to his fear that without reaching a compromise, the territory of California would attempt to become a separate country hostile to the United States. Walker then appeared at the 1849 Democratic state convention in Wisconsin, and attempted to justify his actions, but his reaction further alienated his former allies, and he was essentially disowned by the state Democratic Party. Ultimately, the Congress agreed on a different compromise to organize the western territory, California was admitted to the Union as a free state. During the work to pass that compromise, Walker briefly upset the proceedings by proposing a one-sentence amendment to ban peon slavery, a form of unfree labor among Native American workers in California and New Mexico. The compromise temporarily relieved some of the tension over the slavery issue, and Walker subsequently recovered some of his support such that, in 1851, the 4th Wisconsin Legislature voted to rescind their previous request for his resignation.

During 1850, Walker also gave an impassioned and persuasive speech on the subject of land reform that earned him significant populist attention. This stand briefly earned him the attention of Tammany Hall party leaders, who floated his name as a potential presidential candidate in 1852. In the fall of 1850, the New-York Tribune wrote up a list of potential candidates for 1852, describing Walker as the candidate of the "Young Democracy". Ongoing ambivalence toward Walker in his home state doomed that effort, however.

In the Senate, Walker was also an advocate for a more aggressive and interventionist American foreign policy, saying that the U.S. had outgrown the need for what he described as the timid neutrality of the early republic. He spoke on behalf of exiled Hungarian governor-president Lajos Kossuth during his visit to the United States in 1852, and used that occasion to advocate for America to support nascent democratic movements in Europe against existing European monarchies and empires.

Although his political career was essentially ended by his earlier slavery compromise, near the end of his Senate term, Walker did vote with the anti-slavery position on the pivotal Kansas–Nebraska Act in 1854. He also remained an outspoken advocate for his land reform proposals, coming close to passing a version of his plan in 1854; his proposals ultimately became law after he left office with the Homestead Act of 1862.

== Later years ==
While serving in the Senate, Walker had purchased a large farm estate in the town of Eagle, in Waukesha County, Wisconsin, where he spent a great deal of time immediately after leaving office. Walker was induced to return to politics less than a year later; in the fall of 1855, there was a schism in the Democratic Party of Waukesha County, with the seceding group seeking to nominate Walker as their candidate for Wisconsin Senate in the 10th Senate district. Walker initially refused the nomination, in favor of the regularly-nominated Democratic candidate Edward Gernon, but later accepted the nomination citing what he described as massive corruption in state government. With a Republican candidate, Nelson Z. Strong, also on the ballot, Walker received about 36% of the vote. Gernon prevailed with about 40%. Although he lost the election, Walker was later recognized as one of the Democrats who blew the whistle on the massive railroad land grant corruption scheme that would blow up into public awareness less than a year later.

After the 1855 election, Walker largely retired from politics, and spent much of the rest of his life devoted to his legal practice. As a lawyer, Walker was known as a skilled and persuasive trial attorney, and an expert in patent law. He briefly returned to politics in 1859 to campaign against the Democratic gubernatorial nominee, Harrison Carroll Hobart; Hobart had been speaker of the Assembly in 1849 when the Legislature passed the resolution calling for his resignation. In the 1860 election, Walker quietly supported Stephen A. Douglas.

During the American Civil War, Walker was an enthusiastic supporter of the Union cause. He made several speeches early in the war calling for Union Army volunteers, and was a leader in the "Loyal Democrat" movement in the state. In the 1864 presidential election, Walker endorsed Lincoln's re-election.

== Personal life and family ==
Isaac P. Walker was the second son and fourth of six children born to George Reynolds Walker and his wife Rebecca (née Hamer). Isaac's elder brother, George H. Walker, came to the Wisconsin Territory in the 1830s and established a settlement at what is now the south side of the city of Milwaukee. The area is still referred to as Walker's Point. George H. Walker was also elected mayor of Milwaukee in 1851. Both of Walker's parents and one sister also eventually moved to Wisconsin.

Isaac Walker married twice. His first wife, a Miss Yohn, died in 1841. (Note: I only found one source for the existence of this wife, but since that source is his state bar biography, I felt it had to be included.) Shortly after his first wife's death, he married Elizabeth Hastings Whitney on June 23, 1841. He had three children with his second wife, but only one survived to adulthood.

Walker died of a stroke at the Newhall House hotel in Milwaukee, on March 29, 1872. He was buried at Milwaukee's historic Forest Home Cemetery.

== Electoral history ==
=== U.S. Senate (1848, 1849) ===
United States Senate Election in Wisconsin, 1848
Party	Candidate	Votes	%
1st Vote of the 1st Wisconsin Legislature, June 8, 1848 (top two)
Democratic	Isaac P. Walker	61	77.22%
Democratic	Henry Dodge	60	75.95%
Whig	Alexander L. Collins	18	22.78%
Whig	Edward V. Whiton	17	21.52%
Whig	John Hubbard Tweedy	1	1.27%
Whig	William S. Hamilton	1	1.27%
	Absent	5	
Majority		40	50.63%
Total votes		79	92.94%
Democratic win (new seat)			
Democratic win (new seat)			

United States Senate Election in Wisconsin, 1849
Party	Candidate	Votes	%
1st Vote of the 2nd Wisconsin Legislature, January 17, 1849
Democratic	Isaac P. Walker (incumbent)	45	52.94%
Free Soil	Byron Kilbourn	18	21.18%
Whig	Alexander Botkin	18	21.18%
Democratic	Morgan Lewis Martin	2	2.35%
Democratic	James Duane Doty	1	1.18%
Whig	William S. Hamilton	1	1.18%
Majority		43	50.59%
Total votes		85	100.0%
Democratic hold			

== Notes ==
U.S. Senate
New state	U.S. senator (Class 3) from Wisconsin; June 8, 1848 – March 3, 1855; Served alongside: Henry Dodge	Succeeded by Charles Durkee
