= William W. Brown (Wisconsin politician) =

American politician

Member of the Wisconsin State Assembly from the Milwaukee 3rd district
- In office June 5, 1848 – January 1, 1849
- Preceded by: Position established
- Succeeded by: Julius White

Representative to the Legislative Assembly of the Wisconsin Territory from Milwaukee County
- In office January 4, 1847 – October 18, 1847 Serving with William Shew and Andrew Sullivan
- Preceded by: Samuel H. Barstow, John Crawford, James Magone, Benjamin H. Mooers, Luther Parker, and William H. Thomas (Milwaukee & Washington counties)
- Succeeded by: Isaac P. Walker, James Holliday, and Asa Kinney

Personal details
- Born: Albany, New York, U.S.
- Died: October 3, 1871 Milwaukee, Wisconsin, U.S.
- Cause of death: Tuberculosis
- Party: Whig
- Nickname: "Double-head"

William Wells Brown or W. W. Brown (died October 3, 1871) was an American merchant and pioneer settler of Milwaukee, Wisconsin. He was a member of the Wisconsin State Assembly for the 1st Wisconsin Legislature (1848).

== Early Years in Wisconsin Territory ==
Brown came early to Milwaukee, a contemporary of George H. Walker, Byron Kilbourn, and Don A. J. Upham. The first ship built in Milwaukee, the 30-ton sloop Wenona, was built for Brown by George Barber in 1835. By 1842, Brown also owned the 100-ton schooner Fur Trader, and was an active merchant in Milwaukee (his Wm. Brown and Company was one of the first businesses in Milwaukee). He was sometimes called "Double-Headed Brown" to distinguish him from another William Brown, with whom he was at one time in business partnership.

He served as a contractor building the mile-long canal in Milwaukee for Kilbourn and Increase Lapham's Rock River Canal Company, which was begun in April 1841 and ready for use by December 1842. This was the only portion of the canal which would ever be built; the bed thereof later became Commerce Street in Milwaukee's Beerline B neighborhood.

== Legislative service and political activism ==
He served in the House of Representatives of the Wisconsin Territory for one term representing Milwaukee County in the first 1847 session. After statehood, he was elected in 1848 to the 3rd Milwaukee County Assembly district (the 3rd Ward of the City of Milwaukee). He was not a candidate for re-election in the 1848 fall election, and was succeeded by fellow Whig Julius White. Brown ran again for the Assembly in 1849 but was not successful, losing to Democrat Edward McGarry.

In 1851, he came in 7th out of 8 candidates for alderman in the Third Ward. He was successful in 1852, coming in first out of four candidates.

He was elected as a delegate to the 1852 Whig National Convention, and in 1852 was the Whig candidate for Sheriff of Milwaukee County.

== Private life ==
In 1851, he was among the incorporators (along with Kilbourn, Upham and others) of the Milwaukee and Humboldt Plank Road Company.

Milwaukee pioneer historian James Smith Buck described Brown's final years as follows:

Few men have ever lived in Milwaukee who were more widely known, or less thought of (when we take into consideration his ability, for he was a very smart man,) than William W. Brown. Had he devoted his talents to a proper use, his memory would have been respected; but he did not, and finally died, deserted and alone. I shall never forget the look of utter despair that sat upon his face as I met him for the last time, in October, 1871... wending his weary way to the European Hotel, which he never left again alive; it said plainly enough, "This is the end of a misspent life."... He died a few days later, and I remember the difficulty his few remaining friends (and I could name them all,) had, to get help enough to get his body from his room to the hearse.

At the time of his death (of "quick consumption"), he was described as "well known through the State as a great wag".
