= 2nd Wisconsin Legislature =

Wisconsin legislative term for 1849

←	1st	3rd	→
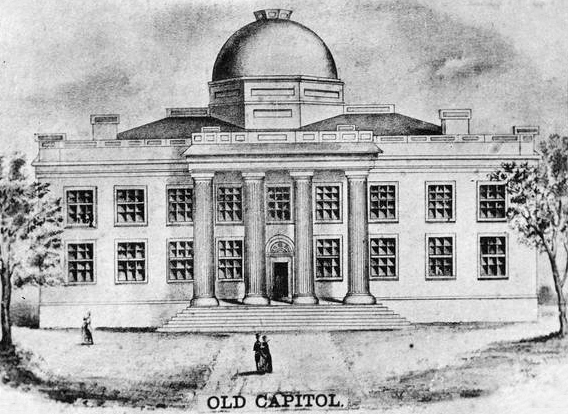
- Wisconsin State Capitol, 1855

Overview
- Legislative body: Wisconsin Legislature
- Meeting place: Wisconsin State Capitol
- Term: January 1, 1849 – January 7, 1850
- Election: November 7, 1848

Senate
- Members: 19
- Senate President: John Edwin Holmes
- Party control: Democratic

Assembly
- Members: 66
- Assembly Speaker: Harrison Carroll Hobart
- Party control: Democratic

Sessions
- 1st: January 10, 1849 – April 2, 1849

The Second Wisconsin Legislature convened from January 10, 1849, to April 2, 1849, in regular session. Senators representing odd numbered districts were newly elected for this session and were serving the first year of a two-year term. Senators representing even numbered districts were serving the second year of their two-year term.

The governor of Wisconsin during this entire term was Democrat Nelson Dewey, of Grant County, serving his first full year in office after winning election in the state's first gubernatorial election in May 1848, and taking office in June 1848.

== Major events ==
- January 17, 1849: Isaac P. Walker re-elected United States Senator by the Wisconsin Legislature in joint session.
- March 4, 1849: Inauguration of Zachary Taylor as the 12th President of the United States.
- November 6, 1849: Nelson Dewey re-elected Governor of Wisconsin.

== Major legislation ==
- February 8, 1849: Joint resolution related to Slavery and the Slave trade, 1849 Joint Resolution 2
- March 6, 1849: Act to extend the boundaries of the county of Marquette, 1849 Act 73
- March 8, 1849: Act in relation to the boundaries of the counties of Columbia, Adams, Sauk, Chippewa, La Pointe, and St. Croix, 1849 Act 77
- March 8, 1849: Act to extend the boundaries of Winnebago county, 1849 Act 79
- March 10, 1849: Joint resolution relative to a proposed amendment to the constitution of the United States, concerning the election of Senators in congress, 1849 Joint Resolution 5
- March 22, 1849: Act submitting the question of the extension of the right of suffrage to a vote of the People, 1849 Act 137. Setting a referendum for the 1849 general election which would grant voting rights to African Americans living in Wisconsin. The referendum passed, but the legality was challenged. The Wisconsin Supreme Court finally upheld the result of the 1849 referendum in the 1866 case of Gillespie v Palmer and others.
- March 31, 1849: Joint resolution instructing the Hon. Isaac P. Walker to resign his seat as United States Senator, 1849 Joint Resolution 9.
- March 31, 1849: An Act in relation to homicide. Created Wisconsin's first law criminalizing abortion.

== Party summary ==
=== Senate summary ===
Senate partisan composition Democratic: 14 seats Free Soil: 1 seat Whig: 4 seats

	Party (Shading indicates majority caucus)			Total	
	Dem.	F.S.	Whig	Total	Vacant
End of previous Legislature	16	0	3	19	0
1st Session	14	1	4	19	0
Final voting share	74%	5%	21%		
Beginning of the next Legislature	13	2	4	19	0

=== Assembly summary ===
Assembly partisan composition Democratic: 36 seats Free Soil: 14 seats Whig: 16 seats

	Party (Shading indicates majority caucus)			Total	
	Dem.	F.S.	Whig	Total	Vacant
End of previous Legislature	49	0	17	66	0
1st Session	36	14	16	66	0
Final voting share	55%	21%	24%		
Beginning of the next Legislature	43	8	15	66	0

== Sessions ==
- 1st Regular session: January 10, 1849 – April 2, 1849

== Leaders ==
=== Senate leadership ===
- President of the Senate: John E. Holmes, Lieutenant Governor

=== Assembly leadership ===
- Speaker of the Assembly: Harrison Carroll Hobart

== Members ==
=== Members of the Senate ===
Members of the Wisconsin Senate for the Second Wisconsin Legislature (19):

Senate partisan representation Democratic: 14 seats Free Soil: 1 seat Whig: 4 seats

District	Counties	Senator	Party	Residence
01	Brown, Calumet, Manitowoc, Sheboygan	Lemuel Goodell	Dem.	Stockbridge
02	Columbia, Marquette, Portage, Sauk	Henry Merrill	Whig	Fort Winnebago
03	Crawford, Chippewa, St. Croix, La Pointe	James Fisher	Dem.	Eastman
04	Fond du Lac, Winnebago	Warren Chase	Dem.	Ceresco
05	Iowa, Richland	Montgomery M. Cothren	Dem.	Mineral Point
06	Grant	George W. Lakin	Whig	Platteville
07	Lafayette	Dennis Murphy	Dem.	Shullsburg
08	Green	Elisha T. Gardner	Dem.	Monroe
09	Dane	Alexander Botkin	Whig	Madison
10	Dodge	William M. Dennis	Dem.	Watertown
11	Washington	Frederick W. Horn	Dem.	Cedarburg
12	Jefferson	Myron B. Williams	Dem.	Watertown
13	Waukesha	Frederick Sprague	Dem.	Eagleville
14	Walworth	John W. Boyd	Dem.	Geneva
15	Rock	Otis W. Norton	Whig	Milton
16	Racine (Southern half)	C. Latham Sholes	Dem.	Kenosha
17	Racine (Northern half)	Victor Willard	Free Soil	Waterford
18	Milwaukee (Southern half)	Asa Kinney	Dem.	Milwaukee
19	Milwaukee (Northern half)	John B. Smith	Dem.	Milwaukee

=== Members of the Assembly ===
Members of the Assembly for the Second Wisconsin Legislature (66):

Assembly partisan representation Democratic: 36 seats Free Soil: 14 seats Whig: 16 seats

Senate District	Counties		Representative	Party	Residence
01	Brown		John F. Meade	Dem.	Green Bay
01	Calumet		Alonzo D. Dick	Whig	Manchester
02	Columbia		Joseph Kerr	Whig	Columbia
03	Crawford & Chippewa		James O'Neill	Dem.	Black River
09	Dane	1	Charles Rickerson	Dem.	Medina
09	Dane	2	Ira W. Bird	Whig	Madison
09	Dane	3	Samuel H. Roys	Dem.	Dunkirk
10	Dodge	1	Paul Juneau	Dem.	Theresa
10	Dodge	2	Hiram Barber	Dem.	Fairfield (now Oak Grove)
10	Dodge	3	George G. King	Dem.	Shields
10	Dodge	4	Jedediah Kimball	Dem.	Portland
10	Dodge	5	Parker Warren	Free Soil	Beaver Dam
04	Fond du Lac	1	Morgan L. Noble	Free Soil	Fond du Lac
04	Fond du Lac	2	Jonathan Daugherty	Free Soil	Rosendale
06	Grant	1	Robert R. Young	Whig	Hazel Green
06	Grant	2	James Russell Vineyard	Dem.	Platteville
06	Grant	3	Davis Gillilan	Dem.	Potosi
06	Grant	4	Robert M. Briggs	Whig	Beetown
08	Green		John C. Crawford	Whig	Monroe
05	Iowa & Richland	1	Jabez Peirce	Dem.	Mineral Point
05	Iowa & Richland	2	Timothy Burns	Dem.	Franklin
12	Jefferson	1	Benjamin Nute	Dem.	Milford
12	Jefferson	2	Jarvis K. Pike	Whig	Cold Spring
12	Jefferson	3	William H. Johnson	Dem.	Fort Atkinson
03	La Pointe & St Croix		Joseph Bowron	Dem.	St. Croix Falls
07	Lafayette	1	Daniel Morgan Parkinson	Dem.	Fayette
07	Lafayette	2	William Hill	Dem.	New Diggings
01	Manitowoc		Charles Kuehn	Dem.	Two Rivers
02	Marquette		Satterlee Clark Jr.	Dem.	Green Lake
19	Milwaukee	1	James B. Cross	Dem.	Milwaukee
19	Milwaukee	2	Zelotus A. Cotton	Dem.	Milwaukee
18	Milwaukee	3	Julius White	Whig	Milwaukee
18	Milwaukee	4	Stoddard H. Martin	Free Soil	Milwaukee
18	Milwaukee	5	John Flynn Jr.	Dem.	Oak Creek
18	Milwaukee	6	Enoch Chase	Dem.	Lake
19	Milwaukee	7	Robert Wason Jr.	Dem.	Granville
02	Portage		John Delany	Dem.	Plover
17	Racine	1	Marshall Strong	Free Soil	Racine
17	Racine	2	James DeNoon Reymert	Free Soil	Norway
17	Racine	3	Maurice L. Ayers	Free Soil	Burlington
16	Racine	4	Otis Colwell	Free Soil	Southport
16	Racine	5	Hermon S. Thorp	Free Soil	Bristol
15	Rock	1	Anson W. Pope	Whig	Janesville
15	Rock	2	Samuel G. Colley	Free Soil	Beloit
15	Rock	3	Lucius H. Page	Whig	Fulton
15	Rock	4	Paul Crandall	Whig	Lima
15	Rock	5	Josiah F. Willard	Free Soil	Rock
02	Sauk		Cyrus Leland	Dem.	Prairie du Sac
01	Sheboygan	1	Harrison Carroll Hobart	Dem.	Sheboygan
01	Sheboygan	2	Jedediah Brown	Dem.	Sheboygan Falls
14	Walworth	1	Samuel Pratt	Free Soil	Spring Prairie
14	Walworth	2	Enos Hazard	Whig	La Grange
14	Walworth	3	Samuel D. Hastings	Free Soil	Geneva
14	Walworth	4	George H. Lown	Free Soil	Walworth
14	Walworth	5	Milo Kelsey	Whig	Delavan
11	Washington	1	Solon Johnson	Dem.	Port Washington
11	Washington	2	James Fagan	Dem.	Jackson
11	Washington	3	Peter Turck	Dem.	Mequon
11	Washington	4	Patrick Toland	Dem.	Erin
11	Washington	5	Chauncey M. Phelps	Dem.	Addison
13	Waukesha	1	William H. Thomas	Dem.	Lisbon
13	Waukesha	2	D. Henry Rockwell	Dem.	Oconomowoc
13	Waukesha	3	Albert Alden	Dem.	Delafield
13	Waukesha	4	John M. Wells	Free Soil	Prairieville
13	Waukesha	5	Thomas Sugden	Whig	Eagle
04	Winnebago		Thomas J. Townsend	Whig	Winnebago

== Employees ==
=== Senate employees ===
- Chief Clerk: William Rudolph Smith
- Assistant Clerk: P. N. Bovee
- Enrolling Clerk: G. W. Boardman
- Engrossing Clerk: Henry B. Welsh
- Transcribing Clerk: William Dutcher
- Messenger: Moritz Morgenstine
- Doorkeeper: J. S. Delno
- Fireman: S. B. Sibley
- Sergeant-at-Arms: W. Shellmer

=== Assembly employees ===
- Chief Clerk: Robert L. Ream
- Chief Clerk pro tem: Daniel Noble Johnson
- Assistant Clerk: William Hull
- Assistant Clerk pro tem: Alexander T. Gray
- Enrolling Clerk: Aaron V. Fryer
- Engrossing Clerk: J. J. Driggs
- Transcribing Clerk: Lyman Cowderey
- Messenger: Marshall Ten Eyk
- Doorkeeper: C. W. White
- Fireman: Samuel Noyes
- Sergeant-at-Arms: Felix McLinden
