= Horatio Wells =

American politician (1808–1858)

The Honorable Horatio Wells

County Judge of Milwaukee County, Wisconsin
- In office January 7, 1850 – January 2, 1854
- Preceded by: Position established
- Succeeded by: Charles E. Jenkins

2nd Mayor of Milwaukee
- In office April 1847 – April 1848
- Preceded by: Solomon Juneau
- Succeeded by: Byron Kilbourn

President of the Council of the Wisconsin Territory
- In office January 4, 1847 – May 29, 1848
- Preceded by: Nelson Dewey
- Succeeded by: Position abolished

2nd Attorney General of the Wisconsin Territory
- In office December 1839 – December 1841
- Governor: Henry Dodge
- Preceded by: Henry S. Baird
- Succeeded by: Mortimer M. Jackson

Member of the Council of the Wisconsin Territory from Milwaukee County
- In office January 4, 1847 – May 29, 1848
- Preceded by: James Kneeland, Jacob H. Kimball, and Curtis Reed (Milwaukee & Washington)
- Succeeded by: Position abolished

Personal details
- Born: November 4, 1808 Hinesburg, Vermont, U.S.
- Died: August 8, 1858 (aged 49) Milwaukee, Wisconsin, U.S.
- Resting place: Forest Home Cemetery, Milwaukee, Wisconsin
- Party: Democratic
- Spouse: Augusta Vail (m. 1842–1858)

Horatio Nelson Wells (November 4, 1808 – August 8, 1858) was an American lawyer, Democratic politician, and Wisconsin pioneer. He was the 2nd mayor of Milwaukee, Wisconsin, and the 2nd attorney general of the Wisconsin Territory. He also served as the last president of the Council (upper legislative house) of the Wisconsin Territory (during the 5th Wisconsin Territorial Assembly).

== Biography ==
Wells was born in Hinesburg, Vermont, and studied law in Burlington, Vermont. After practicing law in the East for several years, he moved to the Wisconsin Territory in 1836. In Milwaukee, he entered a legal partnership with Hans Crocker called Wells & Crocker.

As a lawyer, Wells was prolific in the first ten years of his career. According to Berryman's History of the Bench and Bar of Wisconsin, his success as an advocate was mostly due to his wit, his intuitive knowledge of human nature, and a vast array of useful anecdotes.

Wells was served as a member of the lower house of the Legislative Assembly of the Wisconsin Territory from 1839 to 1840, as Attorney General for the Territory of Wisconsin from 1839 to 1841.

After a short break from elected office, Wells served as a member of the upper house of the Legislative Assembly from 1847 to 1848, where he was also selected as president of the council. Wells also served a short stint as mayor of Milwaukee from 1847 to 1848.

In the 2nd Wisconsin Legislature new county-level courts were established, and, in the first election for Milwaukee County judge, Wells was elected to a four-year term, serving from 1850 to 1854.

Wells also ran the Milwaukee Sentinel for a short time in 1841. he died in Milwaukee Wisconsin in 1858

== Personal life ==
Wells was known to be an alcoholic and his alcoholism factored significantly in accounts of his decline and death.

Political offices
Preceded by Solomon Juneau	Mayor of Milwaukee; April 1847 – April 1848	Succeeded by Byron Kilbourn
Legal offices
Preceded by Henry S. Baird	Attorney General of the Wisconsin Territory; December 1839 – December 1841	Succeeded by Mortimer M. Jackson
New office	County Judge of the Milwaukee County, Wisconsin; January 7, 1850 – January 2, 1854	Succeeded by Charles E. Jenkins
