= James Holliday =

James Holliday may refer to:

- Bug Holliday (James Wear Holliday, 1867–1910), American baseball player
- James Holliday (politician) (1818–1851), American lawyer and politician in Wisconsin
