= Joseph Kerr (disambiguation) =

Joseph Kerr (1765–1837) was a United States senator from Ohio.

Joseph Kerr may also refer to:

- Joseph Kerr (Canadian politician) (died 1902), merchant and politician from Ontario, Canada
- Joseph Kerr (Wisconsin politician) (died 1855), American politician
- Joe Kerr, an alias used by the DC Comics character Joker
