= Moses S. Gibson =

19th century American politician

Member of the Wisconsin State Assembly from the Ashland–Burnett–Douglas–La Pointe–Polk–St. Croix district
- In office January 3, 1859 – January 17, 1859
- Preceded by: James B. Gray
- Succeeded by: Marcus W. McCracken

Members of the House of Representatives of the Wisconsin Territory for Brown, Calumet, Columbia, Fond du Lac, Manitowoc, Marquette, Portage, & Winnebago counties
- In office October 18, 1847 – May 29, 1848 Serving with George W. Featherstonhaugh Jr.
- Preceded by: Elisha Morrow & Hugh McFarlane
- Succeeded by: Position abolished

Personal details
- Born: 1816 Livingston County, New York, U.S.
- Died: December 6, 1904 (aged 87–88) Washington, D.C., U.S.
- Resting place: Arlington National Cemetery, Arlington County, Virginia
- Party: Republican (after 1854); Whig (before 1854)
- Spouse: Carrie F. Gilman (m. 1856–1904)
- Children: Mary (Chesley)

Military service
- Allegiance: United States
- Branch/service: United States Volunteers; Union Army
- Years of service: 1862–1863
- Rank: Major, USV
- Battles/wars: American Civil War

Moses S. Gibson (1816 – December 6, 1904) was an American banker, Republican politician, and Wisconsin pioneer. Initially a merchant in the early days of Fond du Lac, Wisconsin, he then became one of the first settlers at Hudson, Wisconsin, where he was receiver of federal moneys and register of the land office. He was a delegate to Wisconsin's first constitutional convention, in 1846; after the rejection of that constitution, he was elected to the Wisconsin Territory House of Representatives for the special session and 2nd session of the 5th Wisconsin Territorial Assembly.

He was a Whig politician and became a member of the Republican Party when that party was established in 1854. He ran for election to the Wisconsin State Assembly in 1858; he was initially declared the winner of that election and took office at the start of the 12th Wisconsin Legislature; his election was successfully challenged by his opponent, Marcus W. McCracken, and McCracken took over the seat two weeks after the start of the legislative term. Later in life Gibson served as an assistant auditor in Washington, D.C., for the United States Post Office Department.

== Biography ==
Gibson was born in 1816 in Livingston County, New York. He received a common school education in New York and worked as a merchant. In 1844, he traveled to the Wisconsin Territory, bringing a stock of merchandise to Sheboygan. Finding no market there for his merchandise, he traveled over land to the west, arriving two days later at what is now Fond du Lac, Wisconsin. He decided to settle at Fond du Lac and opened a store there. At the time there were just five frame buildings and two log houses in the settlement. Gibson quickly became a prominent member of the community and was elected to the first Wisconsin constitutional convention in 1846.

When Fond du Lac was incorporated as a village in 1847, Gibson was elected as one of the first members of the village board of trustees. That August, Gibson was elected to the Wisconsin Territory House of Representatives for the special session of the 5th Wisconsin Territorial Assembly, running on the Whig Party ticket. He and his co-representative, George W. Featherstonhaugh Jr. of Brothertown, represented roughly the entire northeast quadrant of the Wisconsin Territory. They continued to represent the district in the 2nd session of the same legislative term.

In 1849, Gibson was appointed by President Zachary Taylor to serve as receiver of public moneys for the land office at the far northwestern Wisconsin settlement of Willow River—now Hudson, Wisconsin. His appointment was confirmed by the United States Senate in 1850, and he was later promoted to register of the same office.

After several years in that role, in 1853 his name was circulated as a candidate for statewide office on the Whig Party ticket. Newspapers mentioned him as a potential candidate for Bank Comptroller or Secretary of State. Gibson was not nominated that year, and with the inauguration of Democratic president Franklin Pierce, he was not renominated to his role in the land office. The following year, however, the Republican Party was established by former Whigs and Free Soilers. Gibson received the Republican nomination for Wisconsin Senate in the 19th Senate district. The 19th district then comprised roughly the entire northwest quadrant of the state, extending all the way north and west of Crawford County. The election was quite competitive, and in the end he lost to William J. Gibson by about 53 votes.

At the September 1855 Republican Party state convention, Gibson was unanimously elected chairman of the convention. At that convention, he was also considered as a candidate for lieutenant governor of Wisconsin. He received 35 of 108 votes in the first informal ballot and withdrew his name from the race. Nevertheless, he still received 88 votes at the first formal ballot and 62 at the second formal ballot, after which he moved that Charles Sholes be declared the nominee by acclamation.

In 1858, Gibson ran for office again, running for a seat in the Wisconsin State Assembly. The Assembly district then comprised about half of the northeast quadrant of the state. Again, the election was incredibly close; his opponent Marcus W. McCracken received the most votes, but Gibson was declared the winner after several votes were thrown out because they were cast by residents with a Native American parent or grandparent in a decision by Wisconsin circuit court judge George W. Cate. Gibson proceeded to take office at the start of the 12th Wisconsin Legislature, but McCracken challenged the results and brought his complaint to the Assembly. The Assembly referred the question to a select committee, which examined evidence and testimony and quickly ruled in McCracken's favor. Gibson relinquished his seat on January 17, 1859.

Later that year, Gibson was a delegate to the state convention again and was a candidate for state bank comptroller, but lost on the first ballot to Gysbert Van Steenwyk.

During the Civil War, he was appointed a paymaster for United States Volunteers. He was assigned to St. Louis, Missouri, but resigned after about a year due to poor health. Rather than returning to Wisconsin, however, Gibson remained in St. Louis to open a collections agency on behalf of soldiers and widows.

In 1878, he was appointed a position in the sixth auditor's office of the treasury in the United States Post Office Department. He remained at that position for 26 years, until just a few weeks before his death. He died at his home in northwest Washington, D.C., on December 6, 1904, and was buried at Arlington National Cemetery.

== Personal life and family ==
Moses Gibson married Carrie F. Gilman in August 1856. They were survived by one child, their daughter Mary.
