= John Flynn Jr. =

American politician

John Flynn, Jr. (c. 1820 - ?) was an American farmer from Oak Creek, Wisconsin who served a single one-year term in 1849 in the 2nd Wisconsin Legislature representing the 5th Milwaukee County Wisconsin State Assembly district (the Towns of Oak Creek and Franklin), succeeding Andrew Sullivan. He was assigned to the standing committee on agriculture and manufactures. He was a Democrat, as had been Sullivan. He was succeeded in the next Assembly by Garrett M. Fitzgerald (another Democrat).

== Personal life ==
Flynn's was among the nine Oak Creek immigrant families from Ireland who in 1839 began holding a Catholic service in his and other homes; this group eventually led to the creation of St. Matthew's Parish in that town.

At the time he took his place in the Assembly in January 1849, Flynn was reported as being 28 years old, a farmer from Ireland who had been in Wisconsin for twelve years.
