= Asa Kinney =

19th century American politician

Member of the Wisconsin Senate from the 18th district
- In office June 5, 1848 – January 7, 1850
- Preceded by: Position established
- Succeeded by: Duncan Reed

Member of the House of Representatives of the Wisconsin Territory from Milwaukee County
- In office February 7, 1848 – May 29, 1848 Serving with Isaac P. Walker & James Holliday
- Preceded by: William Shew, Andrew Sullivan, & William W. Brown
- Succeeded by: Position abolished

Personal details
- Born: May 21, 1810 Homer, New York, U.S.
- Died: October 3, 1886 (aged 76) Russell, Kansas, U.S.
- Resting place: Russell City Cemetery, Russell, Kansas
- Party: Democratic
- Spouses: Diana Spicer (m. 1830; died 1834); Lucretia Grinnel (m. 1835; died 1836); Delia Ann Rawson (m. 1837, divorced); Rachel Chinneth (m. 1878–1886)
- Children: Tyler Asa Kinney^{(b. 1831; died 1833)}; Alura (Stearns)^{(b. 1833; died 1910)}; Abel Frink Kinney^{(b. 1837; died 1890)}; Asa Tyler Kinney^{(b. 1839; died 1861)}; Electa R. Kinney^{(b. 1841; died 1926)}; Oliver Rawson Kinney^{(b. 1843; died 1875)}; Sarah Kinney^{(b. 1845; died 1845)}; Athelia Kinney^{(b. 1846; died 1846)}; Francis Loammi Kinney^{(b. 1847; died 1862)}; Martin Palmer Kinney^{(b. 1849; died 1928)}; Mary M. (Lewis)^{(b. 1851; died 1917)}; Charles J. Fremont Kinney^{(b. 1856; died 1913)}; John C. Kinney^{(b. 1859; died 1913)}

Military service
- Allegiance: United States
- Branch/service: United States Army; Union Army
- Rank: Quartermaster
- Unit: 4th Reg. Wis. Vol. Infantry; 1st Reg. Wis. Vol. Cavalry
- Battles/wars: American Civil War

Asa Kinney (May 21, 1810 – October 3, 1886) was an American businessman, politician, and Wisconsin pioneer. He represented southern Milwaukee County in the Wisconsin State Senate during the 1st and 2nd legislatures (1848, 1849).

== Biography ==
Born in Homer, New York, Kinney moved to Milwaukee, Wisconsin Territory, in 1836 and settled in Oak Creek where he had a farm. Kinney served in the first Wisconsin Constitutional Convention. Then, in 1847–1848, Kinney served in the Wisconsin Territorial Legislature in the Wisconsin Territorial House of Representatives. He served in the first Wisconsin State Senate in 1848-1849 as a Democrat. He moved to Plumas County, California to mine in 1852 and was elected as the first member of the California State Assembly from Plumas County in 1854, again as a Democrat. Kinney moved back to Wisconsin after the Assembly adjourned (without even going back to Plumas County) and settled in Ripon, Wisconsin. He served on the Ripon Common Council and was street commissioner. He also served as sergeant at arms in the Wisconsin Senate. In 1861, Kinney served as quartermaster in the 4th Wisconsin Infantry Regiment during the American Civil War. He was discharged because of health. He then enlisted in the 1st Wisconsin Volunteer Cavalry Regiment and was commissioned a lieutenant and assigned to quartermaster. He stayed in the regiment until the end of the Civil War. In 1871, Kinney moved with some colonists from Ripon, Wisconsin, to Kansas where they helped plat the community of Russell, Kansas. Kinney served as a local judge in Russell and was in the banking and insurance businesses in Kansas and Wisconsin. Kinney died in Russell, Kansas.

Wisconsin Senate
New state government	Member of the Wisconsin Senate from the 18th district June 5, 1848 – January 7, 1850	Succeeded by Duncan Reed
