= Charles Rickerson =

American politician

Charles Rickerson (1803 - ?) was a farmer from Medina, Wisconsin who served a single one-year term as a Democratic member of the Wisconsin State Assembly from Dane County for the 1849 session (2nd Wisconsin Legislature).

== Public office ==
On April 4, the first town meeting of the Town of Medina was held, and Rickerson was elected as a "school commissioner" (equivalent of a school board member).

At the time he took office in the Assembly in January 1849, he was described as 45 years old, a farmer from Rhode Island who had been in Wisconsin for five years. His district included the Towns of Cottage Grove, Sun Prairie and Windsor.

== Personal life ==
In 1849, he was one of the initial members of the newly-organized Wisconsin State Agricultural Society. He chaired the Dane County Democratic convention in August, and was a delegate to the Wisconsin state Democratic convention held in September.
