= Albert P. Blakeslee =

American politician

Albert P. Blakeslee was an American politician. He was a Democratic member of the Wisconsin State Assembly during the 1st Wisconsin Legislature's 1848 session. Blakeslee represented the 4th District of Rock County, Wisconsin. He was succeeded by Lucius H. Page, a Whig.
