= Charles Doty =

19th century Wisconsin politician and pioneer

5th Village President of Menasha, Wisconsin
- In office April 1861 – April 1862
- Preceded by: John A. Bryan
- Succeeded by: Eldredge D. Smith

Member of the Wisconsin State Assembly from the Fond du Lac 1st district
- In office June 5, 1848 – January 1, 1849
- Preceded by: Position established
- Succeeded by: Morgan Noble

Personal details
- Born: August 17, 1824 Green Bay, Michigan Territory, U.S.
- Died: December 17, 1918 (aged 94) Bay County, Florida, U.S.
- Resting place: Greenwood Cemetery, Panama City, Florida
- Party: Whig (before 1854)
- Spouse: Sarah Jane Webster (m. 1846; died 1893)
- Children: Webster Doty^{(b. 1847; died 1924)}; Edmond Doty^{(b. 1852; died 1887)}
- Parent: James Duane Doty (father)

Military service
- Allegiance: United States
- Branch/service: United States Volunteers (Union Army)
- Years of service: 1863–1865
- Rank: Captain, USV; Brevet Lt. Colonel, USV
- Unit: Commissary of Subsistence
- Battles/wars: American Civil War

Charles Doty (August 17, 1824 – December 17, 1918) was an American surveyor, politician, and Wisconsin pioneer. He was one of the first American children born in what is now Wisconsin, and served in the 1st Wisconsin Legislature, representing Fond du Lac County. His father was Wisconsin Territory governor James Duane Doty.

== Biography ==
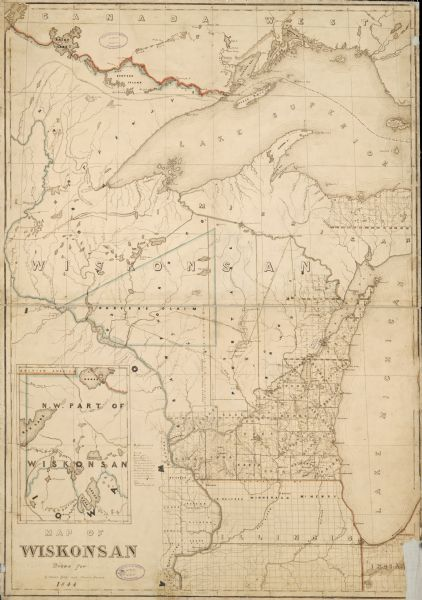
Map of Wisconsin created by Charles Doty in 1844

Doty was born in what is now Green Bay, Wisconsin, on August 17, 1824. At the time of his birth, the area was known as "Shanty Town" and was still part of the Michigan Territory. He was a descendant of Mayflower colonist Edward Doty. He was trained to be a civil engineer and surveyor in Derry, New Hampshire. He was the son of Wisconsin territorial governor James Duane Doty and served as his father's private secretary. Doty married Sarah Jane Webster in 1846, and they had three sons. He served in the United States Army during the Civil War. After the war, Doty took inventory of supplies for the Native Americans and eventually retired to St. Andrews in Bay County, Florida, where he died.

In 1848, he served in the 1st Wisconsin Legislature as a Whig member of the Wisconsin State Assembly.

Wisconsin State Assembly
| New state government | Member of the Wisconsin State Assembly from the Fond du Lac 1st district June 5, 1848 – January 1, 1849 | Succeeded by Morgan Noble |
