= William H. Thomas (Wisconsin politician) =

19th century American politician

District Attorney of Waukesha County, Wisconsin
- In office January 5, 1880 – January 3, 1887
- Preceded by: Alexander Cook
- Succeeded by: E. D. R. Thompson

Member of the Wisconsin State Assembly
- In office January 7, 1861 – January 6, 1862
- Preceded by: William R. Hesk
- Succeeded by: Samuel Thompson
- Constituency: Waukesha 2nd district
- In office January 1, 1849 – January 7, 1850
- Preceded by: Joseph W. Brackett
- Succeeded by: Patrick Higgins
- Constituency: Waukesha 1st district

Member of the House of Representatives of the Wisconsin Territory for Milwaukee & Washington counties
- In office January 5, 1846 – January 4, 1847 Serving with Benjamin H. Mooers, Samuel H. Barstow, John Crawford, James Magone, & Luther Parker
- Preceded by: George H. Walker, Charles E. Brown, Pitts Ellis, Byron Kilbourn, Benjamin H. Mooers, & William Shew
- Succeeded by: District abolished

Personal details
- Born: September 25, 1821 Clinton County, New York, U.S.
- Died: December 26, 1898 (aged 77) Pewaukee, Wisconsin, U.S.
- Resting place: Forest Hill Cemetery, Pewaukee, Wisconsin
- Party: Democratic
- Spouse: married 3 times
- Children: at least 12

Military service
- Allegiance: United States
- Branch/service: United States Volunteers; Union Army
- Years of service: 1861–1864
- Rank: Captain, USV
- Unit: 3rd Reg. Wis. Vol. Cavalry
- Battles/wars: American Civil War

William H. Thomas (September 25, 1821 – December 26, 1898) was an American lawyer, Democratic politician, and Wisconsin pioneer. He served two terms in the Wisconsin State Assembly, representing Waukesha County, and served as a Union Army cavalry officer during the American Civil War.

== Biography ==
Thomas was born on September 25, 1821, in Clinton County, New York, and received a liberal education. He came to the Wisconsin Territory as a young man, in 1838, and settled a large farm in the town of Lisbon, in what is now Waukesha County, Wisconsin.

He became active with the Democratic Party of Wisconsin and was elected to the 4th Wisconsin Territorial Assembly, representing Milwaukee and Washington counties—Milwaukee County at that time comprised all of the territory which is now Waukesha County. After Wisconsin achieved statehood, Thomas was elected to the Wisconsin State Assembly for the 2nd Wisconsin Legislature, representing northeastern Waukesha County. He was elected to another term in 1860, serving in the 14th Wisconsin Legislature.

The American Civil War began during his second term in the Wisconsin State Assembly. After the legislative term, he enrolled as a volunteer for service with the Union Army and was enlisted as a private in the Company D of the 3rd Wisconsin Cavalry Regiment. Shortly after the regiment was organized, Thomas was commissioned as adjutant for the regiment's 1st battalion. He served in that role until October 1862, when he was commissioned captain of Company H. He served through most of the war and resigned in September 1864. The 3rd Wisconsin Cavalry served primarily in the Trans-Mississippi theater of the war, engaged in suppression of guerilla activity in Kansas, Missouri, and Arkansas.

After the war, he moved to Waukesha, Wisconsin, and subsequently moved to Pewaukee, Wisconsin, where he had an active and successful legal practice. He was elected district attorney of Waukesha County in 1879 and was re-elected in 1881 and 1884, serving seven consecutive years in the office.

Thomas was a political ally of Edward S. Bragg, and was described as Bragg's right-hand man during the contentious 1882 Democratic 2nd congressional district convention. Bragg engaged in a bitter feud through the convention with Arthur Delaney over the congressional nomination. After 1600 ballots were taken, neither man received the nomination.

William H. Thomas died on December 26, 1898, at his home in Pewaukee.

== Personal life and family ==
William H. Thomas married three times. He divorced his first wife and was widowed twice. He had at least twelve children, though several died in childhood.

Wisconsin State Assembly
Preceded by Joseph W. Brackett	Member of the Wisconsin State Assembly from the Waukesha 1st district January 1, 1849 – January 7, 1850	Succeeded by Patrick Higgins
Preceded by William R. Hesk	Member of the Wisconsin State Assembly from the Waukesha 2nd district January 7, 1861 – January 6, 1862	Succeeded by Samuel Thompson
Legal offices
Preceded by Alexander Cook	District Attorney of Waukesha County, Wisconsin; January 5, 1880 – January 3, 1887	Succeeded by E. D. R. Thompson
