= Garrett M. Fitzgerald =

American politician

Garrett M. Fitzgerald (May 21, 1806 – September 24, 1859) was an American politician.

Born in Killarney, Ireland, he emigrated with his family to New York City. In 1841, he moved to Milwaukee County, Wisconsin Territory. He was a deputy sheriff and county treasurer. He served in the Wisconsin Constitutional Conventions of 1846 and 1847–1848. He served in the Wisconsin State Assembly, in 1850, as a Democrat, succeeding John Flynn, Jr. (also a Democrat). He died near Milwaukee, Wisconsin.
