= 37th Illinois Infantry Regiment =

37th Illinois Volunteer Infantry Regiment "Fremont Rifles"
- Illinois state flag
- Active: September 18, 1861, to May 15, 1866
- Country: United States
- Allegiance: Union
- Branch: Infantry
- Size: 964 Enlisted and 30 Officers
- Nickname: "Fremont Rifles" / "Illinois Greyhounds"
- Equipment: Springfield Model 1861 (8 Companies); Colt's New Model revolving rifle (Two Companies, including all NCOs)
- Engagements: Battle of Pea Ridge; Battle of Prairie Grove; Siege of Vicksburg; Battle of Cape Girardeau; Battle of Chalk Bluff; Battle of Spanish Fort; Battle of Fort Blakeley

The 37th Illinois Volunteer Infantry Regiment, nicknamed the "Fremont Rifles" and "Illinois Greyhounds", was an infantry regiment that served in the Union Army during the American Civil War. Distinguished by its high mobility and advanced weaponry, the regiment participated in every major campaign of the Trans-Mississippi and Gulf, from early battles in Missouri to the post-war occupation of Texas.

== Organization ==
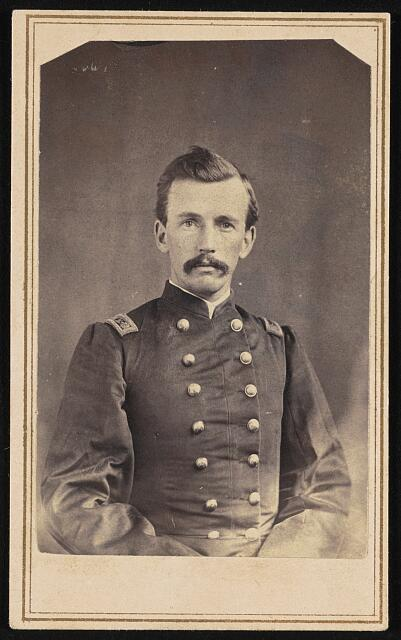
Major Charles W. Hawes of Co. A, A. D. Lytle, Baton Rouge, LA

The 37th Illinois Infantry was organized at Chicago, Illinois, and mustered into Federal service on September 18, 1861, for 3 Year Service. The regiment was uniquely armed: eight companies were equipped with Springfield Model 1861 rifles, while two companies and their NCOs were equipped with Colt's New Model Revolving Rifles, providing the unit with superior firepower. The companies, their primary location of recruitment, and their captain are as follows:

Company	Primary Location of Recruitment	Captains
A	Rock Island & Mercer County	Henry Jr Curtis Charles W. Hawes
B	Stark & Henry Counties	Charles V. Dickenson Francis A. Jones
C	Lake County	Judson Huntly Eugene Payne
D	Cook County & Michigan	John W. Laimbeer John Morand
E	LaSalle County	James P. Day Phineas B. Rust
F	Lake County	Gallio H. Fairman Erwin B. Messer
G	Cook and Mclean Counties	George R. Bell Erasmus M. Conover
H	Rock Island County	John B. Frick George H. Merrill
I	Boone County	Ransom Kennicott George Kennicott
K	Vermillion County	William P. Black Thomas Chapman

Before Departure, the regiment received battle flags from the Chicago Board of Trade in St. Louis. Mrs. Jessie Benton Fremont personally tied the ribbons to the spearhead of the regimental flag. One was a National flag while the other was a blue regimental flag bearing a portrait of John C. Fremont.

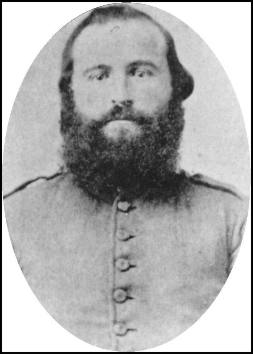
Confederate General McIntosh was killed on the front lines.

== Service ==
=== Early service ===
On October 2, the regiment moved to Booneville, Missouri, where it was stationed until October 10, when it moved to Arrow Rock via the USS War Eagle, and after scouting Saline County to search for Confederate General Claib Jackson, the regiment returned to Arrow Head, where Captain Payne took command of the post in Booneville, with Companies C and D, alongside seven companies of the Missouri Home Guard. Colonel White, with 8 remaining companies, was attached to the Army of the Frontier and skirmished with Price's retreating Confederates at Sugar Creek, Arkansas, and would participate in the Battle of Pea Ridge. During the battle, it was a part of the 2nd Brigade (Commanded by Col. Julius White), 3rd Division (Commanded by Jefferson C. Davis)

=== Battle of Elkhorn Tavern / Pea Ridge ===
At the Battle of Pea Ridge, the 37th Illinois played a crucial role in the Union victory by repelling a Confederate attack that outnumbered them. The brigade repulsed the attacks by General McIntosh and McCullough, who were killed.

Although the regiment sustained 135 casualties, including a severe arm wound to John C. Black, they maintained their position through two days of combat, eventually joining the final bayonet charge that drove Sterling Price's Army, securing a victory for the Union. Colonel Julius White was promoted to Brigadier General for his Gallantry.

=== Battle of Prairie Grove ===
In December 1862, the regiment performed a forced march to relieve General Blunt, covering 112 miles in three days, double-quicking the final 10 miles, to take part in the Battle of Prairie Grove. During the engagement, the regiment fought its way to Borden and captured a Confederate artillery battery on the way. During the battle, John C. Black, who already had a wound to the arm during Pea Ridge, was subsequently hit in the other arm. Both he and his brother, William P. Black, would receive the Medal of Honor for their heroism in the battle.

=== Battle of Vicksburg ===
In 1863, the 37th Illinois took part in the Siege of Vicksburg, occupying a crucial position on the south side of the city near the river. Following the city's surrender on July 4th, the regiment participated in the capture of Yazoo City and Operations in Louisiana.

The regiment was later sent to the Rio Grande to guard the Texas border at Brownsville. In February 1864, the men re-enlisted as veterans. During the Red River Campaign, the unit gained fame for constructing a "Steamboat Ridge" over the Atchafalaya Bayou, allowing Nathaniel P. Banks's army to escape from Confederate Pursuit.

=== Mobile Campaign ===
In early 1865, the 37th Illinois joined the campaign against Mobile, Alabama. On April 1865, the same day Robert E. Lee surrendered at Appomattox, the regiment participated in the Battle of Fort Blakeley. Charging against the Confederate fort alongside the 20th Iowa, under heavy fire. After the hard-fought charge, they captured the Fort and 1,200 prisoners.

Following the fall of Mobile, the regiment moved to Montgomery and Selma before being ordered to Texas for occupation duty. Stationed at Houston, the regiment's companies were scattered across various railroad hubs to maintain order.

== Disbanding ==
The regiment was mustered out on August 15, 1865, but it did not reach Springfield, Illinois, for final discharge until May 31st, 1866.

== Total strength and casualties ==
The regiment suffered 7 officers and 91 enlisted men who were killed in action or who died of their wounds ad 5 officers and 164 enlisted men who died of disease, for a total of 267 fatalities.

== Commanders ==
- Colonel Julius White – mustered on September 18, 1861; promoted to brigadier general on June 9, 1862.
- Colonel Myron S. Barnes – dismissed on disability on November 20, 1862.
- Colonel John C. Black – resigned August 15, 1866 (as brigadier general).
- Colonel Ransom Kennicott – mustered out with the regiment (as lieutenant colonel).

== See also ==
- List of Illinois Civil War Units
- Illinois in the American Civil War
