= Davis Gillilan =

American politician

Davis Gillilan or Gillilian (March 17, 1812 - August 8, 1852) was an American merchant, miner and politician from Dubuque, Wisconsin Territory and Potosi, Wisconsin, who held various elected offices in Dubuque and served a single one-year term as a Democratic member of the Wisconsin State Assembly from Grant County.

== Background ==
Gillilan was born May 17, 1812, in Greenbrier County in what was then Virginia (now part of West Virginia. In 1832 after the Blackhawk War he came to the mining district of Dubuque in what was then Michigan Territory, the first year settlers were allowed to cross the Mississippi River into what now is Iowa. Gillilan became a merchant in the dry goods business, also selling groceries and hardware. On July 2, 1836, he married Mary Krisier or Kreiser (sources vary); in the marriage announcement it is mentioned that he was the former sheriff of Dubuque County. Dubuque County became part of the new Wisconsin Territory in 1836.

== Leaving Iowa ==
The Gillilans moved to the mining district of Potosi in Wisconsin Territory in 1841, and Davis became a miner. In December 1846 he was a leader of a group of mineral rights claimants who met in British Hollow and organized a vigilance committee to assert squatters' rights over lands in the region which were to be sold by the United States General Land Office in May 1847 "without respect to claims or to settlers, leaving it for speculators to bid off our claims and property which have cost us the labor of years."

After Wisconsin statehood, Davis was elected to the Wisconsin State Assembly in 1848 for the 1849 (2nd Wisconsin Legislature) session, succeeding Whig Armisted C. Brown. By the time he took office in the Assembly (January 1849) he was described as 38 years old, a miner from Virginia, who had been in Wisconsin for six years. He was assigned to the standing committees on corporations and on mining and smelting. He would be succeeded in the 1850 session by Jeremiah E. Dodge, a Democrat.

== Personal life ==
He and Mary Kreiser (a native of Ohio) would eventually have seven children. He died April 8, 1852, in Potosi of cholera (the 1846–1860 cholera pandemic hit Potosi particularly hard), and is buried in the British Hollow Cemetery in Grant County. Mary would live until June 3, 1888.
