= Hugh McFarlane =

19th century American politician

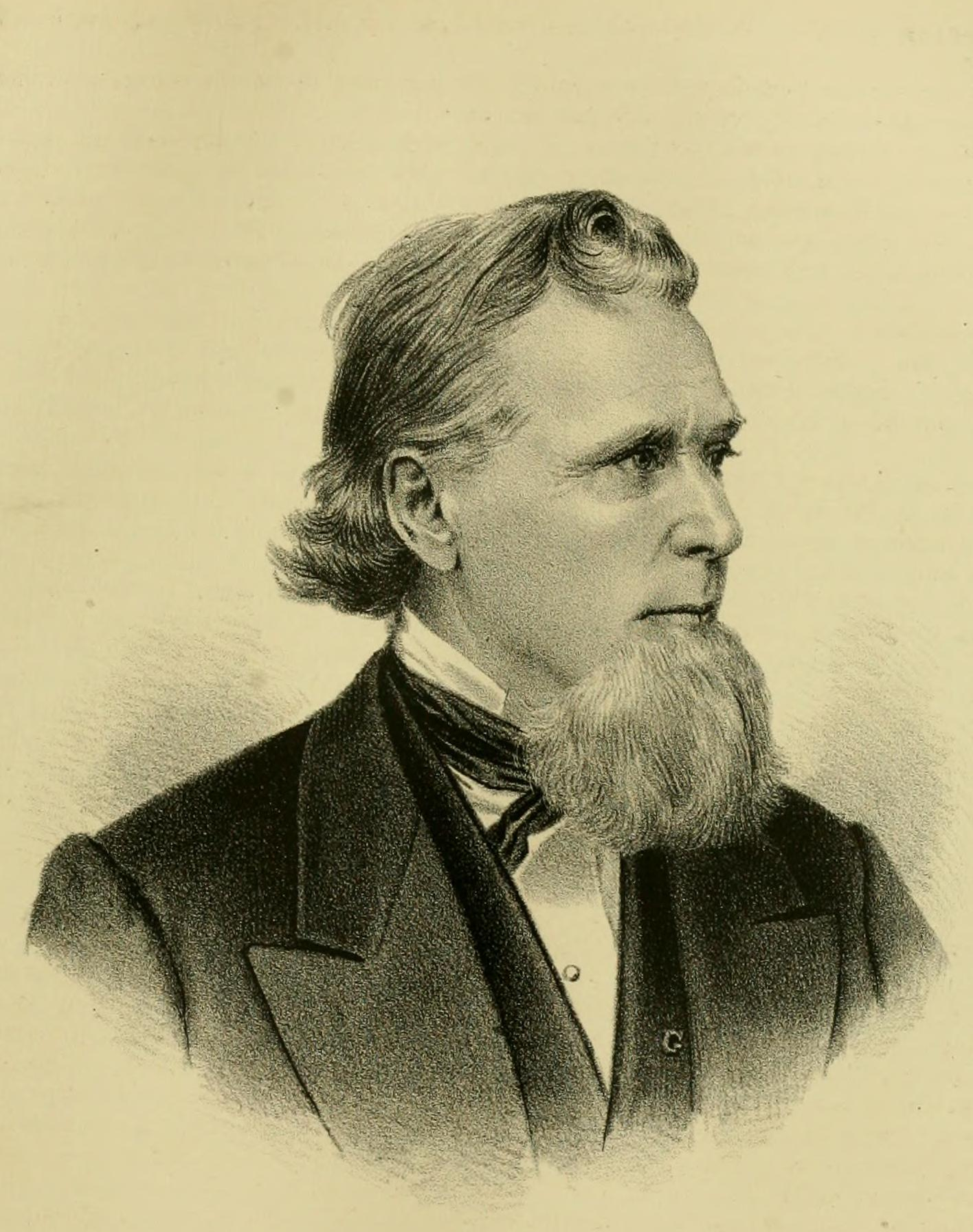
- Portrait from The History of Columbia County, Wisconsin (1880)

Member of the Wisconsin State Assembly from the Columbia district
- In office January 7, 1850 – January 6, 1851
- Preceded by: Joseph Kerr
- Succeeded by: William T. Bradley

Member of the House of Representatives of the Wisconsin Territory for Brown, Calumet, Columbia, Fond du Lac, Manitowoc, Marquette, Portage, and Winnebago counties
- In office January 4, 1847 – October 18, 1847 Serving with Elisha Morrow
- Preceded by: Mason C. Darling, Abraham Brawley, & Elisha Morrow
- Succeeded by: George W. Featherstonhaugh & Moses S. Gibson

Personal details
- Born: June 23, 1815 County Tyrone, Ireland, UK
- Died: August 16, 1882 (aged 67) Arlington, Wisconsin, U.S.
- Resting place: Silver Lake Cemetery, Portage, Wisconsin
- Party: Democratic
- Spouse: Sarah Dunn (died 1862)
- Children: Mary Ann (Williams)^{(b. 1836; died 1925)}; Letticia J. McFarlane^{(b. 1837; died 1846)}; Andrew J. McFarlane^{(b. 1840; died 1863)}; James McFarlane^{(b. 1842; died 1843)}; Syrus McFarlane^{(b. 1850; died 1852)}; Clara (Gerstenkorn)^{(b. 1864; died 1934)}

Hugh McFarlane (June 23, 1815 – August 16, 1882) was an Irish American immigrant, businessman, and Democratic politician. He represented Columbia County in the Wisconsin State Assembly during the 1850 session. Before Wisconsin achieved statehood, he served in the House of Representatives in the 5th Wisconsin Territorial Assembly.

== Biography ==
Born in County Tyrone, Ireland, McFarlane emigrated to the United States and moved to Mineral Point, Michigan Territory, in 1835. In 1843, he settled permanently in the area that would become Portage, Wisconsin, and was in the lumber and merchandise business. McFarlane served in the Wisconsin Territorial House of Representatives in 1847. and the Wisconsin State Assembly in 1850. He was a Democrat. In 1859, he moved to a farm in Arlington, Wisconsin and was chairman of the Arlington Town Board. He also served as a commissioner of the Wisconsin Farm Mortgage Company. McFarlane died in Arlington, Wisconsin.

== Personal life and family ==
Hugh McFarlane and his wife Sarah (née Dunn) had at least six children, though three died in childhood. Their only son, Andrew J. McFarlane, served as a first lieutenant in the 23rd Wisconsin Infantry Regiment during the American Civil War. He died from wounds received at the Siege of Vicksburg.

Wisconsin State Assembly
| Preceded by Joseph Kerr | Member of the Wisconsin State Assembly from the Columbia district January 7, 1850 – January 6, 1851 | Succeeded by William T. Bradley |
