= William Hill (Wisconsin politician) =

American politician

William Hill (c. 1811 - ?) was an American miner from New Diggings, Wisconsin who served a single one-year term as a Democratic member of the Wisconsin State Assembly during the 1849 session (the 2nd Wisconsin Legislature). At the time he took office in January 1849, he was reported to be 37 years old, a miner from Ohio, and to have been in Wisconsin thirteen years.
