= Julius White =

American businessman and Civil War general (1816–1890)

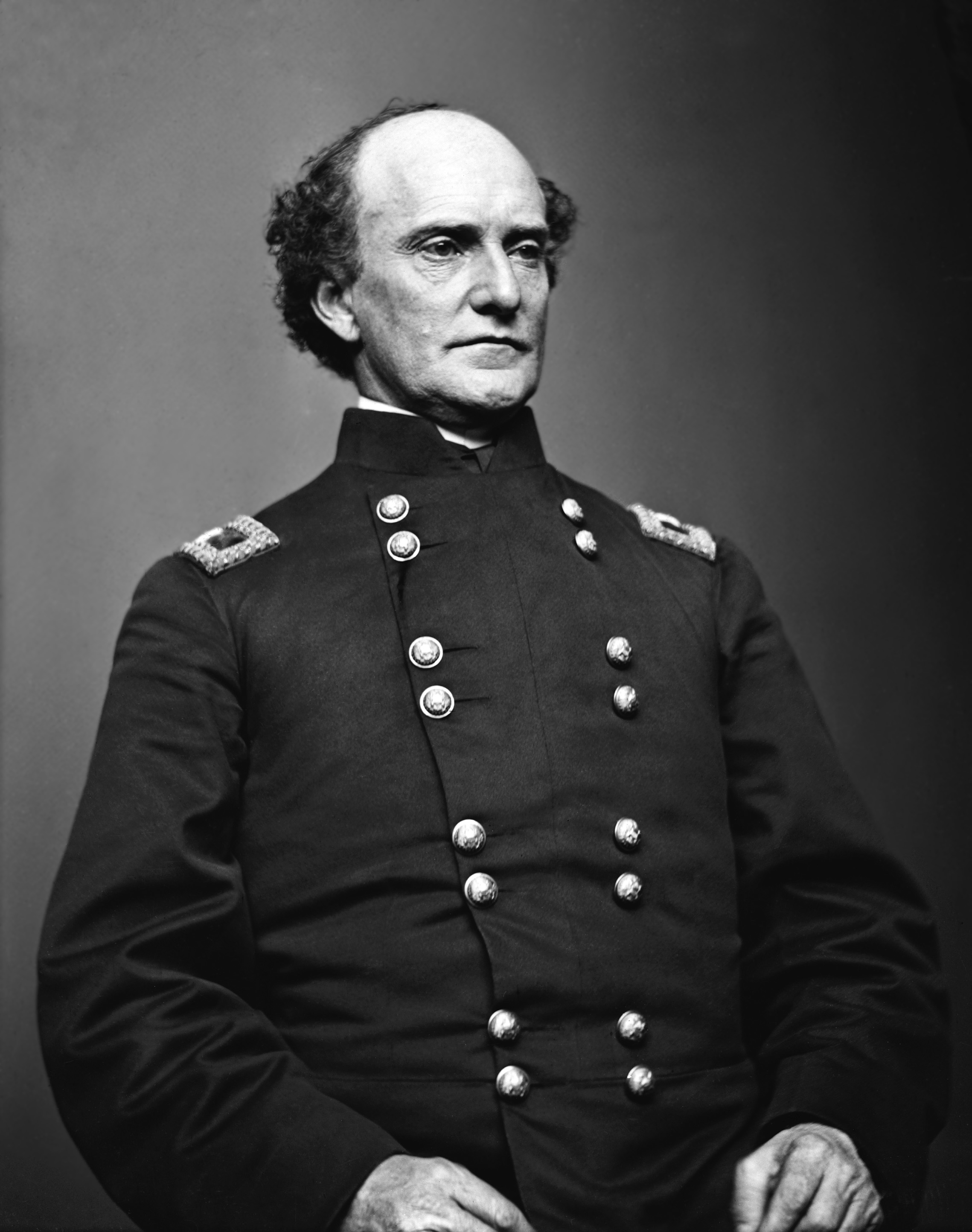

10th United States Minister to Argentina
- In office June 5, 1868 – July 8, 1869
- President: Andrew Johnson; Ulysses S. Grant
- Preceded by: Robert C. Kirk
- Succeeded by: Thomas O. Osborn

Chairman of the Cook County Board of Commissioners
- In office December 4, 1871 – December 1872
- Preceded by: office established
- Succeeded by: Henry B. Miller

Member of the Wisconsin State Assembly from the Milwaukee 3rd district
- In office January 1, 1849 – January 7, 1850
- Preceded by: William W. Brown
- Succeeded by: Edward McGarry

Personal details
- Born: September 23, 1816 Cazenovia, New York, U.S.
- Died: May 12, 1890 (aged 73) Evanston, Illinois, U.S.
- Resting place: Rosehill Cemetery, Chicago, Illinois
- Party: Republican; Whig (before 1854)
- Spouse: Catherine Frances Collins (died 1892)
- Children: Edward Macon White^{(b. 1841; died 1873)}; Mildred (Roanne)^{(b. 1846; died 1881)}; Fremont White^{(b. 1850; died 1851)}; Lizzie Ruggles (Sullivan)^{(b. 1852; died 1917)}; Henry Teneyck White^{(b. 1853; died 1942)}

Military service
- Allegiance: United States
- Branch/service: United States Army; Union Army
- Years of service: 1861–1865
- Rank: Brig. General; Brevet Major General
- Commands: 37th Reg. Ill. Vol. Infantry; 2nd Div., XXIII Corps; 1st Div., IX Corps
- Battles/wars: American Civil War; Battle of Pea Ridge; Battle of Harpers Ferry; Battle of Campbell's Station; Siege of Knoxville; Battle of the Crater; Battle of Globe Tavern

Julius White (September 23, 1816 – May 12, 1890) was an American businessman and brigadier general in the Union Army during the American Civil War. After the war, he served as U.S. Minister (ambassador) to Argentina.

== Early life and career ==
Born September 23, 1816, in Cazenovia, New York, White left New York at the age of twenty for Chicago, Illinois, where he took up various business pursuits. He later moved to Milwaukee, Wisconsin, to pursue commercial business there, including as an insurance agent. He was elected in 1848 to the 2nd Wisconsin Legislature as a Whig member of the Wisconsin State Assembly, serving a single one-year term. Soon after that, he returned to the Chicago area, where he became a prominent insurance agent and underwriter, becoming president of the Chicago Board of Underwriters and a member of the Chicago Board of Trade. During the Presidential election of 1860, White invited Abraham Lincoln (a former fellow Whig and described in contemporary accounts as an "old friend" of Lincoln) to visit him in his newly-purchased home in Evanston in April, where he was entertained, feted and is described as enjoying himself before staying overnight.

On March 30, 1861, now-President Lincoln appointed White customs collector for the Port of Chicago.

== Civil War ==
White resigned his post in Customs when he received a commission as colonel of the 37th Illinois Volunteer Infantry Regiment on September 19, 1861. He led the regiment in the southwest Missouri campaign of John C. Fremont in late 1861. At the Battle of Pea Ridge on March 7, 1862, his brigade of two Illinois regiments blunted the attack of Louis Hebert's Confederates. On March 8, his troops participated in the final attack that defeated the Southern army.

White was promoted brigadier general on June 9, 1862, and led the "Railroad" Brigade, VIII Corps. During the Second Battle of Bull Run, this unit was posted in Martinsburg, West Virginia, on the Baltimore & Ohio Railroad. In the face of Robert E. Lee's invasion of Maryland, White retreated into Harper's Ferry, West Virginia, and joined Colonel Dixon S. Miles and his large garrison there. "White outranked Miles, but he followed military protocol by putting himself under the officer commanding on the scene in a crisis." This was an unfortunate decision for White because Miles proved to be incapable of mounting an effective defense of the position. The Battle of Harpers Ferry was fought September 12–15, 1862, from a highly disadvantageous position compounded by Miles's numerous strategic mistakes. After he ran up the white flag, one of the last shots mortally wounded Miles. Therefore, White had to carry out the formal surrender of the place. For surrendering, White was brought before a court of inquiry, but he was acquitted when the court "found that he acted with capability and courage."

White was assigned to the XXIII Corps where he commanded the 2nd Division in the Knoxville Campaign in 1863. In July 1864, he was sent to the Eastern Theater to command a division in the IX Corps. He briefly served as Ambrose Burnside's chief of staff during the battle of the Crater. He commanded the 1st Division in the IX Corps at the battle of Globe Tavern. This division was discontinued late in the Summer of 1864 and White resigned on November 19, 1864. He was breveted major general for war service.

== Postbellum career ==
White returned to the insurance industry after the war. In 1871, when Cook County adopted a new form of government by a Cook County Board of Commissioners, White was not only elected to the board from one of the non-Chicago districts, but was elected its first chairman, even though ten of the fifteen commissioners were from Chicago.

In 1872, White left the insurance business and went into real estate. He was one of the founding members of First Congregational Church of Evanston in 1869.

White served as U.S. Minister to Argentina from November 1873 to March 1874.

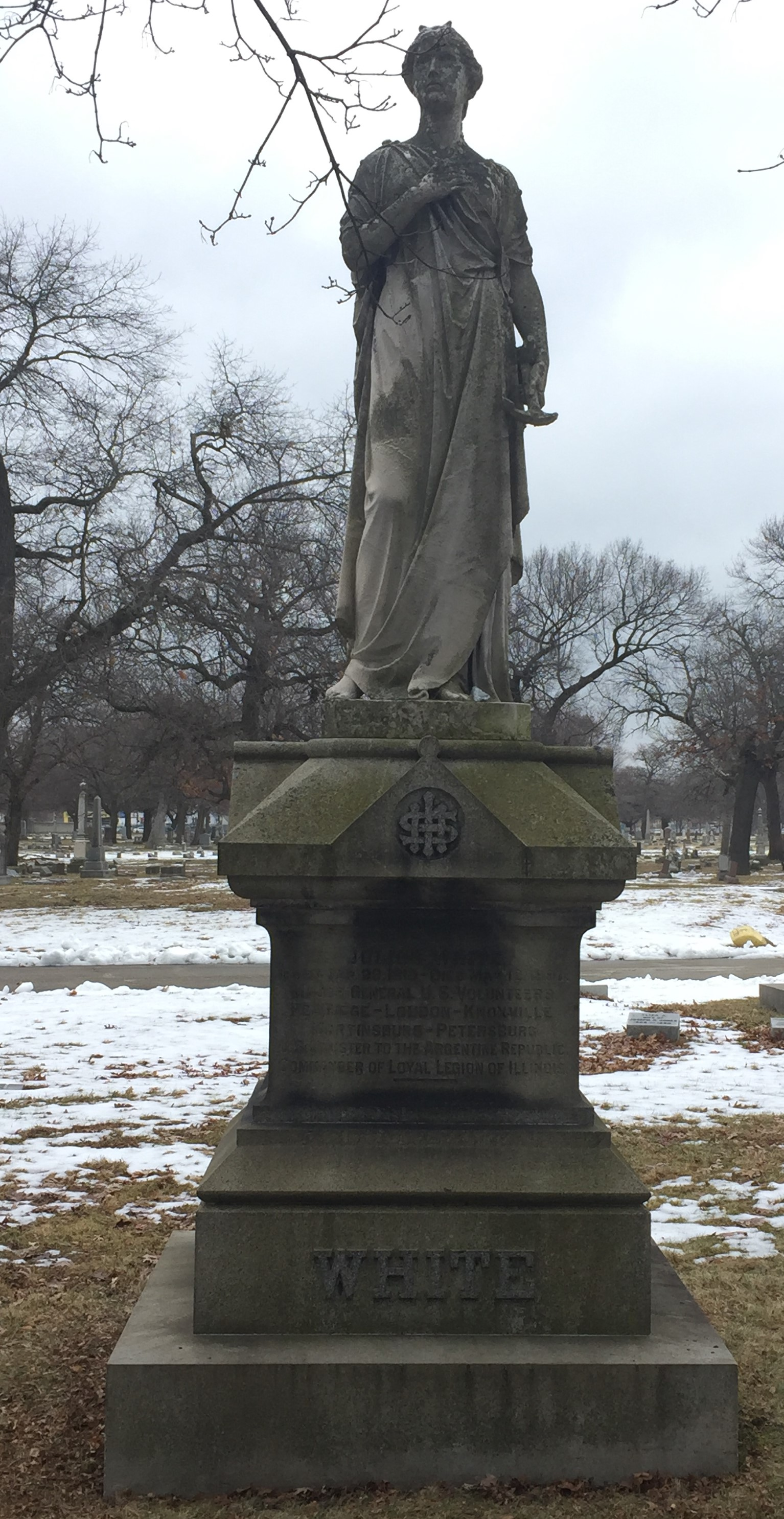
Julius White's grave at Rosehill Cemetery, Chicago

He died May 12, 1890, in Evanston, and is buried at Rosehill Cemetery in Chicago.

Locust Street in Chicago's Loop was formerly named White Street after White.

== See also ==
- List of American Civil War generals (Union)

== Footnotes ==
Military offices
Regiment established	Command of the 37th Illinois Infantry Regiment; September 18, 1861 – June 9, 1862	Succeeded by Col. Myron S. Barnes
Wisconsin State Assembly
Preceded by William W. Brown	Member of the Wisconsin State Assembly from the Milwaukee 3rd district January 1, 1849 – January 7, 1850	Succeeded by Edward McGarry
Diplomatic posts
Preceded by Robert C. Kirk	United States Minister to Argentina; June 5, 1868 – July 8, 1869	Succeeded by Thomas O. Osborn
