= Lucius H. Page =

American politician

Lucius Hubbard Page was an American politician from Fulton, Wisconsin who served a single one-year term in the 1849 term of the Wisconsin State Assembly, representing the 2nd Rock County district (the towns of Magnolia, Union, Porter and Fulton). He was a Whig. He had succeeded Democrat Albert P. Blakeslee, and would be succeeded in turn by fellow Whig John R. Briggs.

In 1847, the Territorial Legislature had appointed Page and two colleagues as commissioners to lay out a territorial road from Janesville to Fort Winnebago.
