= Joseph Kerr (Wisconsin politician) =

American farmer and politician (1804–1855)

Member of the Wisconsin State Assembly from the Columbia district
- In office June 5, 1848 – January 7, 1850
- Preceded by: Position established
- Succeeded by: Hugh McFarlane

Personal details
- Born: 1804 Ohio, U.S.
- Died: January 22, 1855 (aged 50–51) Randolph, Wisconsin, U.S.
- Resting place: Friesland Cemetery, Friesland, Wisconsin
- Party: Whig
- Spouse: Lydia H. Langdon (died 1884)
- Children: Samuel Kerr; (b. 1846; died 1919)

Joseph Kerr (1804 – January 22, 1855) was an American farmer, Whig politician, and Wisconsin pioneer. He represented Columbia County in the Wisconsin State Assembly during the 1st and 2nd legislatures (1848, 1849).

== Background and election to the Assembly ==
He was born in Ohio shortly after the state's admission to the Union, and arrived in Columbia County in the fall of 1846. When Wisconsin achieved statehood, he was elected to the Assembly's Columbia County seat as a Whig, and was re-elected in the fall of 1848 for the following year. When in April 1849 Randolph was organized as a Town, he was the (unsuccessful) Whig candidate for chairman of the town board. He was succeeded in the Assembly seat for 1850 by Hugh McFarlane of Portage.

== After the Assembly ==
In November 1851 he was a founding member, and was elected First Vice-president, of the Columbia County Agricultural Society. He remained active therein, and in November 1853 was elected President of the Society.

He died January 22, 1855, in Randolph. At the time of his death he had been for years Chairman of the Town of Randolph Board of Supervisors, and thrice been elected Chairman of the Columbia County Board; and was a Director of the La Crosse & Milwaukee Railroad Company. He was married, and was or had been a parent.

Wisconsin State Assembly
| New state government | Member of the Wisconsin State Assembly from the Columbia district June 5, 1848 – January 7, 1850 | Succeeded by Hugh McFarlane |
