= Byron Kilbourn =

American politician (1801–1870)

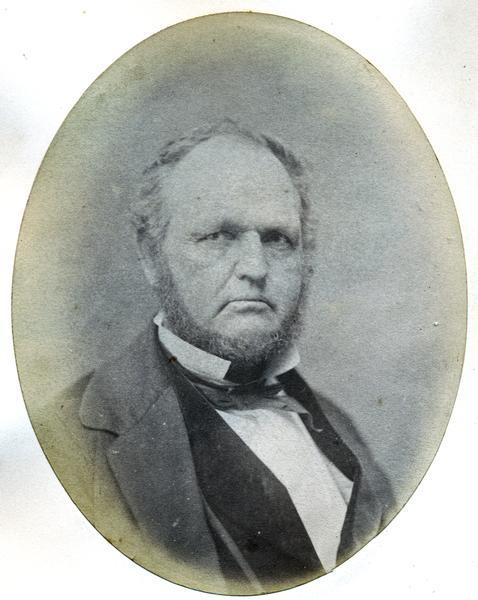
- Photo from the Wisconsin Historical Society

3rd & 8th Mayor of Milwaukee
- In office April 1854 – April 1855
- Preceded by: George H. Walker
- Succeeded by: James B. Cross
- In office April 1848 – April 1849
- Preceded by: Horatio Wells
- Succeeded by: Don A. J. Upham

Member of the House of Representatives of the Wisconsin Territory for Milwaukee and Washington counties
- In office January 6, 1845 – January 5, 1846 Serving with George H. Walker, Charles E. Brown, Pitts Ellis, Benjamin H. Mooers, and William Shew
- Preceded by: Andrew E. Elmore, Benjamin Hunkins, Thomas H. Olin, Jonathan Parsons, and Jared Thompson
- Succeeded by: Samuel H. Barstow, John Crawford, James Magone, Luther Parker, and William H. Thomas

Personal details
- Born: September 8, 1801 Granby, Connecticut, U.S.
- Died: December 16, 1870 (aged 69) Jacksonville, Florida, U.S.
- Resting place: Forest Home Cemetery, Milwaukee, Wisconsin
- Party: Democratic
- Spouses: Mary Henrietta Cowles (m. 1827; died 1837); Henrietta Karrick (m. 1838–1870)
- Children: 3 with Mary Cowles; Gloriana Kilbourn^{(b. 1825; died 1845)}; Lucy Fitch Kilbourn^{(b. 1830; died 1842)}; Byron Kilbourn Jr.^{(b. 1832; died 1897)}; 2 with Henrietta Karrick; Byron Hector Kilbourn^{(b. 1840; died 1897)}; John Fitch Kilbourn^{(b. 1845; died 1850)}
- Parents: James Kilbourne (father); Lucy (Fitch) Kilbourne (mother)
- Occupation: Businessman, politician

Byron Kilbourn (September 8, 1801 – December 16, 1870) was an American surveyor, railroad executive, politician, and Wisconsin pioneer. He was one of the founders of Milwaukee, Wisconsin, having established one of the three original settlements later incorporated into the city of Milwaukee; his settlement was known as "Kilbourntown" and was located on the west side of the Milwaukee River. He was also instrumental in the founding of the settlement that became the city of West Bend, Wisconsin.

He later served as the 3rd and 8th mayor of Milwaukee (1848, 1854), and represented Milwaukee County at Wisconsin's second constitutional convention, which drafted the Constitution of Wisconsin in the winter of 1847–1848.

During these years, he was also a significant investor and promoter of railroads, and was president of the Milwaukee & Mississippi Railroad until he was fired by the board amid allegations of fraud and mismanagement. He then chartered the La Crosse & Milwaukee Railroad to compete with his former business in building a railroad line to connect Milwaukee to the Mississippi River. In his work on the La Crosse & Milwaukee railroad, he was largely responsible for the consequential decision to locate a railroad bridge over the Wisconsin River at what is now Wisconsin Dells, Wisconsin—the village there was originally named "Kilbourn City".

Kilbourn was ruined by scandal when it was revealed in 1857 that he orchestrated one of the worst corruption scandals in Wisconsin history to acquire land grants for railroad routes; in subsequent investigations, dozens of Wisconsin legislators and other state officials were found to have taken bribes, with allegations tainting nearly every member of the 9th Wisconsin Legislature.

Byron Kilbourn's father, James Kilbourne, was the founder of Worthington, Ohio, and served two terms in the U.S. House of Representatives.

== Biography ==
Kilbourn was born in Granby, Connecticut. In 1803, he moved with his family to Worthington, Ohio, which his father had helped found that year. Kilbourn's father was James Kilbourne, a colonel during the War of 1812 and a U.S. Representative from Ohio from 1813 to 1817.

Byron Kilbourn worked in Ohio as a surveyor and as a state engineer. He first visited the land that is now Wisconsin in 1834; he initially arrived at Green Bay and worked as a government surveyor in the area. He later deemed the area near the Milwaukee River to be a promising location for commerce, and he purchased land there. In 1837, Kilbourn founded Kilbourntown (present-day Westown), which rivaled with Solomon Juneau's Juneautown (present-day East Town) and George Walker's Walker's Point. He was a key figure in the Milwaukee Bridge War in 1845. In 1846, the three combined and formed the city of Milwaukee, Wisconsin. He served in the Wisconsin Territorial House of Representatives in 1845 and was a member of the second Wisconsin Constitutional Convention of 1847. Kilbourn also served as a Milwaukee alderman and was elected to two non-consecutive terms as mayor in 1848 and 1854. Kilbourn was also an 1849 candidate for the United States Senate, but was defeated by incumbent Isaac P. Walker.

When working as a highway commissioner for the Wisconsin Territorial Legislature, Kilbourn founded what was to become the City of West Bend in 1845. In 1857, Kilbourn founded the city of Kilbourn City, now known as the city of Wisconsin Dells.

Kilbourn became involved in the railroad industry, serving as president of the Milwaukee and Mississippi Railroad for about three years from around 1849 until 1852. He was fired by the railroad's board of directors following allegations of mismanagement and fraud. He then started a new railroad from Milwaukee to La Crosse as a competitor with his former railroad. The La Crosse & Milwaukee Railroad was chartered in 1852 and became the second railroad to connect Milwaukee to the Mississippi River. Kilbourn's public career was ruined following a scandal alleging the use of around $900,000 ($31.1 million today) in railroad bonds to bribe dozens of state officials including Governor Coles Bashford, for land grants necessary for the railroad. The La Crosse & Milwaukee Railroad Company failed in the aftermath of the scandal and subsequent investigations.

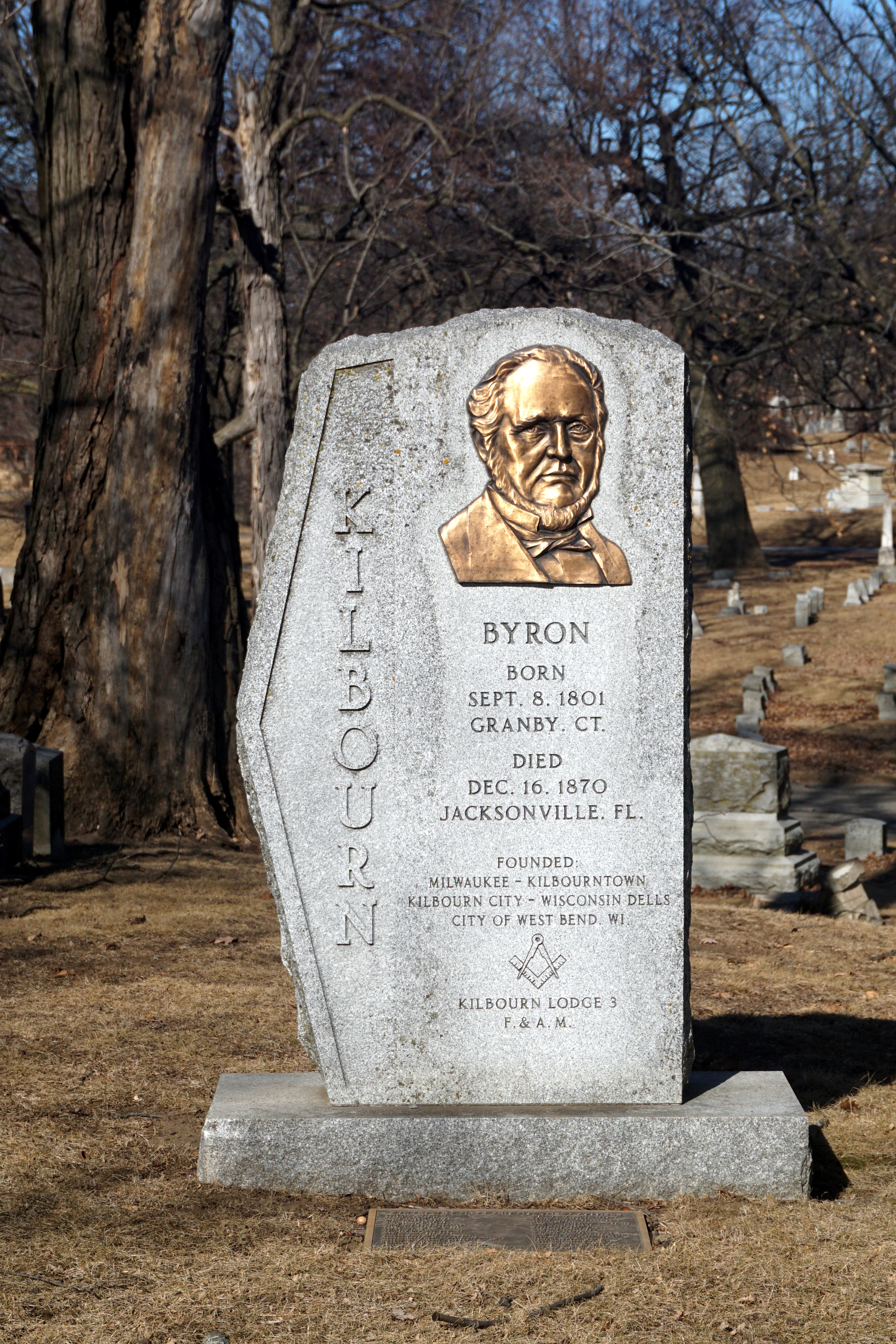
Monument in Forest Home Cemetery, Milwaukee.

In 1868, a decade after the railroad scandals, Kilbourn moved to Jacksonville, Florida, to relieve arthritis symptoms. He died there December 16, 1870, age 69, and was buried in Jacksonville. Historic Milwaukee, Inc. worked to have him re-interred in Milwaukee because he was the only one of the three Milwaukee founders not buried in there. In late 1998 Kilbourn's remains were returned to Milwaukee for interment at Forest Home Cemetery.

== Personal life and family ==
Byron Kilbourn was the sixth of at least 8 children born to James Kilbourne (1770–1850) and his first wife Lucy (née Fitch; 1769–1807). James Kilbourne was an Ohio pioneer, founder of Worthington, Ohio, and represented Ohio for two terms in the U.S. House of Representatives. The Kilbourns were descendants of the colonist Thomas Kilborne, who came to the Connecticut Colony from England some time before 1639.

Byron Kilbourn married Mary Henrietta Cowles in 1827, in Franklin County, Ohio. They had three children, though both daughters died young in the pioneer years in the Wisconsin Territory. Mary died in 1837, and Byron subsequently remarried with Henrietta Karrick. With his second wife, he had two more sons, though only one survived to adulthood. Their son Byron Hector Kilbourn served as a lieutenant in the Union Army during the American Civil War, and later became a medical doctor.

== Bibliography ==
- "Another pioneer gone". Milwaukee Sentinel. December 19, 1870.

Political offices
Preceded by Horatio N. Wells	Mayor of Milwaukee, Wisconsin; April 1848 – April 1849	Succeeded by Don A. J. Upham
Preceded by George H. Walker	Mayor of Milwaukee, Wisconsin; April 1854 – April 1855	Succeeded by James B. Cross
