= William Rittenhouse (politician) =

American politician

William Rittenhouse (May 7, 1794 – November 19, 1862) was an American politician who was a member of the Wisconsin State Senate.

== Biography ==
Rittenhouse was born on May 7, 1794, in Hunterdon County, New Jersey. He died on November 19, 1862, in Jefferson, Green County, Wisconsin, and was buried in Monroe, Wisconsin.

== Career ==
Rittenhouse was the clerk of the Green County District Court in the 1840s. Rittenhouse was a member of the Senate from the 8th District during the 1850 and 1851 sessions. He was a Democrat.
