= Armstead C. Brown =

American politician

Armstead, Armisted, Armistead C. or A. C. Brown (January 10, 1816 – December 17, 1902) was an American farmer, miner and lawyer from Wisconsin and later California, who served a single term in the 1st Wisconsin Legislature as a Whig member of the Wisconsin State Assembly. He then moved to California as a Forty-Niner, where he became one of the founding fathers of Amador County, becoming a merchant, judge and legislator in Jackson, California.

== Background ==
Brown was born in St. Charles County, Missouri, on January 10, 1816, one of the four sons and two daughters of Thomas Brown (a cabinetmaker and farmer) and Mary Elizabeth (Ribolt) Brown. In 1820, the family moved to Illinois, where the father died. His mother afterward married again, and died in 1830. Brown received a rudimentary education in his youth while working on the family farm. In 1832 he moved to Wisconsin, where he worked in lead mining, and served in the Black Hawk War as a member of the territorial militia. He studied law on his own, and was admitted to the Wisconsin bar. On February 26, 1837, he married Phillippia Williams.

== Public life in Wisconsin ==
In 1844 Brown was one of the leaders in Grant County to the movement opposing the first proposed Wisconsin Constitution, because it allowed resident aliens to vote. After serving as a Representative from Grant County in the 4th and 5th sessions of the Legislative Assembly of the Wisconsin Territory in 1846 and 1847 (he was an unsuccessful nominee for Speaker in the latter session), Brown was elected to the first Assembly in early 1848 as a Whig, to represent the Grant County district which included the districts of Hurricane, New Lisbon, Pleasant Valley, Potosi and Waterloo. He was succeeded in 1849 by Democrat Davis Gillilan.

== Off to California ==
In 1849 Brown crossed the Great Plains as part of the California Gold Rush, and began placer mining in Shasta County; one account credits him with naming the boomtown of Shasta. Having been successful, he decided to move permanently, returning for his family by "the water route": down the Pacific coast to the Isthmus of Panama, across the Isthmus, thence to New Orleans, from there up the Mississippi River. He cut all business ties left in Wisconsin, and in 1851 again crossed the Plains, this time in company with his wife and six children.

Brown took up residence in Jackson in Amador County in 1851, and became a merchant, bringing his goods by team over the mountains from the coast, and a landlord. He resumed the practice of law.

== Public life in California ==
With the dissolution of the Whigs, Brown affiliated with the Democratic Party. He was elected to three terms as a Union Party member of the California State Assembly: 9-5-1865, 1-26-1866 and 11-3-186. At the end of his third term he chose not to seek re-election and declined any further runs for legislative office, instead returning to his law practice in Jackson.

In 1876 Brown was elected the probate judge of Amador County, an office he filled for five years before once again returning to the private practice of law. In 1887 he was admitted to practice before the Supreme Court of California.

== Later years ==
Phillippia died in April 1896. Brown retired from practice in 1897, having made extensive investments in local real estate, to the management of which he devoted his time well into the subsequent century.

He died on December 17, 1902.

The 15-room Greek Revival brick house he had built in 1859, one of the few to survive the city's devastating 1863 fire which destroyed over 30 tenements Brown owned at the time, now houses the museum of the Amador County Historical Society.
