= Elisha T. Gardner =

American politician

E. T. Gardner

District Attorney of Green County, Wisconsin
- In office January 1, 1863 – January 1, 1865
- Preceded by: Moses O'Brien
- Succeeded by: C. N. Carpenter
- In office January 1, 1851 – January 1, 1855
- Preceded by: B. Dunwhiddie
- Succeeded by: Hiram Stevens

Member of the Wisconsin Senate from the 8th district
- In office June 5, 1848 – January 9, 1850
- Preceded by: Position Established
- Succeeded by: William Rittenhouse

Representative to the Legislative Assembly of the Wisconsin Territory from Dane, Green, and Sauk Counties
- In office October 18, 1847 – March 13, 1848 Serving with Alexander Botkin and John W. Stewart
- Preceded by: Charles Lum; William Wheeler; John W. Stewart
- Succeeded by: Legislature abolished

Personal details
- Born: April 23, 1811 Kittery, Maine
- Died: February 3, 1879 (aged 67) Monroe, Wisconsin
- Party: Republican (after 1856); Democrat (until 1856)

Elisha Temple Gardner (April 23, 1811 – February 3, 1879) was an American lawyer, politician, and Wisconsin pioneer. He was a member of the last session of the Legislative Assembly of the Wisconsin Territory and the 1st and 2nd sessions of the Wisconsin State Senate. He also served several local and county offices in Green County, Wisconsin. In historical documents, he is often referred to as E. T. Gardner.

== Early life ==
Gardner was born in Kittery, Maine, son of Silas E. Gardner and Huidah Temple Gardner. Shortly after his birth, his family moved to Portsmouth, New Hampshire, and in 1816, he attempted to journey west to the new U.S. territories. They spent the winter of 1816–1817 in the Holland Purchase in western New York. The following Spring, they went to Olean Port on the Allegheny River, where they built a flatboat and set off with the entire family and all their worldly possessions. They traveled down the Allegheny, into the Ohio River, to Lawrenceburg, Indiana. His father died at Lawrenceburg, leaving the family in desperate circumstances. His mother, Huldah, was able to get the family and their possessions back to Cincinnati, where the family was aided by the Freemasons, of which Silas Gardner had been a member. They remained at Cincinnati until the Summer of 1818, when they moved on to Madison County, Illinois.

In Illinois, the young Gardner attended a frontier school for seven or eight months, the only formal schooling he received. He was fond of books, however, and spent a great deal of time reading and studying on his own. At age 16, some of his friends wanted to send him to college to prepare for ministry in the Methodist Episcopal Church, but he refused—his older brother had already left home, and he was the sole support for his mother.

== Working in Illinois and Michigan Territory ==
In the Spring of 1827, the 16-year-old Gardner rented and planted eighteen acres of land and worked on side jobs between planting and harvest. He then went west to St. Louis, Missouri, looking for further employment, but was unsuccessful. By chance, he encountered a keelboat bound for Galena, Illinois, and came to an agreement with the captain to work aboard the ship during its journey. Two days before arriving at Galena, however, Gardner fell ill with a fever. The captain abandoned him at Galena without pay. Fortunately for Gardner, he had a half-brother and cousin living and working in the mining regions near Galena.

Weak with fever, he walked along an Indian trail from Galena into the mining regions. Due to his condition, he had to lie down several times on the route, but arrived at his family's cabin near midnight. After the fever ran its course, Gardner suffered from a shaking ague for nearly a year.

The next year Gardner and his cousin went north into what was then the western portion of the Michigan Territory (now the state of Wisconsin), to work in the lead mines at "Platteville Diggings". This was near the height of the "lead rush" in the region. Gardner built a cabin there, about a mile north of the settlement that became the village Platteville, and remained there with his cousin through the Winter of 1827–1828. Gardner spent his nights reading by an improvised lamp, made from a lump of lard, a rag, and a button. His library was limited, but included a Bible, a history of the United States, and a Webster's spelling book. Among the miners, Gardner met others who were inclined toward intellectual improvement, and he became one of the founders of a local "debating society". He quickly earned a reputation as a disputant, and, in later years, would say that he "graduated by the side of a mineral hole."

In the Fall of 1828, he set out to return to Illinois. He would later describe the trip, saying he traveled across 250 miles of wilderness "without seeing a human habitation". On his return home, he found his little cabin and clearing gone, and so began again, building a new cabin. In 1829, the Gardners moved to St. Clair County, Illinois. In the Fall of 1831, having married the woman who would be his wife for the rest of his life, Gardner, despite working long hard hours as a teamster driving his own ox team, was deeply in debt. He disposed of the oxen and traded a two-year-old colt he owned for some carpenter's tools, and went to Alton, Illinois, where he worked as a carpenter and joiner, returning home to visit with his wife and mother. By 1835, he had not only paid the debt (with interest), but was able to move his family to Alton, building up a profitable house-building business.

== Career in Wisconsin ==
In 1839, he was once more taken ill, unable to work for nearly a year, and came near dying. On two occasions, he visited Wisconsin to improve his health. He benefitted in particular by his second journey, but upon returning to Illinois suffered a relapse. He decided to move permanently to Wisconsin in the Spring of 1840, and arrived in Green County, Wisconsin Territory, on June 10, 1840. He built a cabin and a sawmill on Skinner's Creek, eight miles west of the spot where Monroe would later be built. Upon the advice of a friend, Gardner took up the study and practice of law. He opened an office in Monroe on December 23, 1842, was admitted to the bar in 1843, and practiced law in Green County for the rest of his life. From 1850 to 1852, he also supplemented this income with the operation of a general store in Farmer's Grove.

Although the law became his primary profession, he never lost his connections to agriculture. In 1853, a Green County Agricultural Society was organized, and he was elected as its first president, a title which he resumed in 1862, and again in 1869. In 1861, at the 11th annual Wisconsin State Fair, he served as a judge for "Machinery for the manufacture of sorghum syrup and sugar"; and repeated the duty in 1864.

== Public office ==
In 1841, Gardner was elected an assessor for the county, and in 1842, was elected as "county commissioner" (equivalent to a county supervisor). He was appointed justice of the peace in 1843, by Henry Dodge, Territorial Governor of Wisconsin. In 1844, he was elected county tax collector; in 1845 and 1846, county clerk.

He served as a Democratic Representative in the last two sessions of the Fifth and last Legislative Assembly of the Wisconsin Territory, and as a member of the first two sessions of the Wisconsin State Senate, representing the 8th Senate district—at that time consisting of Green County. He refused re-nomination in 1849.

In 1850 and 1852, he was elected district attorney for the county. As chairman of the town of York, Gardner was, in 1851, ex officio a member of the Green County Board of Supervisors, and was elected its chairman. This happened again in 1856.

Gardner was strongly anti-slavery, but had always been a Democrat. That changed when the Democrats nominated James Buchanan for president in 1856. Gardner became a member of the new Republican Party and remained an enthusiastic member for the rest of his life. During the American Civil War, he was appointed draft commissioner for his district; his own son, Silas Gardner, served as a lieutenant during the war, and was later elected sheriff of the county.

In 1862, he was again elected district attorney. He seems to have moved into Monroe at about this time, as he was elected as a Village "trustee" (city council member), serving from 1862 to 1864. In 1866, he was elected to the first school board for the village. In 1869, Gardner was an unsuccessful candidate for county judge. In 1873 he was again elected a village trustee, as well as chairman of the board of trustees. In 1876, he was selected by the members of the Wisconsin Senate to serve as Sergeant-at-Arms.

== Later years and heritage ==
By the time of the second annual meeting of the Old Settlers' Club of Green County in 1870, Gardner was by two years the earliest-arriving member of the club. Gardner died near Monroe on February 3, 1879. The ceremony was presided over by the Masons, of which body Gardner, like his father, had been a member for some years.

Wisconsin Senate
New state government	Member of the Wisconsin Senate from the 8th district June 5, 1848 – January 9, 1850	Succeeded by William Rittenhouse
Legal offices
Preceded by B. Dunwhiddie	District Attorney of Green County, Wisconsin; January 1, 1851 – January 1, 1855	Succeeded by Hiram Stevens
Preceded by Moses O'Brien	District Attorney of Green County, Wisconsin; January 1, 1863 – January 1, 1865	Succeeded by C. N. Carpenter
