= Solon Johnson =

American farmer and politician (1810–1886)

Solon Johnson (April 1810 - November 19, 1886) was a pioneer farmer from Port Washington, Wisconsin who spent two one-year terms as a member of the Wisconsin State Assembly from Washington County, Wisconsin and held various local offices, before moving on to become a prospector and miner in California and Montana.

== Background ==
Johnson was born in April 1810 in the vicinity of Syracuse, New York. He came to Wisconsin Territory about 1838, and took up farming in the Town of Lake in Milwaukee County. By April 1842, he filed for bankruptcy there.

In 1843, Johnson was among the first permanent settlers of what was to become Port Washington, wading ashore with founder Wooster Harrison and a handful of others to raft families and luggage from their boat, to reestablish the foundering settlement. These early settlers became known as the "Yankee" element (even though many of them were Irish in origin), as distinguished from the German, Norwegian and Luxembourger immigrants who soon began to arrive.

Solon is described by Wisconsin historian Harry Cole as "slender of body, lank in limb, standing more than six feet five inches. He is said to have been kindly and magnanimous but somewhat eccentric, with a sense of humor revealed in various drolleries."

== Public office ==
In 1846, he became a member of the county board of supervisors, and upon the formal establishment of the Town of Port Washington, was elected to its first town board (equivalent to a city council). He was also the Democratic nominee for county sheriff. In early 1848 he was the Democratic candidate for the Wisconsin State Senate for Washington County, but lost to Frederick W. Horn, who was running as an "Independent Democrat" ("stump candidate", in the jargon of the era). In late 1848 he was elected as a Democrat to the State Assembly's 1st Washington County district, succeeding fellow Democrat Henry Allen, for the 1849 session (the 2nd Wisconsin Legislature). When he took office in January, he was reported as being 38 years old, from New York, and as having been in Wisconsin for nine years. He was assigned to the standing committees on roads, bridges and ferries; and on agriculture and manufactures. He was re-elected for the 1850 session. In 1850 he supported James Duane Doty, the Whig candidate for United States Representative, and was defeated for re-election; he was succeeded in the 1851 session by Horn, now the Democratic nominee.

== After the Assembly ==
Johnson remained in Port Washington until about 1856, when he left permanently for California. He had gone to California earlier, placer mining and doing other things. In 1864, he moved on to Alder Gulch, Montana, where he took up mining, and in 1865 to Silver Bow County, Montana, where he continued mining and prospecting, eventually settling in Butte. He was again active in the Democratic Party.

He died of pneumonia November 19, 1886 in Walkerville, Montana, having but recently returned from a trip to Milwaukee to visit old friends in southeastern Wisconsin. He was understood to have become quite prosperous, and had spent a good part of the previous two years in travel around the country. He was a Freemason, and his funeral was held at the local Masonic Temple. When his estate was appraised, it was valued at $10,680 equivalent to $382,700 in 2025.
