= William Wheeler (Wisconsin politician) =

19th century American politician

Treasurer of Dane County, Wisconsin
- In office January 1, 1855 – January 1, 1857
- Preceded by: Philo Dunning
- Succeeded by: E. H. Gleason

Member of the House of Representatives of the Wisconsin Territory for Dane, Green, & Sauk counties
- In office January 4, 1847 – February 11, 1847 Serving with Charles Lum & John W. Stewart
- Preceded by: Noah Phelps, Mark R. Clapp, & William M. Dennis
- Succeeded by: John W. Stewart, Elisha T. Gardner, & Alexander Botkin

Personal details
- Born: October 3, 1814 Fairfield County, Connecticut. U.S.
- Died: May 5, 1881 (aged 66) Middleton, Wisconsin, U.S.
- Resting place: Forest Hill Cemetery, Madison, Wisconsin
- Party: Democratic
- Spouse: Caroline P. Luce (m. 1836–1881)
- Children: William A. Wheeler Jr.; (b. 1842; died 1864)

Military service
- Allegiance: United States
- Branch/service: Wisconsin Militia; United States Army; Union Army
- Years of service: 1859–1863 (Wis.); 1863–1865 (USA)
- Rank: Captain, USA; Brevet Major, USA
- Unit: Army Commissary Dept.
- Battles/wars: American Civil War

William A. Wheeler (October 3, 1814 – May 5, 1881) was an American millwright, politician, and Wisconsin pioneer. He was a member of the 5th Wisconsin Territorial Assembly and was a delegate to Wisconsin's second constitutional convention, which produced the current Constitution of Wisconsin. He was an important early settler in Madison, Wisconsin, and was responsible for building most of the mills in the county in those early decades.

== Early life ==
Born in Fairfield County, Connecticut, he received a common school and select school education, and was trained as a millwright, machinist, and engineer. In the Summer of 1837, he moved to Madison, Wisconsin Territory, coming by way of Detroit.

== Career ==
Wheeler was said to have been the builder of nearly all of the early grist and saw mills in Dane County, Wisconsin. One of his first jobs upon arriving in Madison was the construction of a saw-mill on the bank of Lake Mendota. That mill produced much of the lumber for the creation of the first Wisconsin capitol building in Madison (technically the second Wisconsin capitol building, the first being in Belmont, Wisconsin).

Dane County was first organized for political purposes in 1839, and at the first county election, Wheeler was chosen as the first county assessor. He subsequently served three terms on the county board of commissioners, in 1843, 1844, and 1846. In the fall of 1846, he was elected as a Dane County representative to the first session of the 5th Wisconsin Territorial Assembly, which was supposed to be the last session before the ratification of Wisconsin's state constitution. Voters, however, rejected that constitution and a new constitutional convention was called for the Winter of 1847. Wheeler was elected as a delegate to that convention.

After Wisconsin statehood, he was elected county treasurer in 1854, but was defeated when seeking re-election in 1856. He was a Democratic candidate for Wisconsin State Senate in 1861, in Wisconsin's 26th State Senate district, but was defeated by Republican Benjamin F. Hopkins.

In the years immediately preceding the American Civil War, Wheeler became involved with the Wisconsin militia and was quartermaster for a Dane County cavalry company, led by Harlow S. Orton. During the war, he received a formal commission from President Abraham Lincoln as a captain in the Army Commissary Department and managed supplies in Tennessee until the end of the war. After the war, he received an honorary brevet to the rank of major.

== Personal life ==
Wheeler married Caroline P. Luce on September 18, 1836. They had at least one son together, though he died relatively young, in 1864. Wheeler died in Middleton, Wisconsin, on May 5, 1881.
