= Zelotus Cotton =

American politician

Zelotus Abijah Cotton was an American from Milwaukee, Wisconsin who served a single one-year term as a Democratic member of the Wisconsin State Assembly, in 1849, from Milwaukee County.

On September 27, 1846 he married Ellen A. Lee in Milwaukee.
