= William Shew (politician) =

19th-century American politician

William Shew (1805 – April 12, 1883) was a farmer and businessman from Oak Creek, Wisconsin and Cordova, Illinois who served multiple terms in the Wisconsin Territory House of Representatives representing Milwaukee County, and was Speaker of the House of that body during the first (1847) session of the 5th Wisconsin Territorial Assembly, as well as holding various local government posts.

== Background ==
Shew was born 1805 near Rochester, New York in 1805, moved with parents to Dayton, Ohio and lived with them "until manhood" (as his obituary phrased it), when he married Elizabeth Robbe. He settled with her in Monroe, Michigan Territory and went into business there. In 1836, they moved to Milwaukee County in Wisconsin Territory, where he acquired government land and took up farming in Oak Creek. He also had a mill with his brother Henry on the Kinnickinnic River.

== Public office ==
On March 29, 1837, Shew was one of the Democratic nominees for Milwaukee county supervisor. In April 1838, he was elected as a tax assessor for Milwaukee County.

In October 1838 Shew was one of the five members elected from the Territorial House of Representatives district consisting of Milwaukee and Washington counties for the 2nd Wisconsin Territorial Assembly. In June 1839, it was announced that a replacement for Shew, who had resigned from the House, would be elected in August; but later records show Shew as a member of the third session held on December 2, 1839 – January 13, 1840, and a fourth (extra) session held from August 3–14, 1840. He was seen as a particular foe of the Milwaukee and Rock River Canal, a project which he argued should be abandoned.

In August 1844, Shew was described by the openly-partisan Wisconsin Argus as one of several "intelligent farmers" on the Democratic ticket for that year's election. He was a member of the third session (January 6, 1845 – February 24, 1845) of the 4th Wisconsin Territorial Assembly, but not the fourth session of 1846.

In 1846, he was listed on a "People's Union Ticket" in the Milwaukee Sentinel, opposed to the Whig Party Ticket of that year, and made up mostly of local Democrats. He was elected as one of the three representatives for Milwaukee County (Washington County was now in a different district), and when the House convened on January 4, 1847, he was elected Speaker of the House by a vote of twenty to four with two blank ballots. In April 1848, he served as chairman of the local Democratic convention which nominated Andrew Sullivan for the 5th Milwaukee County district (the Towns of Franklin and Oak Creek) of the new Wisconsin State Assembly.

== Personal life ==
The Pioneer History of Milwaukee says of Shew, "In person Mr. Shew was of medium height, large head, dark hair and large dark eyes, complexion slightly florid, voice quite soft and musical in tone, spoke slowly and distinctly, and always looked you squarely in the face when addressing you. He was very broad across the shoulders for a man of his weight, 180 pounds, and must have been, when in his prime, possessed of great muscular power. He had a kindly disposition, and was very social. He was much in office in his day in town and county... and if not successful in obtaining what legislation he deemed best for his constituents, it certainly was not for the want of zeal. True, in oratory he was not a Henry Ward Beecher, or a Cicero.... But that he was the peer, if not the superior, of many of his associates in those early times, will not be denied; neither was his honesty of purpose ever questioned."

In February 1852, Shew was appointed vice-president for Oak Creek of the Milwaukee and Waukesha County Agricultural Society.

== After Wisconsin ==
In April 1856, he moved to Princeton, Iowa, doing business until the outbreak of the American Civil War, at which time he left Iowa for Cordova, Illinois, where he would live for the rest of his life. Soon after arriving in Cordova, he was elected a justice of the peace, a position to which he was re-elected several times. His wife Elizabeth died in 1870, and in 1873 he married Chriatiana Wood of Princeton. He served as a village trustee for Cordova (including a term as President of the board of village trustees) and as a Justice of the Peace on and off from 1879 until his death on April 12, 1883, leaving his widow Chriatiana and three adult daughters surviving.
