= Morgan Noble =

American politician

Morgan L. Noble (1817–1857) was an American Methodist minister, and later lumberman from Fond du Lac, Wisconsin, who spent two one-year terms in 1849-1850 as a member of the Wisconsin State Assembly from Fond du Lac County, first as a Free Soiler, then as a Democrat.

Morgan came to Fond du Lac in 1845 as a circuit rider, but a colleague would remember years later that while Noble was "a man of superior talent", his health proved unequal to the challenges of the role, and at the end of the two-year term he first "took a location" (i.e., ceased riding a circuit), and eventually sought a secular profession. While serving on the circuit, he was reportedly "in great demand at all weddings." He and a fellow Methodist minister built a house which they shared in town, but when the two quarreled, they divided their interests by sawing the building in two.

== Public office ==
In 1849, he succeeded Whig Charles Doty for the Wisconsin Legislature's Second Session as a member of the Assembly's 2nd Fond du Lac County district (the Towns of Calumet, Forest, Auburn, Byron, Taychedah and Fond du Lac), being elected as a Free Soiler. He was re-elected for the 1850 session, but had now switched to the Democratic Party. He was succeeded in 1851 by Morris S. Barnett, also a Democrat.

He served Fond du Lac as a justice of the peace in 1852, and an alderman in 1853.

In 1857, Noble was elected to the Minnesota Territorial House of Representatives; he resigned before the start of the 1857 extra session. Noble moved to California in 1857 and settled in Stockton, California with his wife and family. He died in Stockton, California.

== Shinglemaking ==
In 1853 Noble became a partner with lumberman Charles Colman (son of an old Methodist clerical colleague) in the manufacturing of shingles. In 1854 they took their horse-powered shingle-making machine and moved the business to La Crosse, Wisconsin, and in 1855 Colman bought out his partners.
