= Milo Kelsey =

Milo Kelsey, member of the Wisconsin State Legislative Assembly

Milo Kelsey (May 27, 1808 – 1855) was a member of the Wisconsin State Assembly.

== Biography ==
Kelsey was born on May 27, 1808, in Smyrna, New York. He died in 1855.

== Career ==
Kelsey was a member of the Assembly in 1848 and 1849. He was a Whig.
