= Alexander Botkin =

19th century Wisconsin politician

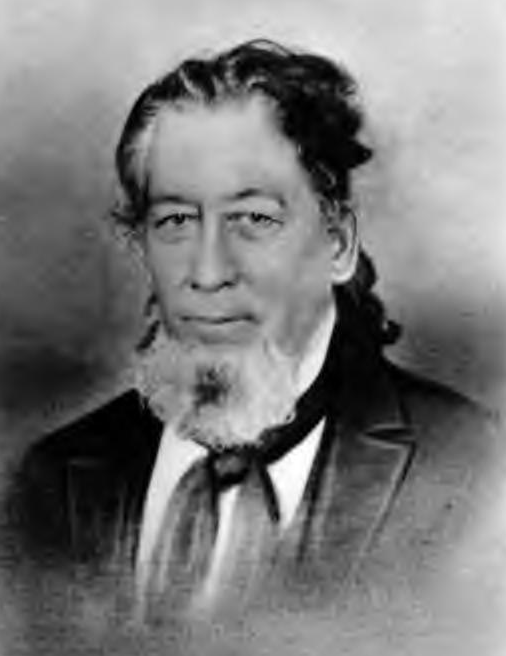

Member of the Wisconsin Senate from the 9th district
- In office January 1, 1849 – January 1, 1851
- Preceded by: Simeon Mills
- Succeeded by: Eliab B. Dean, Jr.

Member of the Wisconsin State Assembly from the Dane 2nd district
- In office January 1, 1852 – January 1, 1853
- Preceded by: Augustus A. Bird
- Succeeded by: Henry L. Foster

Member of the House of Representatives of the Wisconsin Territory for Dane, Green, and Sauk counties
- In office October 18, 1847 – March 13, 1848 Serving with Elisha T. Gardner & John W. Stewart
- Preceded by: Charles Lum, William Wheeler, & John W. Stewart
- Succeeded by: Position Abolished

Personal details
- Born: March 4, 1801 Kentucky, U.S.
- Died: March 5, 1857 (aged 56) Sun Prairie, Wisconsin, U.S.
- Cause of death: Stroke
- Resting place: Forest Hill Cemetery; Madison, Wisconsin
- Spouse: Jane Roslin Sinclair (died 1874)
- Children: Sinclair W. Botkin^{(b. 1837; died 1893)}; William Wallace Botkin^{(b. 1840; died 1914)}; Alexander Campbell Botkin^{(b. 1842; died 1905)}
- Profession: Lawyer

Alexander Botkin (March 4, 1801 – March 5, 1857) was an American lawyer, politician, and pioneer settler of Dane County, Wisconsin. He served one term each as a member of the Wisconsin Senate and Wisconsin State Assembly.

== Biography ==
Born in Kentucky, at an early age he moved to Hamilton County, Ohio, and then to Alton, Illinois, in 1832, where he practiced law. He was serving as a justice of the peace at the time of the riots that resulted in the murder of abolitionist Elijah P. Lovejoy, and was active in attempting to preserve order in the city.

He moved north into the Wisconsin Territory in 1841, to work as the assistant secretary of the territory under Alexander Pope Field, in Madison. While living there, he also worked as a law partner to Field, and became active in politics. He was a candidate for delegate to Wisconsin's first constitutional convention in 1846, but was defeated by John Y. Smith. After the first constitution was rejected by voters, however, he was elected to serve in the 5th Wisconsin Territorial Assembly as a representative of Dane, Green, and Sauk counties. This was the last session of the territorial government before the adoption of Wisconsin's second constitution and their admission as a U.S. state.

In the 1848 fall general election, Botkin was elected to a two-year term in the Wisconsin Senate running on the Whig Party ticket. He represented Dane County in the 2nd and 3rd legislatures. During the 1849 session, he was the Whig nominee for United States Senator, but the Democrats held a substantial majority in the Legislature and selected Isaac P. Walker instead. He ran for re-election in 1850, but was defeated. After leaving the Senate, he was elected to a one-year term in the Wisconsin State Assembly for the 5th Wisconsin Legislature.

He died of a stroke while stopping at Angel's Hotel in Sun Prairie, Wisconsin, and was buried in Madison, Wisconsin.

== Personal life and family ==
Botkin was married to Jane Roslin Sinclair, who survived him. One of their sons was Alexander Campbell Botkin, who became Lieutenant Governor of Montana.

Wisconsin State Assembly
| Preceded by Augustus A. Bird | Member of the Wisconsin State Assembly from the Dane 2nd district January 1, 1852 – January 1, 1853 | Succeeded by Henry L. Foster |
Wisconsin Senate
| Preceded by Simeon Mills | Member of the Wisconsin Senate from the 9th district January 1, 1849 – January 1, 1851 | Succeeded by Eliab B. Dean Jr. |
