= James Holliday (politician) =

American politician

Member of the Wisconsin Territorial House of Representatives
- In office 1847–1848

Personal details
- Born: January 19, 1818; Wayne Township, Mifflin County, Pennsylvania, U.S.
- Died: May 16, 1851 (aged 33); Milwaukee, Wisconsin, U.S.
- Occupation: Lawyer

James Holliday (January 19, 1818 – May 16, 1851) was an American lawyer and politician.

== Early life ==
Holliday was born in Wayne Township, Mifflin County, Pennsylvania.

== Career ==
Holliday studied law and was admitted to the Pennsylvania bar. In 1843, Holliday moved to Milwaukee, Wisconsin Territory, and practiced law. In 1847 and 1848, he served in the Wisconsin Territorial House of Representatives and helped prepare the second Wisconsin Constitutional Convention of 1847.

== Personal life ==
Holliday died suddenly in Milwaukee during a court session of a heart attack.
