= Andrew Sullivan (politician) =

American politician

Andrew Sullivan was a member of the Wisconsin State Assembly during the 1st Wisconsin Legislature (1848). Sullivan represented the 5th District of Milwaukee County, Wisconsin. He was a Democrat.
