= Walter S. Wescott =

American politician and pioneer

Member of the Wisconsin Senate from the 24th district
- In office January 4, 1864 – January 1, 1866
- Preceded by: Edmund A. West
- Succeeded by: Henry Adams

Member of the Wisconsin State Assembly from the Green 1st district
- In office January 5, 1863 – January 4, 1864
- Preceded by: Calvin D. W. Leonard
- Succeeded by: William W. McLaughlin
- In office January 2, 1860 – January 7, 1861
- Preceded by: Albert H. Pierce
- Succeeded by: James Campbell

Personal details
- Born: April 18, 1828 Wethersfield, New York, U.S.
- Died: March 31, 1908 (aged 79) Wescott, Nebraska, U.S.
- Resting place: Douglas Grove Cemetery, Comstock, Nebraska
- Party: Republican; Democratic (before 1856)
- Spouse: Thankful B. Cleveland (m. 1855–1908)
- Children: Ida May (Gibbons)^{(b. 1856; died 1904)}; Eda Mary Wescott^{(b. 1857; died 1858)}; Inez Wescott^{(b. 1858; died 1858)}; Eva Marie (Bragg)^{(b. 1859; died 1937)}; John James Wescott^{(b. 1864; died 1947)}; Walter Wescott^{(b. 1867; died 1881)}
- Relatives: Ezra Wescott (brother); Jefferson F. Wescott (brother)

Walter Scott Wescott (April 18, 1828 – March 31, 1908) was an American rancher, Republican politician, and pioneer of Wisconsin and Nebraska. He was the founder and namesake of Wescott, Nebraska. Before settling in Nebraska, he was a prominent settler and politician in Green County, Wisconsin, and represented Green County for two years in the Wisconsin Senate (1864, 1865), and for two years in the state Assembly (1860, 1863).

His elder brothers, Ezra Irving Wescott and Jefferson Fayette Wescott, were also notable politicians and Wisconsin pioneers, and both also served in the state Assembly.

== Early life ==
Walter Wescott was born in Wethersfield, New York, in 1828. He was raised there on his father's farm and received his education in New York before moving west with his parents in 1843, following the migration of his two elder brothers. His parents settled on a farm in the town of New Glarus, Green County, Wisconsin Territory.

In his early adulthood, Walter Wescott resided on a farm in the town of York in Green County, where his brother Jefferson was already established. In 1862, he built a trade post with his brother, Jefferson, in the town of York, which the two co-owned until Jefferson bought out his brother in 1866. In 1866, Wescott moved to a farm in the town of Adams, before finally settling a farm in Monroe, Wisconsin, which remained his home for the remainder of his time in Wisconsin.

Wescott was always active in the local farming community, and was an officer in the Green County Agricultural Society in 1867 and 1882.

== Wisconsin political career ==
Wescott was originally a Democrat, taking after his father, and cast his first vote for the Democratic ticket. But, in the 1850s, he was inspired by the new Republican Party, voting for John C. Fremont in 1856, and always after that associating with the Republican Party.

In 1859, Wescott was the Republican nominee for Wisconsin State Assembly in Green County's 1st Assembly district, then comprising the northern half of the county. He won the general election by 54 votes, and went on to serve in the 13th Wisconsin Legislature. He did not run for re-election in 1860, but that year he was a delegate to the Republican National Convention which nominated Abraham Lincoln.

After the outbreak of the American Civil War, Wescott was active in encouraging recruitment for the Union Army, but did not volunteer for service. In 1862, he was again the nominee for Wisconsin State Assembly in Green County's northern district, and was elected to serve in the 16th Wisconsin Legislature. His brother, Ezra, was elected to that same term from Green County's southern district. In the fall of 1863, Wescott received the Union nomination for Wisconsin Senate in the 24th Senate district—the Republican Party branding as the "Union Party" during this phase of the Civil War. The 24th Senate district at that time comprised just Green County. Wescott won a landslide victory in the 1863 election, receiving 70% of the vote; he went on to represent Green County in the state Senate for the 1864 and 1865 terms.

Wescott did not run for re-election to the Senate in 1865. In 1869, Wescott received the regular Republican nomination to run for Wisconsin Senate again, defeating former Union Army general James Bintliff at the nominating convention. Disaffected Republicans in the district, however, decided to back former Union Army surgeon John C. Hall as an independent Republican candidate. At the general election, Hall prevailed by just 77 votes.

Out of office, Wescott remained very active in local Republican Party affairs. In 1874, while participating as chairman of the nominating convention for U.S. House of Representatives in Wisconsin's 3rd congressional district, the convention was unable to select a nominee after 100 ballots. On the second morning of the convention, Wescott's name was briefly entered into nomination and secured significant delegate support as a potential compromise candidate, but explained that he would not accept the nomination. Wescott's name was placed in nomination for lieutenant governor of Wisconsin at the 1875 Republican state convention, but received only eight votes at the first formal ballot, Henry L. Eaton being nominated on the second ballot.

== Nebraska pioneer ==
While continuing to reside in Wisconsin, in 1880, Wescott partnered with his son-in-law Edward Gibbons in purchasing a large ranch in central Nebraska, near what is now the village of Comstock. During that year, Wescott shipped 1,000 head of cattle from Wisconsin to his new Nebraska ranch, but the terrible winter of 1880–1881 killed nearly his entire herd, leaving just under 70. Undaunted, the following year Wescott shipped another 1,000 head of cattle from Wisconsin. Ultimately the firm of Wescott & Gibbons flourished as a successful cattle and horse dealer in Nebraska.

Wescott moved permanently to his ranch in Nebraska in 1886. He established a post office there, naming his settlement Wescott, Nebraska; over the next two years he built a general store and established a bank. When the Burlington railroad began construction, it's route resulted in the establishment of the nearby settlement of Comstock. Most of the commercial activity of Wescott was thus moved to the nearby railroad town; the Wescott post office was discontinued in 1901.

Wescott remained active in politics with the Republican Party of Nebraska and was active in the temperance movement, but was never a candidate for office in Nebraska.

== Personal life and family ==
Walter S. Wescott was the youngest of five known children of John Wescott and his wife Eunice (née Reed). After their move to Wisconsin, John Wescott was active in local politics and served as chairman of the Green County Board of Supervisors in 1850. Walter's elder brothers, Ezra Irving Wescott and Jefferson Fayette Wescott, also became notable politicians in Green County, Wisconsin, and both served in the Wisconsin State Assembly. The Wescott family were descendants of the colonist Richard Westcott, whose brother, Stukely Westcott, was one of the founders of the Rhode Island Colony; Walter's family descended from Richard's son John Westcott, who was one of the founders of Bedford, New York.

Walter Wescott married Thankful Blackwell Cleveland at her father's farm in Green County, Wisconsin, on January 28, 1855. Thankful Cleveland was a school teacher and had come to Wisconsin with her parents from Maine. Walter and Thankful had seven children, but four died in infancy or childhood.

Wescott died at his home in Wescott, Nebraska, on March 31, 1908. He was interred at Douglas Grove Cemetery, in Comstock.

== Electoral history ==
=== Wisconsin Assembly (1859) ===
| Year | Election | Date | Elected | | | | Defeated | | | | Total | Plurality |
|---|---|---|---|---|---|---|---|---|---|---|---|---|
| 1859 | General | Nov. 8 | Walter S. Wescott | Republican | 653 | 56.68% | Arnold Alder | Dem. | 499 | 43.32% | 1,152 | 54 |

=== Wisconsin Assembly (1862) ===
| Year | Election | Date | Elected | | | | Defeated | | | | Total | Plurality |
|---|---|---|---|---|---|---|---|---|---|---|---|---|
| 1862 | General | Nov. 4 | Walter S. Wescott | Republican | 665 | 60.07% | Jonas Shoock | Dem. | 442 | 39.93% | 1,107 | 223 |

=== Wisconsin Senate (1863) ===
| Year | Election | Date | Elected | | | | Defeated | | | | Total | Plurality |
|---|---|---|---|---|---|---|---|---|---|---|---|---|
| 1863 | General | Nov. 3 | Walter S. Wescott | Natl. Union | 2,017 | 70.28% | Thomas S. Bowen | Dem. | 853 | 29.72% | 2,870 | 1,164 |

=== Wisconsin Senate (1869) ===
| Year | Election | Date | Elected | | | | Defeated | | | | Total | Plurality |
|---|---|---|---|---|---|---|---|---|---|---|---|---|
| 1869 | General | Nov. 2 | John C. Hall | Ind. Rep. | 1,467 | 51.35% | Walter S. Wescott | Rep. | 1,390 | 48.65% | 2,857 | 77 |

Wisconsin State Assembly
| Preceded by Albert H. Pierce | Member of the Wisconsin State Assembly from the Green 1st district January 2, 1860 – January 7, 1861 | Succeeded by James Campbell |
| Preceded by Calvin D. W. Leonard | Member of the Wisconsin State Assembly from the Green 1st district January 5, 1863 – January 4, 1864 | Succeeded by William W. McLaughlin |
Wisconsin Senate
| Preceded by Edmund A. West | Member of the Wisconsin Senate from the 24th district January 4, 1864 – January 1, 1866 | Succeeded by Henry Adams |
