= Ezra Wescott =

American politician

Member of the Wisconsin State Assembly from the Green 2nd district
- In office January 5, 1863 – January 4, 1864
- Preceded by: Harvey T. Moore
- Succeeded by: Frederick B. Rolph

Register of Deeds of Green County, Wisconsin
- In office January 1, 1855 – January 1, 1857
- Preceded by: James M. Powell
- Succeeded by: James Bintliff

Personal details
- Born: 1818 Wethersfield, New York, U.S.
- Died: June 16, 1865 (aged 46–47) St. Anthony, Minnesota, U.S.
- Resting place: Greenwood Cemetery, Monroe, Wisconsin
- Party: Republican; Democratic (before 1854)
- Spouse: Nancy Lucinda Brown (m. 1845–1865)
- Children: John Ezra Wescott^{(b. 1846; died 1904)}; Ada Westcott^{(b. 1848; died 1856)}; Ella Westcott^{(b. 1849; died 1856)}; Mary Alta Wescott^{(b. 1852; died 1908)}; Myra Ida (Anderson)^{(b. 1857; died 1943)}; Dora Esther (Walker)^{(b. 1862; died 1916)}; Martha Ida Wescott^{(b. 1864; died 1880)}
- Relatives: Jefferson F. Wescott (brother); Walter S. Wescott (brother)

Ezra Irving Wescott (1818 – June 16, 1865) was an American farmer, educator, Republican politician, and Wisconsin pioneer. He served one term in the Wisconsin State Assembly, representing southern Green County during the 1863 term. He also served two years as register of deeds of Green County.

His younger brothers, Jefferson Fayette Wescott and Walter Scott Wescott, were also notable politicians and Wisconsin pioneers, and both also served in the state Legislature.

== Biography ==
Wescott was a school teacher in what would become Wiota, Wisconsin. He married Nancy Brown in November 1845 before eventually settling in Cadiz, Wisconsin. Wescott died in Minneapolis, Minnesota, where he had been receiving medical treatment.

His brothers, Jefferson and Walter, were also legislators and his father, John, was a local politician in New Glarus (town), Wisconsin.

== Political career ==
Wescott was a member of the Assembly during the 1863 session. Additionally, he was Magistrate of York, Green County, Wisconsin, Register of Deeds of Cadiz and Treasurer of Green County, Wisconsin. He was a Republican.

Wisconsin State Assembly
Preceded by Harvey T. Moore	Member of the Wisconsin State Assembly from the Green 2nd district January 5, 1863 – January 4, 1864	Succeeded by Frederick B. Rolph
Political offices
Preceded by James M. Powell	Register of Deeds of Green County, Wisconsin; January 1, 1855 – January 1, 1857	Succeeded by James Bintliff
