= Saranac Lakes Wild Forest =

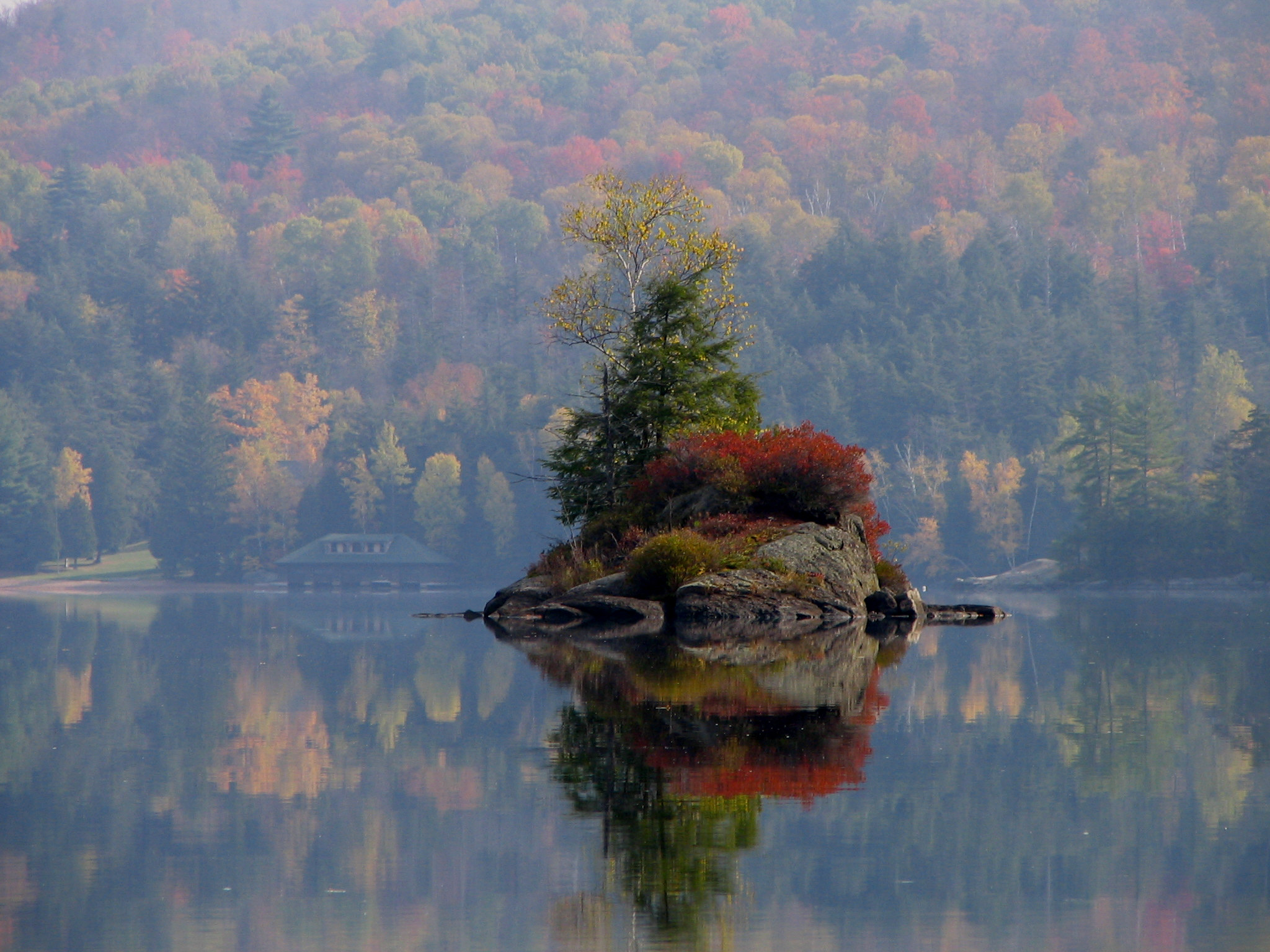
One of many small islands in Lower Saranac Lake

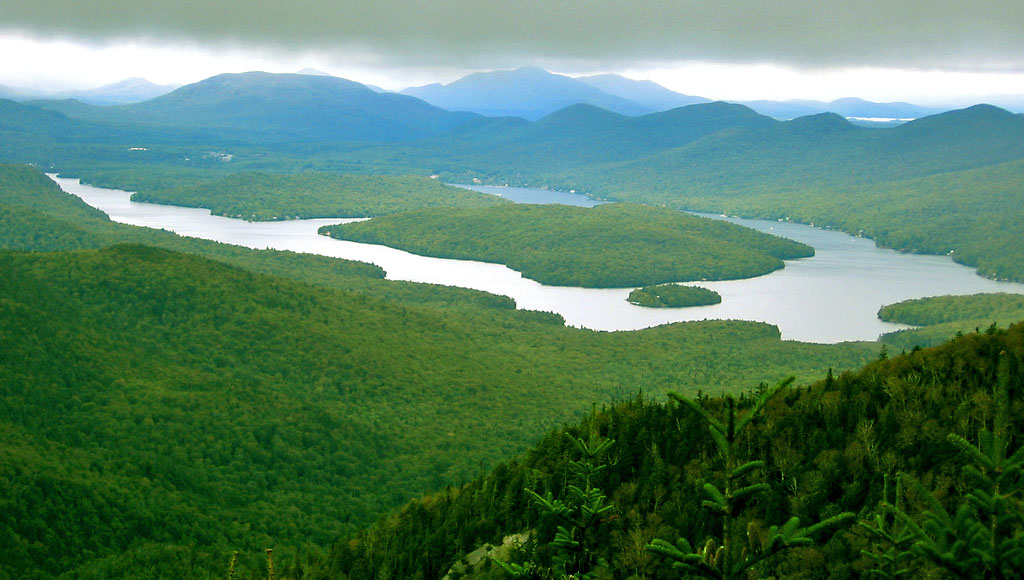
Lake Placid, from Whiteface Mountain; most of the islands and part of the south shore are part of the Wild Forest.

The Saranac Lakes Wild Forest is a discontinuous 79,000-acre (320 km^{2}) tract designated as Wild Forest by the New York State Department of Environmental Conservation in Franklin and Essex Counties near Saranac Lake, Tupper Lake, and Lake Placid. The area covers large portions of Harrietstown, Santa Clara, and North Elba; smaller portions are in Altamont, St. Armand, Brighton, and Franklin. The area is served by State Routes NY-3, NY-30, NY-86, and NY-73.

There are over 67,000 acres (270 km^{2}) of wild forest lands and nearly 19,000 acres (77 km^{2}) of water. There are 142 bodies of water including Upper, Middle, and Lower Saranac Lakes, Oseetah Lake, Lake Placid, Lake Clear, and Lake Colby; most of the shorelines of these bodies of these lakes are a mix of public and private land. Major rivers include the Raquette and Saranac Rivers.

Activities supported include hiking, snowmobiling, snowshoeing, skiing, mountain biking, canoeing, hunting, fishing, camping, swimming, mountain biking, cross-country skiing, snowshoeing, snowmobiling and bird watching.

Hiking options include 3,058-foot (932 m) Scarface Mountain, 2,516-foot (767 m) Boot Bay Mountain and 2,352-foot (717 m) Shingle Bay Mountain, 2,241-foot (683 m) Panther Mountain, the Fernow Nature Trail, and the Lake Placid Peninsula Nature Trails. There are over 50 miles (80 km) of marked trails, including about 26.5 miles (42.6 km) of snowmobile trails, 3.3 miles (5.3 km) of canoe carries, ten miles (16 km) of mountain bike trails, and 13 miles (21 km) of cross-country skiing trails.

There are nearly 250 designated campsites, including 90 in the Saranac Islands Campground on Weller Pond and Middle and Lower Saranac Lakes, eighteen on Upper Saranac Lake, 31 on Follensby Clear Pond, and sixteen along Floodwood Road, along with twelve lean-tos on several of the lakes, ponds, and rivers.

There are fifteen boat launches and fishing access sites, located on the Raquette River, Upper and Lower Saranac Lakes, Follensby Clear Pond, Second Pond, Lake Colby, Lake Placid, Lake Flower, Hoel Pond, East Pine Pond, Moose Pond, Little Green Pond, and Little Clear Pond.

== See also ==
- List of New York wild forests
