= Black Mountain (Washington County, New York) =

Mountain in Washington County, New York

- Location within New York

Highest point
- Elevation: 2640+ ft (805+ m) NGVD 29
- Prominence: 2,280 ft (690 m)
- Listing: New York County High Points 16th
- Coordinates: 43°36′23″N 73°31′51″W

Geography
- Location: Washington County, New York
- Parent range: Adirondack Mountains
- Topo map: USGS Shelving Rock

Black Mountain is a mountain located in Washington County, New York, of which its peak is the highest point. Isolated from the rest of the Adirondack Mountains by Lake George, Black Mtn. has the seventh highest topographic prominence of all the mountains in New York. Black Mountain also has the highest elevation of any of the peaks which surround Lake George and offers unobstructed views of the lake from its summit.

Black Mountain is within the Lake George Wild Forest and New York's 6.1 million acre Adirondack Park. It is part of the Adirondack Mountains, which have been dated to the Precambrian time – the Earth's earliest period of history—and range in age between ca. 1 to 1.35 billion years old.

On the top of Black Mountain is a weather station, a wind turbine, as well as a fire tower, which was decommissioned and fenced off in 1988 after 77 years of service by New York State fire observers and forest rangers. A well trafficked trail to the summit is the Black Mountain Summit Trail which is a 5.7 mile out and back trail located near Huletts Landing, New York which offers the chance to see wildlife and is rated as moderate, according to the hiking app AllTrails. The trail is primarily used for hiking, running, nature trips, and bird watching. Dogs are also able to use this trail but must be kept on leash.

The origin of the mountain's name is not conclusive. According to Thomas R. Lord in Stories of Lake George: Fact or Fiction the mountain was named after a violent thunderstorm and forest fire, which occurred in the 1600s, which left the entire mountain a charcoal black. A map of Washington County published in 1853 annotated the peak as Black Mountain although an earlier 1829 map did not name the peak.

John Frederick Kensett an American painter and a founder member of the Metropolitan Museum of Art in New York City included Black Mountain in a composition of Lake George in 1869 which is displayed at the Met.

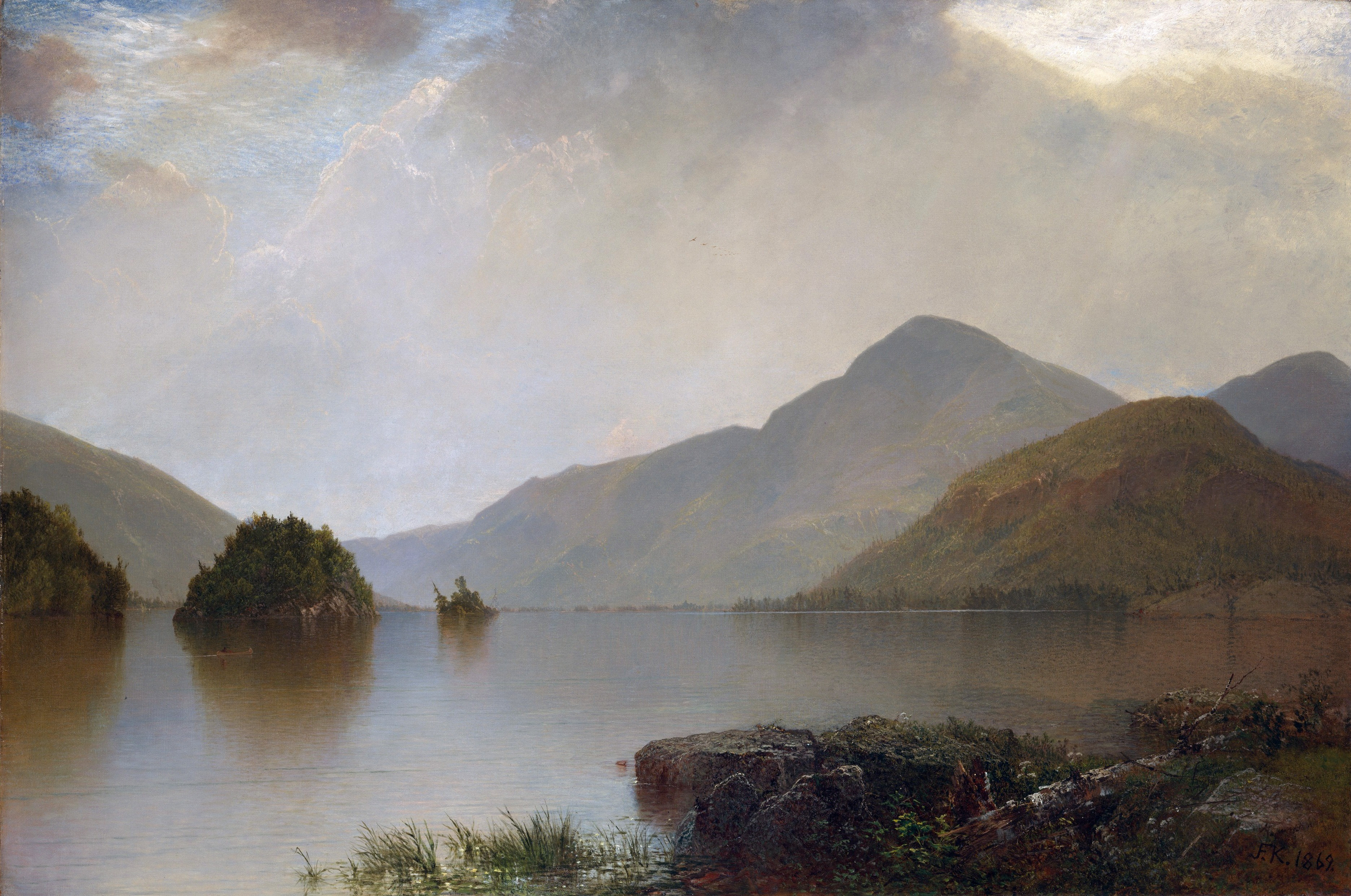
Kensett painting of Lake George and Black Mountain

The mountain stands within the watershed of Lake Champlain, thence into Canada's Richelieu River, the Saint Lawrence River, and into the Gulf of Saint Lawrence. The northwest and south sides of Black Mtn. drain into Lake George, thence into La Chute River, and Lake Champlain. The northeast side of Black Mtn. drains into Pike Brook, thence into the South Bay of Lake Champlain.

== History ==
In May 1911, the Conservation Commission built a wood fire lookout tower on the mountain. In 1918, the Conservation Commission replaced it with a 35-foot-tall (11 m) Aermotor LS40 steel tower. Due to increased use of aerial detection, the tower ceased fire lookout operations at the end of the 1988 fire season. In early 1989, the tower was officially closed by the New York State Department of Environmental Conservation. The tower is currently being used as a location for radio repeater antennas for various police agencies. The site is open to the public but the tower is closed off to the public.

Just north of the tower, is an etching on a rock that reads: "R. Rogers 1763". This was done by Robert Rogers of the colonial era "Rogers' Rangers" and has been authenticated by the New York State Education Department.

== Gallery ==
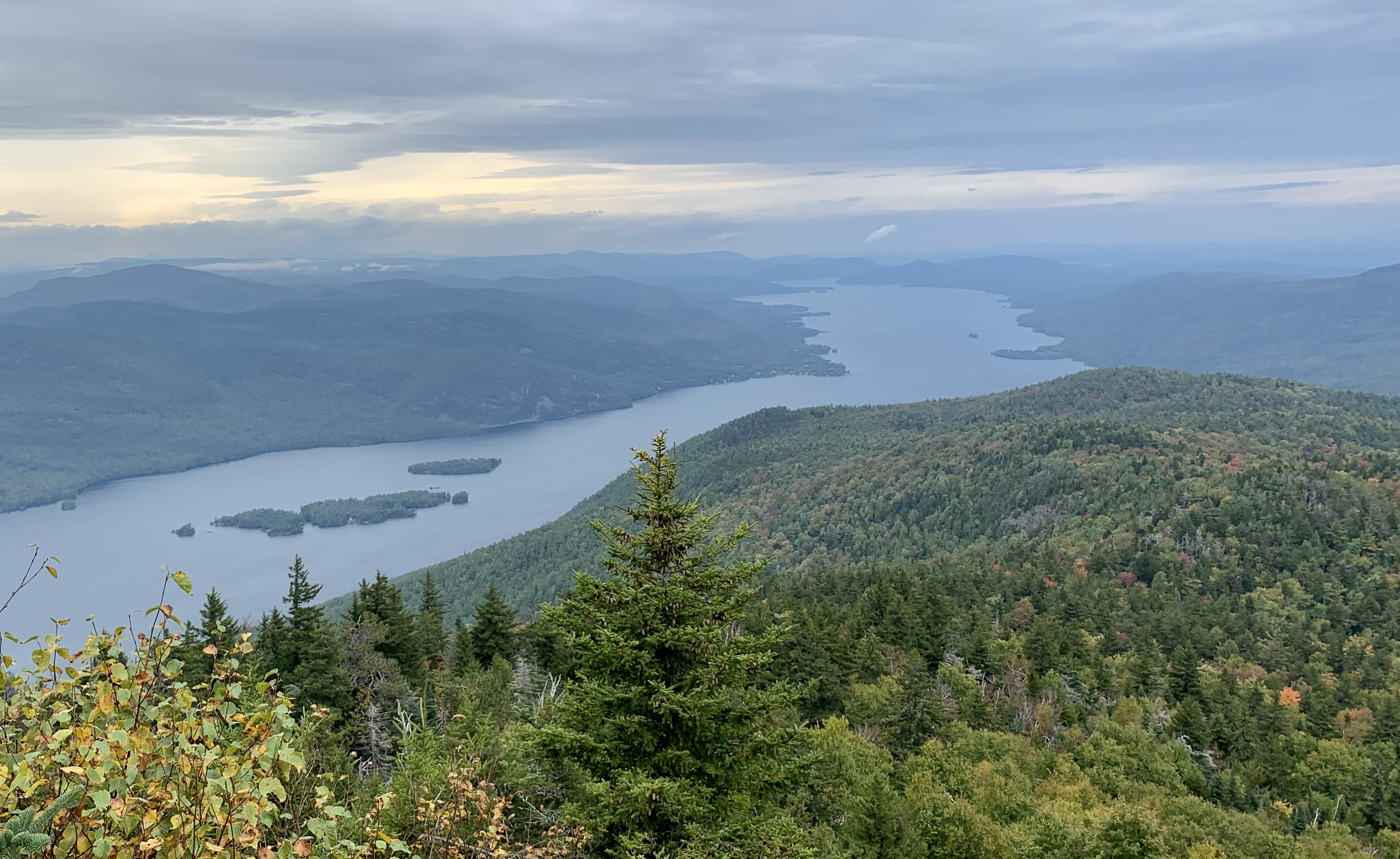
Looking north from the 2,640 foot summit of Black Mountain

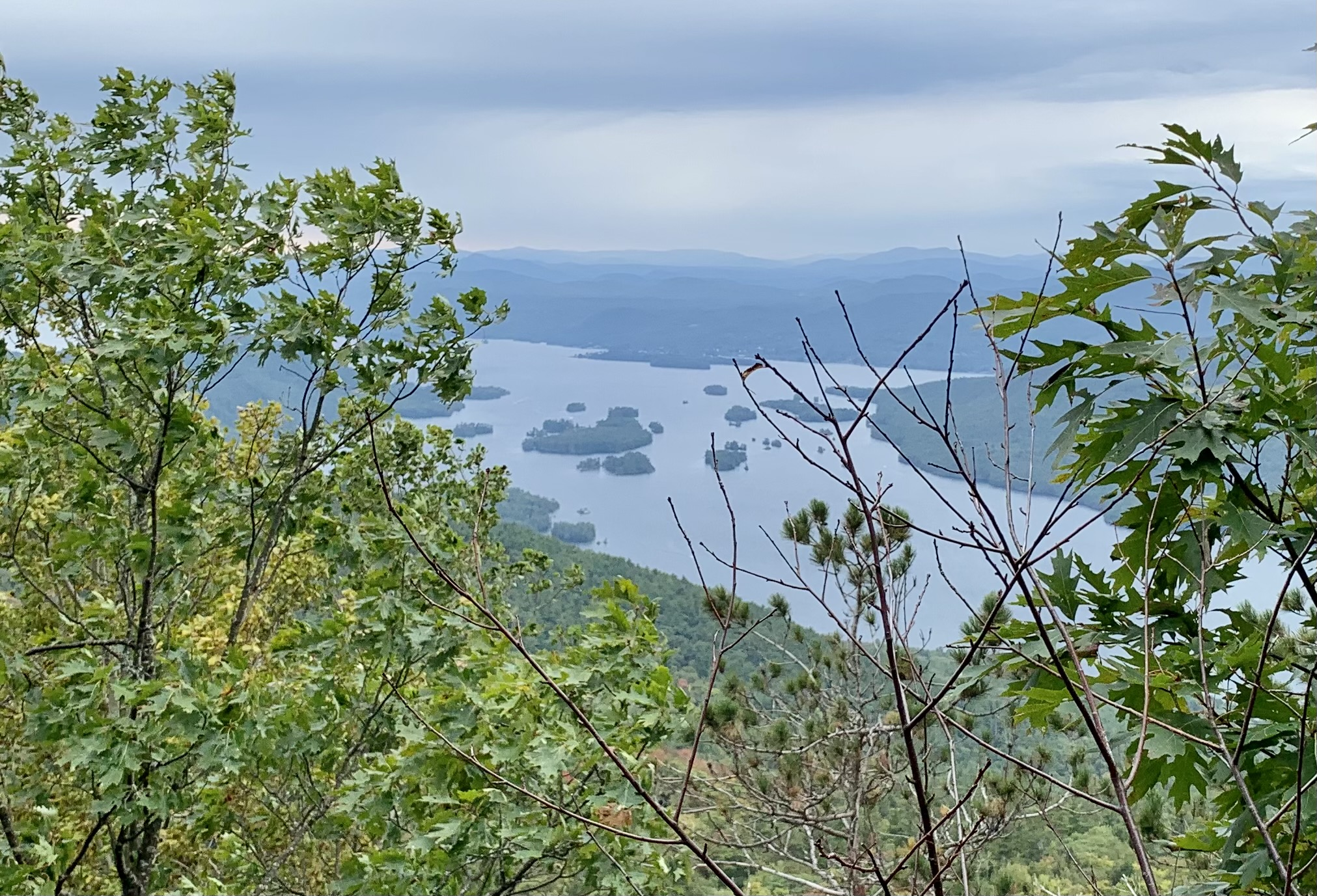
Looking South from near the 2,640 foot summit of Black Mountain

== See also ==
- List of mountains in New York
