= Lake George Wild Forest =

Coordinates: 43.64°N 73.58°W

The Lake George Wild Forest is a 71,133-acre (287.87 km^{2}) tract designated as Wild Forest by the New York State Department of Environmental Conservation in the southeastern Adirondacks in the towns of Bolton, Chester, Hague, Horicon, Lake George, Lake Luzerne, Queensbury, and Warrensburg, in Warren County, and the towns of Dresden, Fort Ann, and Putnam, in Washington County. It is bounded on the north by the Warren County line, on the west by the Hudson River, and on the south and east by the Adirondack Park boundary.

There are marked hiking trails to Black Mountain, Shelving Rock, Buck Mountain, Sleeping Beauty Mountain and Prospect Mountain.

There is camping at Lily Pond, Jabe Pond, Gay Pond and Palmer Pond, as well as 32-mile (51 km) long Lake George itself. The Lake George Wild Forest is a popular area for snowmobiling and ice fishing, and is linked with an extensive snowmobile trail network. The Hudson River Recreation Area of the Lake George Wild Forest offers flatwater paddling and boating along a historic waterway.

== See also ==
- List of New York wild forests
