= Wescott, Nebraska =

Unincorporated community in Nebraska, U.S.

Coordinates: 41°32′20″N 99°16′12″W

Wescott is an unincorporated community in Custer County, Nebraska, United States.

== History ==
Wescott was founded by Walter S. Wescott in 1886. A post office was established at Wescott in 1888, and remained in operation until it was discontinued in 1901.
