= List of New York wild forests =

Forest preserves in New York State

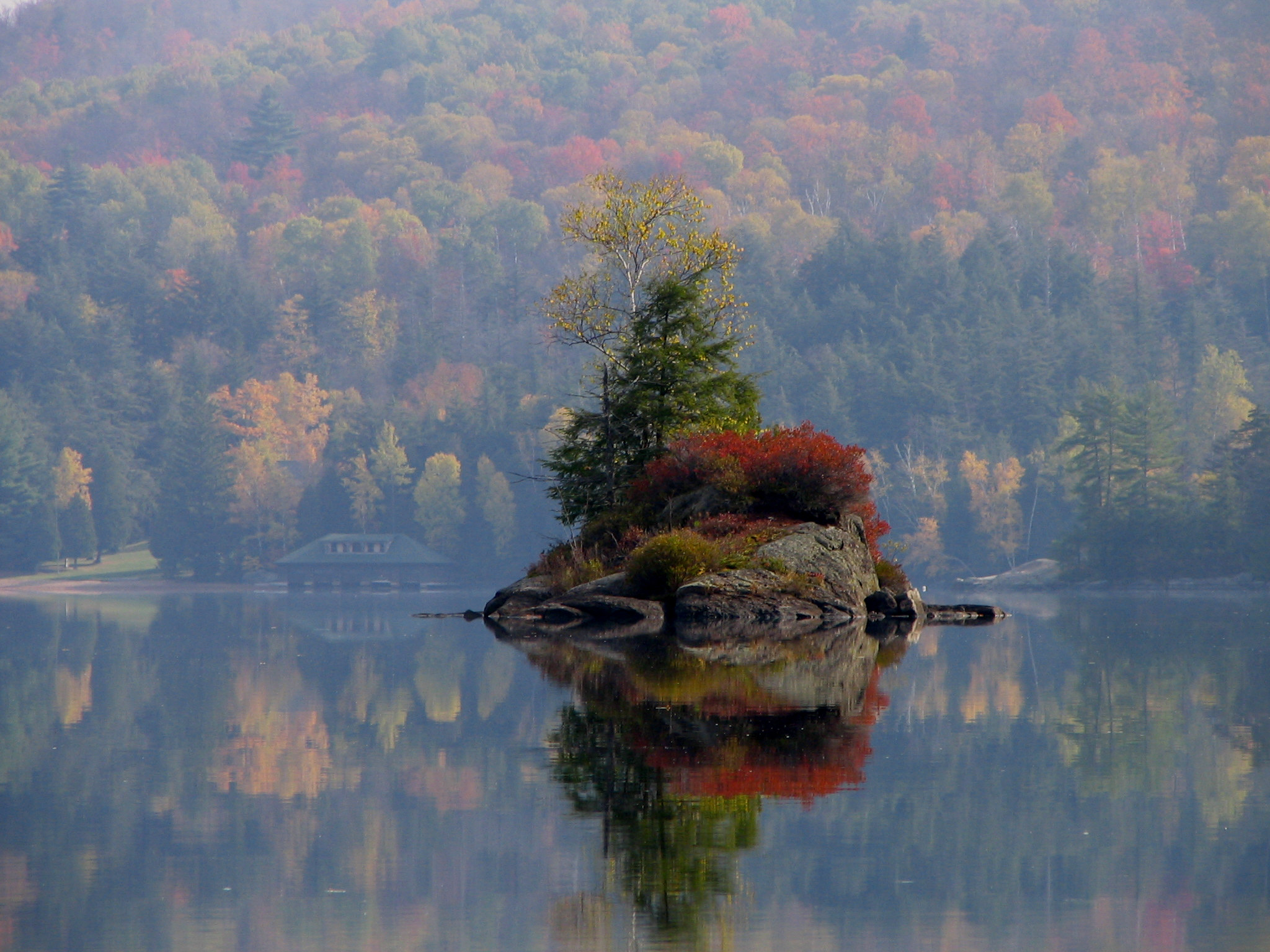
A small island in Lower Saranac Lake, part of Saranac Lakes Wild Forest.

Lands designated as "wild forest" in New York are managed by the New York State Department of Environmental Conservation as part of the Forest Preserve.

== Management ==
Wild forests are intended to retain an essentially wild and natural character, however management facilitates a greater amount of recreational use than areas designated by the state as wilderness, which feature an increased sense of remoteness and solitude. Most are located within the boundaries of Adirondack Park or Catskill Park.

== List of New York wild forests ==
Forest	County or counties	Park	Area	Notes
Aldrich Pond	Herkimer, St. Lawrence	Adirondack	26,702 acres (108.06 km^{2})	
Balsam Lake Mountain	Ulster	Catskill	13,500 acres (55 km^{2})	
Black River	Herkimer, Lewis, Oneida	Adirondack	121,506 acres (491.72 km^{2})	
Blue Mountain	Essex, Hamilton	Adirondack	37,800 acres (153 km^{2})	
Bluestone	Ulster	Catskill	2,895 acres (11.72 km^{2})	
Champlain Islands	Clinton, Essex	Adirondack	4 acres (0.016 km^{2})	Includes four small islands (Garden Island, Cole Island, Sheepshead Island, and Signal Buoy Island) in Lake Champlain.
Colgate Lake	Greene	Catskill	1,500 acres (6.1 km^{2})	
Cranberry Lake	St. Lawrence	Adirondack	24,111 acres (97.57 km^{2})	
Crystal Lake	Sullivan		497 acres (2.01 km^{2})	
Debar Mountain	Franklin	Adirondack	83,405 acres (337.53 km^{2})	
Delaware	Delaware	Catskill	27,800 acres (113 km^{2})	Created in 2008 through re-classification of Cherry Ridge-Campbell Mountain Wild Forest and Middle Mountain Wild Forest.
Dry Brook Ridge	Delaware, Ulster	Catskill	8,900 acres (36 km^{2})	
Elm Ridge	Greene	Catskill	1,355 acres (5.48 km^{2})	
Ferris Lake	Fulton, Hamilton, Herkimer	Adirondack	147,454 acres (596.73 km^{2})	
Fulton Chain	Herkimer	Adirondack	15,140 acres (61.3 km^{2})	
Grass River	St. Lawrence	Adirondack	1,274 acres (5.16 km^{2})	
Halcott Mountain	Greene	Catskill	4,760 acres (19.3 km^{2})	
Hammond Pond	Essex	Adirondack	45,558 acres (184.37 km^{2})	
Horseshoe Lake	Franklin, St. Lawrence	Adirondack	21,336 acres (86.34 km^{2})	
Independence River	Herkimer, Lewis	Adirondack	76,574 acres (309.88 km^{2})	
Jessup River	Hamilton	Adirondack	47,350 acres (191.6 km^{2})	
Kaaterskill	Ulster	Catskill	8,550 acres (34.6 km^{2})	
Lake George	Warren, Washington	Adirondack	71,133 acres (287.87 km^{2})	
Moose River Plains	Hamilton, Herkimer	Adirondack	64,322 acres (260.30 km^{2})	
Overlook Mountain	Ulster	Catskill	590 acres (2.4 km^{2})	
Phoenica	Ulster	Catskill	7,315 acres (29.60 km^{2})	
Raquette River	St. Lawrence	Adirondack	3,057 acres (12.37 km^{2})	
Rusk Mountain	Greene	Catskill	3,900 acres (16 km^{2})	
Saranac Lakes	Essex, Franklin	Adirondack	79,000 acres (320 km^{2})	
Sargent Ponds	Hamilton	Adirondack	49,768 acres (201.40 km^{2})	
Shaker Mountain	Fulton, Hamilton	Adirondack	40,500 acres (164 km^{2})	
Shandaken	Ulster, Greene	Catskill	5,376 acres (21.76 km^{2})	
Split Rock Mountain	Essex	Adirondack	3,383 acres (13.69 km^{2})	
Sundown	Sullivan, Ulster	Catskill	30,500 acres (123 km^{2})	
Taylor Pond	Clinton, Essex, Franklin	Adirondack	45,637 acres (184.69 km^{2})	
Vanderwhacker Mountain	Essex, Warren, Hamilton	Adirondack	91,854 acres (371.72 km^{2})	
Watson East Triangle	Herkimer, Lewis	Adirondack	13,417 acres (54.30 km^{2})	Also known as Watson's East Triangle Wild Forest.
White Hill	St. Lawrence	Adirondack	9,932 acres (40.19 km^{2})	
Wilcox Lake	Fulton, Hamilton, Saratoga, Warren	Adirondack	124,643 acres (504.41 km^{2})	
Willowemoc	Sullivan, Ulster	Catskill	15,900 acres (64 km^{2})	
Wilmington	Essex, Clinton	Adirondack	16,938 acres (68.55 km^{2})	

== See also ==
- Albany Pine Bush
- Long Island Central Pine Barrens
- Rome Sand Plains
