= Hiram Gabriel =

American politician

Hiram Gabriel (February 15, 1825 – February 5, 1918) was an American farmer and politician.

Born in Union County, Ohio, Gabriel moved to the town of York, Green County, Wisconsin Territory, in 1844, and settled in Stewart, Wisconsin. Gabriel was a farmer. Gabriel served in the 46th Wisconsin Volunteer Infantry Regiment during the American Civil War. Gabriel served as town assessor, town treasurer, and chairman of the York Town Board. In 1882 and 1883, Gabriel served in the Wisconsin State Assembly as a Republican. Gabriel died in Madison, Wisconsin.
