= Farmers Grove, Wisconsin =

- Ghost town
- Location within Wisconsin
- Coordinates: 42°47′06″N 89°43′27″W
- Country: United States
- State: Wisconsin
- County: Green
- Town: York
- Elevation: 1,109 ft (338 m)
- GNIS feature ID: 2760449

Farmers Grove is a ghost town in the town of York, Green County, Wisconsin, United States.

== Notable people ==
- Elisha T. Gardner, Wisconsin lawyer, legislator, and businessman, owned a store in Farmers Grove.
