= William Comstock Green =

American politician

William Comstock Green (August 26, 1802 – August 3, 1874) was an American politician.

Born in Berlin, New York, Green moved to the town of York, Wisconsin Territory, in 1840. He served in the first Wisconsin Constitutional Convention of 1846 as a Democrat. Then, Green served in the Wisconsin State Assembly in 1850. He was elected the Green County, Wisconsin superintendent of schools serving from 1861 to 1867. He died in Monroe, Wisconsin in 1874.
