= Henry Adams (Wisconsin politician) =

American politician

Member of the Wisconsin Senate
- In office 1867–1868

Member of the Wisconsin Assembly
- In office 1848–1848

Personal details
- Born: April 30, 1811 Bedford County, Pennsylvania
- Died: July 30, 1871 (aged 60)
- Spouse: Sarah Mills
- Children: 10

Henry Adams (April 30, 1811 - July 30, 1871) was a Green County, Wisconsin, farmer who served as a member of the Wisconsin State Assembly and the Wisconsin State Senate, as well as holding various local offices.

== Background ==
Adams was born on April 30, 1811, in Bedford County, Pennsylvania. He married Sarah Mills, likewise a Bedford County native, and they remained there for some time before moving to Coshocton County, Ohio, where they lived until leaving for Wisconsin in 1845. They started a farm of 160 acres in what would become Mount Pleasant, Green County, Wisconsin.

== Public office ==
Adams soon became active in public affairs.

=== County and township offices ===
In 1847 he was elected one of the county's three county commissioners. After statehood, in June 1849 he was chairman of the town board for Mount Pleasant, and thus ex officio a member of the county board of supervisors, remaining in that position until November 1851. He returned to the board for the November 1853 session, being elected board chairman. In 1856, Adams was an unsuccessful candidate for county register of deeds. From 1861, state law reduced the county board to three supervisors. Adams was elected from the first district (the Towns of New Glarus, York, Exeter, Brooklyn, Washington and Mount Pleasant) in 1861, and re-elected in 1863. (He also served as assessor and justice of the peace for the township.)

=== State office ===
Upon statehood, he was elected to the Green County seat in the State Assembly for the 1st Wisconsin Legislature as a Democrat, with 469 votes to 398 for John W. Stewart. He was not a candidate for re-election, and was succeeded by John C. Crawford, a Whig. In 1853, he ran for Wisconsin's 24th State Senate district, losing to Francis H. West, a Democrat who in the next session would join the newly-organized Republican Party. In 1859, he ran against old opponent John Stewart (now a Republican) for the vacant Senate seat (Republican incumbent John H. Warren was not a candidate), losing with 1175 votes to Stewart's 1633. In 1865, he won the Senate seat as a National Union candidate, with 1,517 votes to 746 for H. T. Pearson. He was re-elected in 1867 as a Republican, with 2,064 votes to 1,112 for a "Mr. Passmore" (first name unknown). He was not a candidate for re-election in 1869 (having moved to Hardin County, Iowa), and was succeeded by "Independent Republican" John C. Hall.

=== Civic organizations ===
In addition to governmental offices, he served as an officer of the Green County Agricultural Society, and as a trustee for the Monticello Cemetery.

== Leaving and returning to Green County ==
The Adams' sold their farm in 1868 and moved to Hardin County, Iowa, but soon returned to Green County, settling in Monroe, where they lived until Henry died on July 13, 1871. They had had ten children, eight still living at the time of his death.
