= New York State Department of Environmental Conservation =

New York's state-level environmental regulator

- Seal

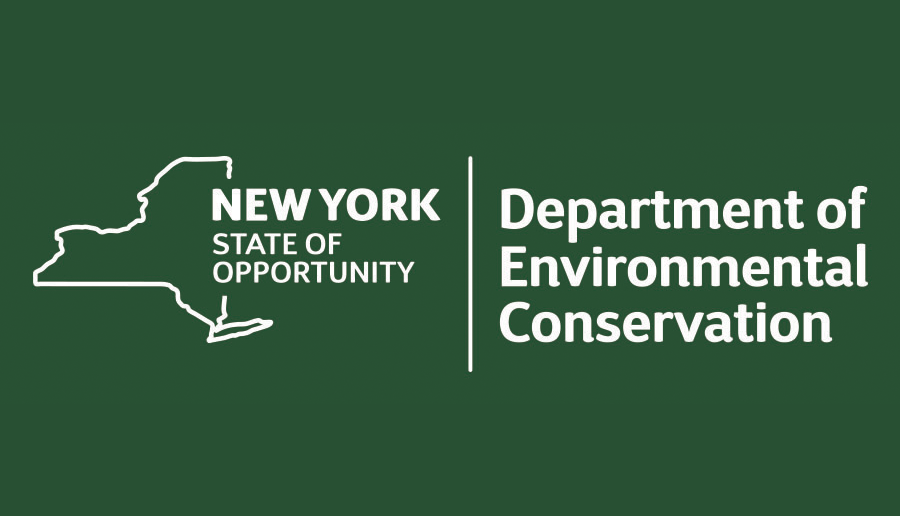
- Logo

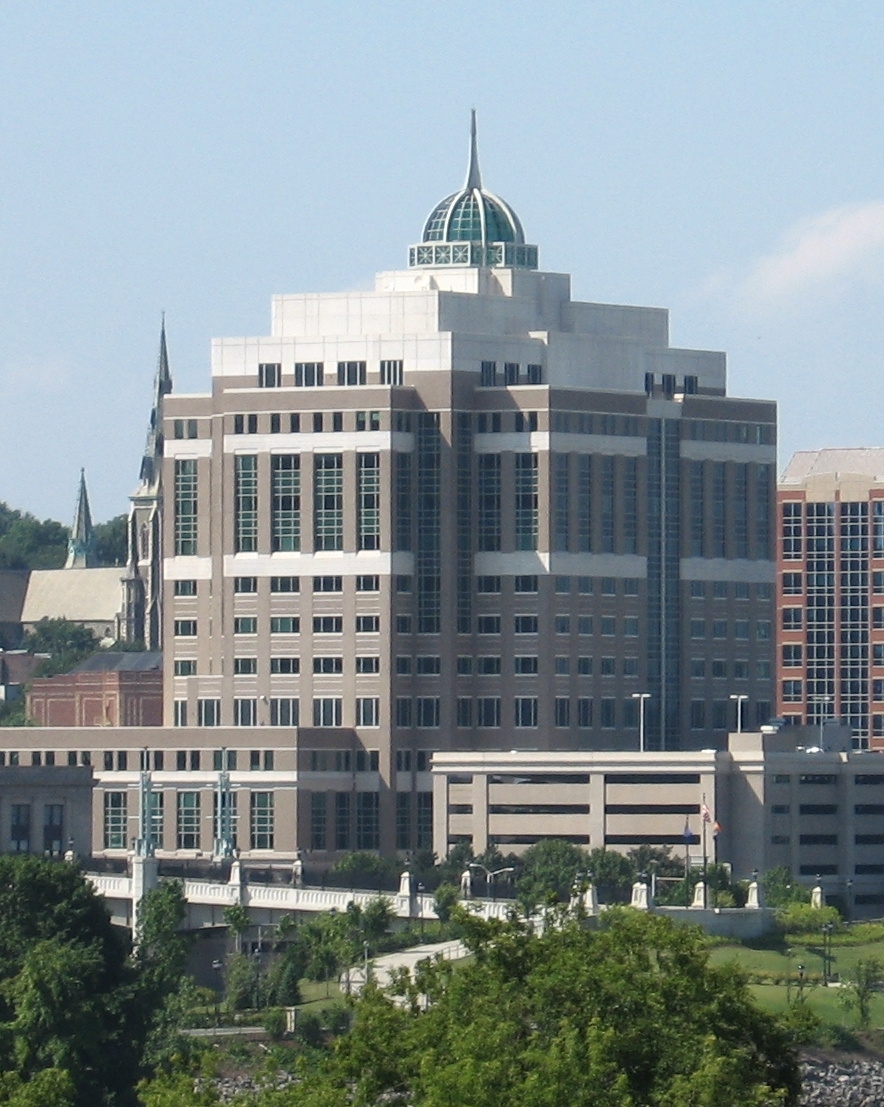
- DEC Headquarters in Albany

Department overview
- Formed: April 22, 1970
- Preceding agencies: New York Fisheries Commission; New York Forest Commission; New York Fisheries, Game and Forest Commission; New York Forest, Fish and Game Commission; New York Conservation Commission; New York Conservation Department
- Jurisdiction: New York
- Headquarters: 625 Broadway, Albany, New York
- Employees: 3,000
- Annual budget: $2.5 billion (FY 2024)
- Department executive: Amanda Lefton, Commissioner
- Key document: Environmental Conservation Law
- Website: dec.ny.gov

The New York State Department of Environmental Conservation (informally referred to as NYSDEC, DEC, EnCon or NYSENCON) is a department of New York state government. The department guides and regulates the conservation, improvement, and protection of New York's natural resources; manages Forest Preserve lands in the Adirondack and Catskill parks, state forest lands, and wildlife management areas; regulates sport fishing, hunting and trapping; and enforces the state's environmental laws and regulations. Its regulations are compiled in Title 6 of the New York Codes, Rules and Regulations. It was founded in 1970, replacing the Conservation Department, and is headed by Amanda Lefton.

NYS DEC had an annual budget of about $2,588 million for FY 2024, and employs roughly 3,000 people across New York State. It manages over four million acres (16,000 km^{2}) of protected state-owned land and another 910,000 acres (3,700 km^{2}) of privately owned land on which it holds conservation easements. The department's activities go beyond land management and environmental enforcement to include the publication of a magazine and a state bird atlas, and the operation of 52 campgrounds in the Adirondack and Catskill Parks.

== History ==
=== Predecessor agencies ===
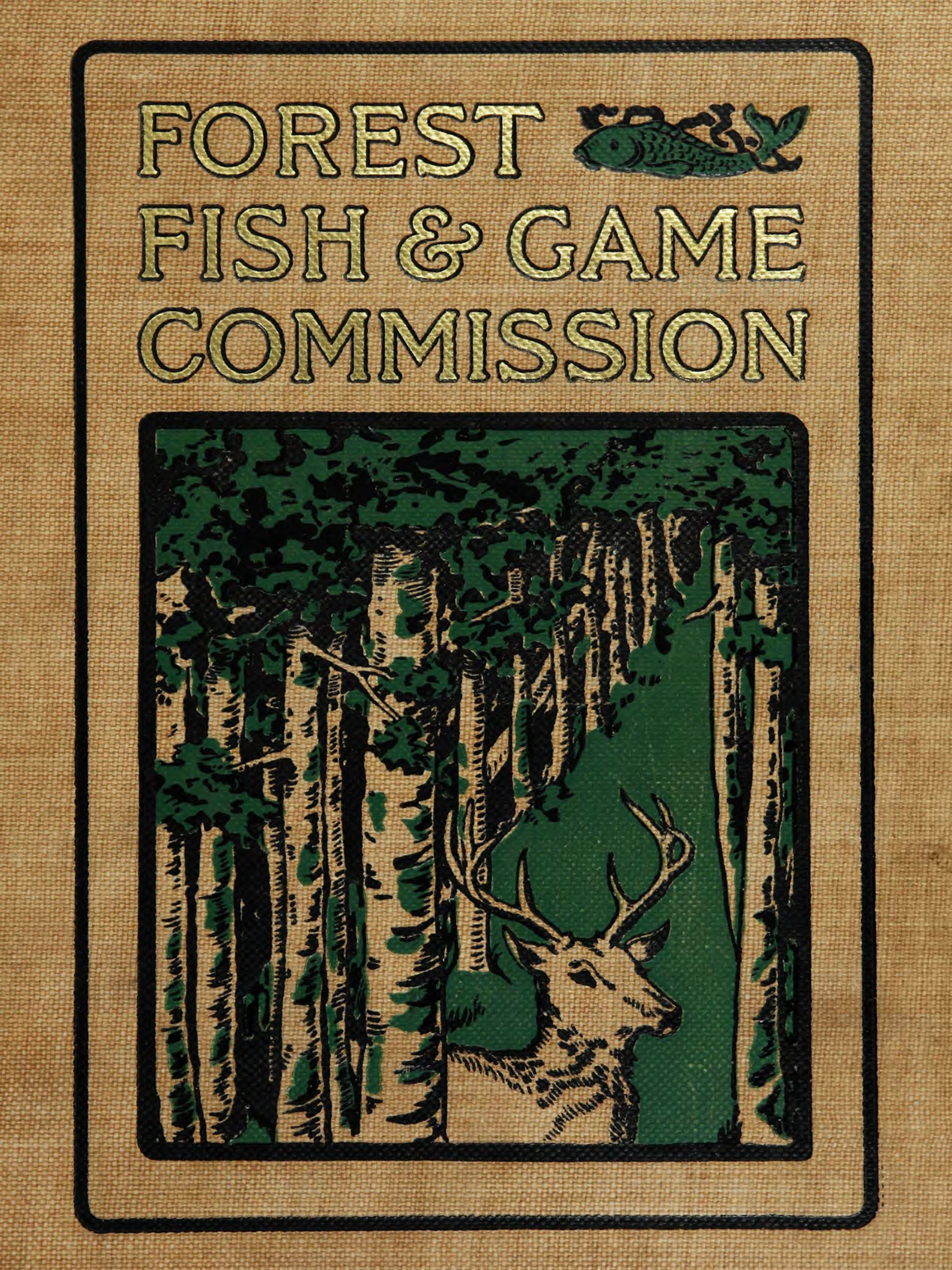
Cover of the Sixth Annual Report of the Forest, Fish and Game Commission (1901), detailing the activities of one of the NYS DEC's predecessor agencies

Many of the specific functions of today's DEC began as tasks carried out by individual commissions or agencies created for those specific purposes. These smaller entities merged over time to create today's department, which was officially created in 1970.

The earliest New York state commission dedicated to natural resources was a three-member Fisheries Commission established in 1868. The Forest Commission, set up in 1885 and revised in 1893, was established to oversee the newly created Forest Preserve in the Adirondacks and Catskills, in addition to management of other forests, tree plantings, and forest fires elsewhere in the state. A Forest Preserve Board was also established in 1897, charged with purchasing new state lands for conservation. The Fisheries Commission and the Forest Commission were merged to form the Fisheries, Game, and Forest Commission in 1895; it was renamed the Forest, Fish, and Game Commission in 1900.

Protection of New York's water resources by a state agency began in 1902 with the establishment of the Water Storage Commission, which became the Water Supply Commission in 1905. The new Water Supply Commission also absorbed the River Improvement Commission that had been created in 1904. The Water Supply Commission's duties focused on ensuring adequate water was available for New York's cities, towns, and villages.

In 1911, the Water Supply Commission, the Forest Preserve Board, and the Forest, Fish, and Game Commission were combined to create the Conservation Commission, which was headed by three commissioners charged with managing inland waters, lands and forests, and fish and game, respectively.

The Conservation Commission became the Conservation Department in 1926, following a major re-organization of New York State's government. The new Conservation Department also absorbed the duties of the Water Power Commission (created in 1921) and the Water Control Commission (created in 1922), which were established to monitor the state's hydro-power resources and regulate water flow. The new department also included a Division of Parks, which was made senior to the State Council of Parks that had been established in 1924 to oversee New York's state parks and historic sites outside of the Forest Preserve.

=== Origin ===
The New York State Department of Environmental Conservation was created in 1970 by legislation symbolically signed on the first Earth Day by then-Governor Nelson Rockefeller. The new department was charged with the functions of the former Conservation Department, in addition to the duties of several programs previously part of the New York State Department of Health and other commissions; several brand-new offices were created as well.

The same legislation relieved the new department of the duties of the former Conservation Department's Division of Parks; the jurisdiction of the former division instead became the independent New York State Office of Parks, Recreation and Historic Preservation.

=== 1970s ===
In its first decade, it took the lead in helping the state comply with newly passed federal environmental legislation. DEC's work at Love Canal helped draw national attention to the problems posed by hazardous waste sites. It also worked to end General Electric's discharge of PCBs into the Hudson River, an issue that continues into the present day. It implemented New York's first state-level endangered species list.

DEC also was put in charge of reviewing declarations filed under the State Environmental Quality Review Act (SEQRA), which mirrors federal laws. In 1972, voters approved the Environmental Quality Bond Act, which continues to provide funds for land acquisition, solid waste aid, sewage treatment, air pollution control and resource recovery. Its renewal in 1986 made possible remediation of many hazardous waste sites.

=== 1980s ===
In the 1980s, DEC was given regulatory authority over storage, transportation, treatment and disposal of hazardous wastes. In this capacity, it helped New York end disposal of radioactive waste at West Valley. The legislature also passed a bottle bill, to be enforced and administered by DEC. The department's facilities at Whiteface Mountain and Mount Van Hoevenberg near Lake Placid were venues for several events at the 1980 Winter Olympic Games.

The decade also saw the department complete, with considerable volunteer help, New York's Atlas of Breeding Birds, a mammoth, exhaustive tome of great interest to birders and ornithologists. DEC efforts have also led to the restoration of several species in the state, including the bald eagle.

The state also began allowing its taxpayers to return a Gift to Wildlife on their income tax forms, providing money directly to DEC for conservation programs.

=== 1990s ===
DEC actions against New York City led to a consent order requiring the city to operate the Fresh Kills landfill under its regulations, which led to its eventual closure. New York has seen an 80% reduction in its operating landfills since 1984. The department also obtained a memorandum of understanding with the city that eventually led to both tougher land-use regulations in the watersheds of its upstate reservoirs and economic development funds for the communities in them.

The 90 mile (140 km) Genesee Valley Greenway was created during this time on abandoned railbed and Genesee Valley Canal property. A new source of funding was opened up when the legislature created the state's Environmental Protection Fund.

The decade that saw New York come under its first Republican administration in 16 years had some worried that DEC would become more submissive to business interests. But the department remained active, taking the lead in establishing the state's Open Space Plan for future land acquisitions.

=== 2000–2005 ===
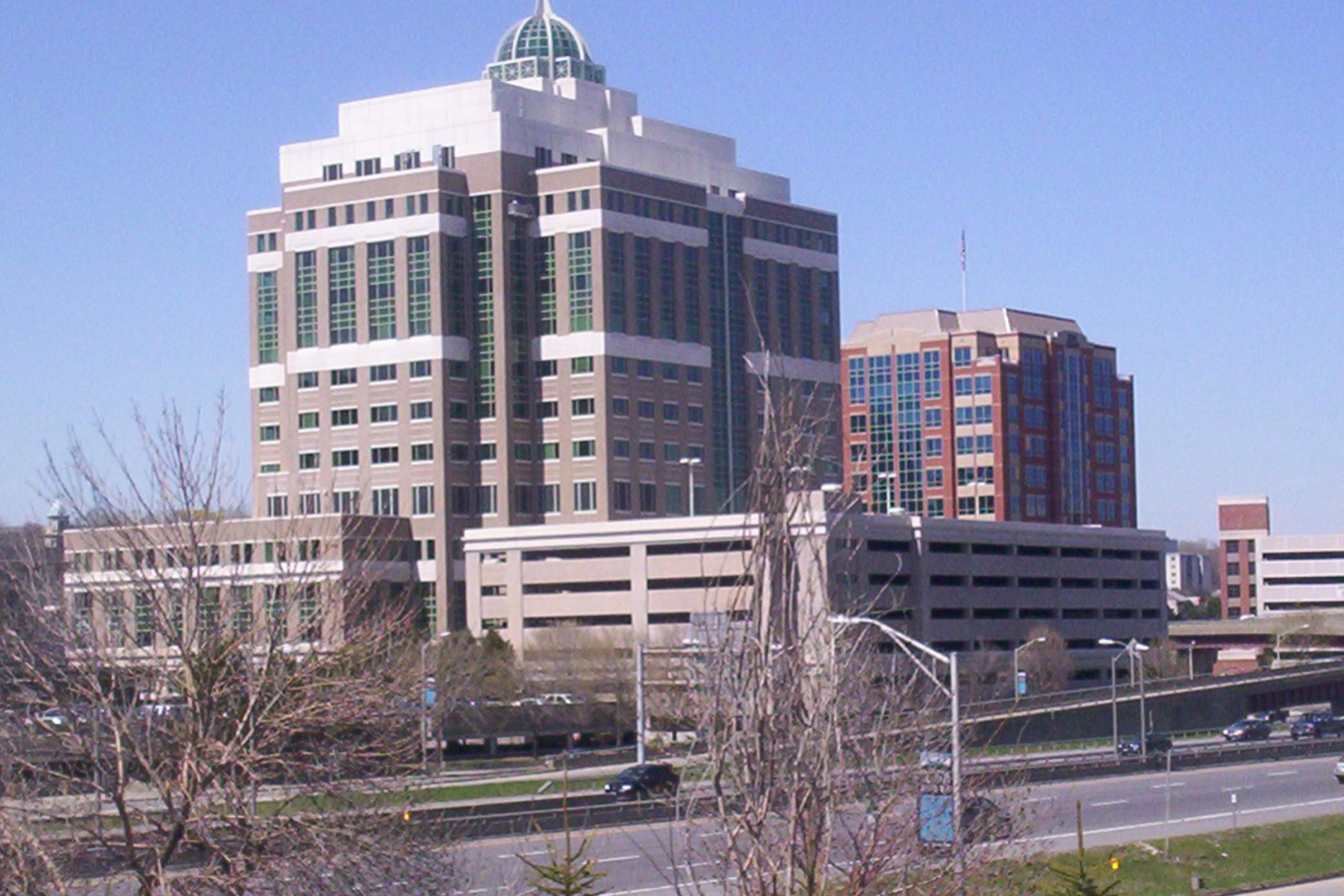
DEC's Headquarters in Albany

The summer of 2001 brought a major change to the department. Since its inception in 1970 the department's headquarters (central office) had been at 50 Wolf Road in Colonie, NY (the current headquarters of the New York State Department of Transportation). In the late 1990s then Gov. George Pataki decided the department needed a new home with views of the Hudson River. He authorized funding to build a new office tower at 625 Broadway in downtown Albany. The building was completed in April 2001 and by late August the approximately 1,500 central office DEC staff had been relocated to the new facility.

DEC employees were active in the cleanup after the September 11, 2001, terrorist attacks in New York City.

As part of the refinancing and reform the State Superfund Program in 2003, New York created the Brownfield Cleanup Program to mitigate threats to public health and the environment from contaminated sites. The initiative also the redevelopment of abandoned, contaminated properties to revitalize economically blighted communities. Additional regulations enacted in 2009 further improved New York's site remediation/redevelopment process.

Under the Waste Tire Management and Recycling Act of 2003, DEC developed a plan to manage and recycle used and discarded tires, and address non-complaint waste tire dumps in the state, which had an estimated 18-20 million scrap tires.

New York proposed and led the effort to create the Regional Greenhouse Gas Initiative (RGGI), a cap-and-trade program among seven northeastern states to lower carbon dioxide (CO_{2}) emissions, a major contributor to global warming. RGGI was the first mandatory, market-based cap-and-trade program for CO_{2} emission in U.S. history, and has grown to include nine states.

=== 2006–2010 ===
In 2006, the DEC started an investigation of Camp O'Ryan, the former New York Army National Guard training range in Wethersfield, New York. The concerns at this site included lead contamination from spent bullets, as well as alleged witnessed burial of cylinders of unknown origin. As of that date, DEC was contacting the New York State Division of Military and Naval Affairs and United States Army Corps of Engineers for further information about the range.

DEC created the Pollution Prevention Institute (P2I) in 2008 at the Rochester Institute of Technology (RIT) to bring together academic institutions, not-for-profit institutions and government entities to encourage and support the development of sustainable businesses and organizations, and reduce natural resource consumption and waste.

New York achieved its goal of conserving one million acres of open space, including critical forested lands in the Adirondack and Catskills mountains that are now open to outdoor recreation.

=== 2011–2015 ===
Under New York's Sewage Pollution Right to Know (SPRTK) law, publicly owned sewage systems and treatment works are required to report untreated and partially treated sewage discharges to DEC within two hours of the discharge, and also alert the public and adjoining municipalities of discharges within four hours.

DEC, in conjunction with other New York State agencies, updated safety procedures and emergency response preparedness associated with the transport of crude oil by train, reducing the risks of spills that could threaten communities and natural resources.

DEC's Division of Law Enforcement (DLE) conducts investigations, including sting operations, to enforce a 2014 state law that banned the sale of elephant and mammoth ivory and rhinoceros horns in New York. The law was designed to enhance global protection for critical animal populations. In 2014, DEC conducted a joint investigation with the U.S. Fish and Wildlife Service and the Manhattan District Attorney's office that led to the seizure of elephant ivory worth more than $8.5 million from jewelers based in New York City.

Following extensive reviews by DEC and the NYS Department of Health, DEC issued a findings statement in 2015 that prohibited high-volume hydraulic fracturing (fracking) in New York.

=== 2016–2020 ===
DEC facilitated the State's acquisition and protection of more than 65,000 acres of forested lands in the Adirondacks, including the Essex Chain of Lakes, OK Slip Falls, and Boreas Ponds. The 20,758-acre Boreas Ponds Tract, purchased in the spring of 2016, will be open to the public for the first time.

DEC and the State Department of Health (DOH) are members of the New York's Water Quality Rapid Response Team, created in 2016 to evaluate drinking water supply threats across the state, assist communities with water testing and provide technical assistance to ensure universal access to clean drinking water.

In 2016, DEC mobilized a massive response to address PFOA contamination in Hoosick Falls, The agency engaged its workforce and contractors to install hundreds of water filtration systems in homes and a filter system at the towns water treatment facility. The agency is also mobilized to ensure safe drinking water in Newburgh, following the discovery of perfluorooctanesulfonic acid (PFOS) in city drinking water.

Under New York's $2.5 billion Clean Water Infrastructure Act (CWIA) of 2017, DEC is assisting municipal efforts to upgrade drinking water and wastewater treatment facilities and residential septic systems, and mitigate drinking water contamination.

New York State's Environmental Protection Fund (EPF), created in 1993, supports a variety of DEC programs, including open space conservation, invasive species control, the Hudson River Estuary Program, Albany Pine Bush and Long Island Central Pine Barrens, state and municipal parks, and other environmental resource protections. The EPF has been fully funded at $300M annually since 2016.

DEC is overseeing efforts to clean up contamination at the Naval Weapons Industrial Reserve Plant in Bethpage, New York, including a $150 million to install wells and treatments facilities to contain and cleanup contamination on the 600-acre site.

DEC's Division of Marine Resources plays a key role in developing new reefs off the coast of Long Island as part of New York's Artificial Reef Program. Hundreds of tons of clean, recycled materials, including former girders from the former Tappan Zee Bridge, were strategically placed to settle on the sea floor, creating habitat similar to natural reefs that will attract fish and marine life and expand opportunities for fishing and diving.

=== 2024–2025 ===
On October 30, 2024, DEC seized a squirrel by the name of Peanut and a raccoon from a Pine City house on the basis that it is illegal to keep young wildlife as pets. (Note: It is illegal in New York to keep young wildlife as pets since the animals become too accustomed to and dependent on humans to thrive in the wild; DEC recommends those who take in injured wild animals to turn them over to certified wildlife rehabilitators.) The DEC euthanized the animals in order to test them for rabies, claiming that the squirrel bit a member of DEC staff in the process of being seized. Testing for rabies requires taking brain sections and cannot be done to a living animal. While squirrels rarely contract rabies, raccoons are known vectors and subject to even stricter regulation.

The DEC's involvement and handling of Peanut's case, combined with the animal's popular public persona, elicited widespread public criticism. Threats of violence against the DEC and its employees followed, including bomb threats issued to various DEC Offices across the state.

The Climate Change Superfund Act was enacted in December 2024 and the department was made responsible for the Climate Change Adaptation Cost Recovery Program.

== Organization ==
The Department of Environmental Conservation is headed by a commissioner appointed by the governor. The commissioner reports to the deputy secretary for the environment. Below the commissioner and deputy commissioners are the heads of all offices, divisions, and regional directors. Basil Seggos, who stepped down in April of 2024, was the longest serving commissioner of the New York State Department of Environmental Conservation, having been appointed by New York State Governor Andrew Cuomo in 2015. The current commissioner is Amanda Lefton.

The department has 12 offices: Administration; Air Resources, Climate Change & Energy; Communications; General Counsel; Hearings and Mediation Services; Internal Audit and Investigation; Legislative Affairs; Natural Resources; Public Protection; Regional Affairs and Permitting; Remediation and Materials Management; and Water Resources. Many of these offices have internal divisions with specific responsibilities.

Office of Administration

There are three divisions within this office:

- Division of Operations: According to its mission statement, this division "provide(s) technical services, facilities management, and maintenance of physical assets to insure effective and efficient operation of the Department and safe public use of DEC lands and facilities." In practice this means its primary responsibility is operating DEC-owned recreational facilities such as the DEC's 52 campgrounds in the Adirondack and Catskill Parks. Other responsibilities include managing DEC's extensive vehicle fleet and all departmental facilities. It also houses DEC's internal design and construction shop.
- Division of Management and Budget: Handles all personnel, internal accounting and bookkeeping activities.
- Office of Employee Relations: Handles all relations between DEC and the several unions which represent its employees.

Office of Air Resources, Climate Change & Energy

- Division of Air Resources: Oversees all air quality-related programs
- Office of Climate Change

Office of General Counsel

This is DEC's legal office.

- Program and Regional Counsel
- Freedom Of Information Law (FOIL)
- Environmental Justice

Office of Hearings and Mediation Services

This office administers all DEC public hearings and enforcement hearings. It also considers all appeals of denials of requests under New York's Freedom of Information Law.

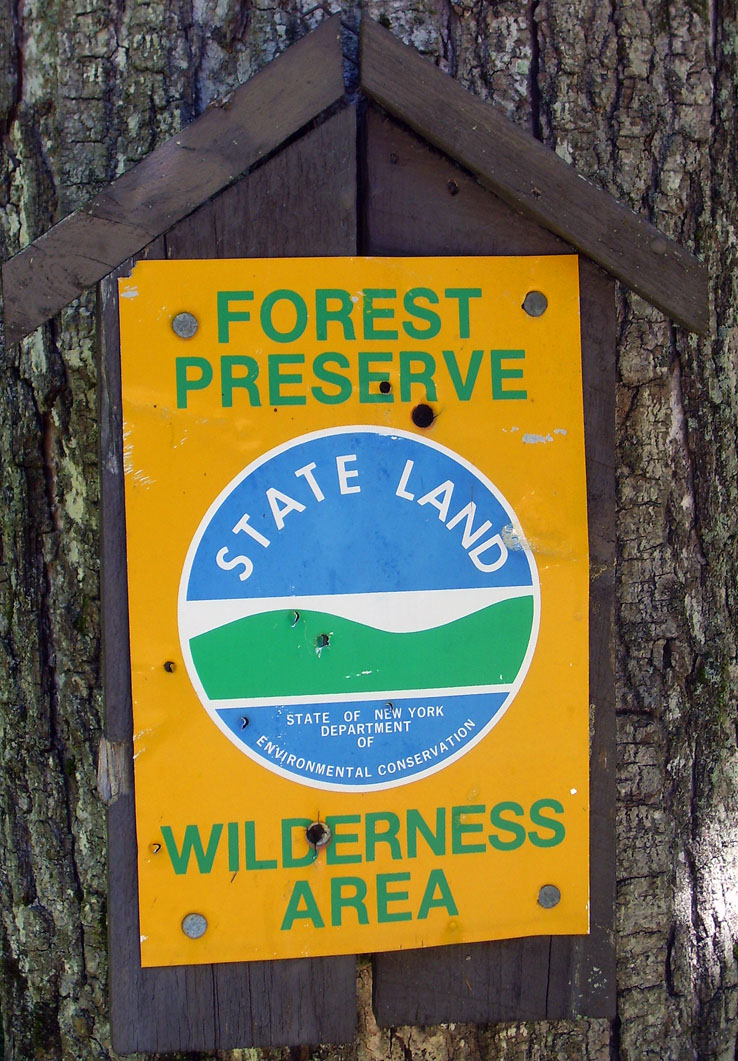
DEC sign marking state-land boundary.

Office of Internal Audit and Investigation

Office of Legislative Affairs

This office serves to "build and maintain positive working relationships with Legislators and their staffs in order to encourage dialogue and cooperation on matters affecting environmental policy. OLA is charged to present, discuss, and gain passage of the Department's annual legislative program. OLA also serves as a liaison between elected officials and the Department on concerns and issues affecting their constituents."

Office of Natural Resources

This office handles most of DEC's conservation-related functions.

- Division of Fish and Wildlife: Oversees hunting, fishing and trapping licenses, and monitors the quality of those resources. Manages state wildlife management areas. Oversees freshwater wetlands programs.
- Division of Marine Resources: Manages living marine resources and their habitats within the Marine and Coastal District of New York State.
- Division of Lands and Forests: Responsible for the management, protection and recreational use of about four million acres (16,000 km^{2}) of state owned land or 13 percent of the land area of New York State. Lands and Forests is also responsible for public recreation rights on roughly 910,000 acres (3,000 km^{2}) of Conservation easement lands. One of the largest divisions in terms of scope.

Office of Public Affairs

- Division of Communication, Education, and Engagement: Responsible for all public outreach efforts, including the New York State Conservationist magazine and the department's website.
- Press Office

Office of Public Protection

This office houses the two uniformed law enforcement agencies under DEC's aegis.

- Division of Forest Protection: New York State Forest Rangers.
- Division of Law Enforcement: Environmental Conservation Officers, known as ECOs for short, are the oldest state-level police agency in New York, having evolved from the state's game wardens in the late 19th century. Today they not only handle those responsibilities but enforce other environmental laws as well.
- Emergency Response Coordination Unit

Office of Regional Affairs and Permitting

- Division of Environmental Permits
- Regions 1-9 Administration

Office of Remediation and Materials Management

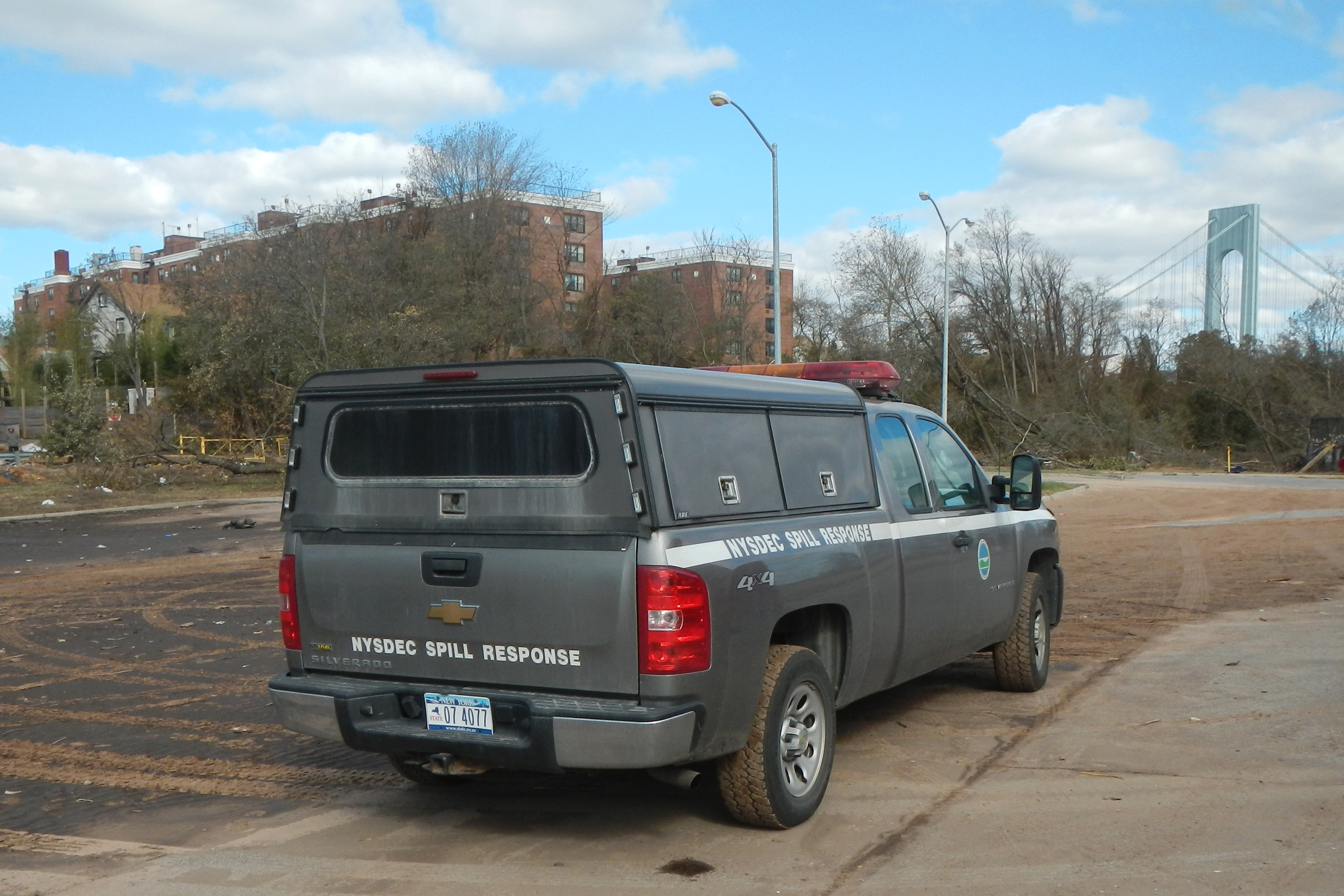
NYS DEC Spill Response vehicle at South Beach, Staten Island after Hurricane Sandy

- Division of Environmental Remediation: Administers cleanup efforts, spill response and brownfield redevelopment.
- Division of Mineral Resources: Oversees all programs related to mining and oil and gas exploration (New York has 12,600 active wells).
- Division of Materials Management: Oversees all programs related to waste management and the manufacture, transport and disposal of hazardous material.

Office of Water Resources

- Division of Water : Oversees all water quality and flood control programs on the state's 52,337 miles (84,210 km) of rivers; 7,849 lakes; 2.5 million acres (10,000 km^{2}) of freshwater wetlands and 25,000 acres (100 km^{2}) of tidal wetlands. Oversees the Coastal Erosion Hazard Area [CEHA] program.
- Hudson River Estuary Program
- Great Lakes Program
- New York City Watershed

== Regions ==

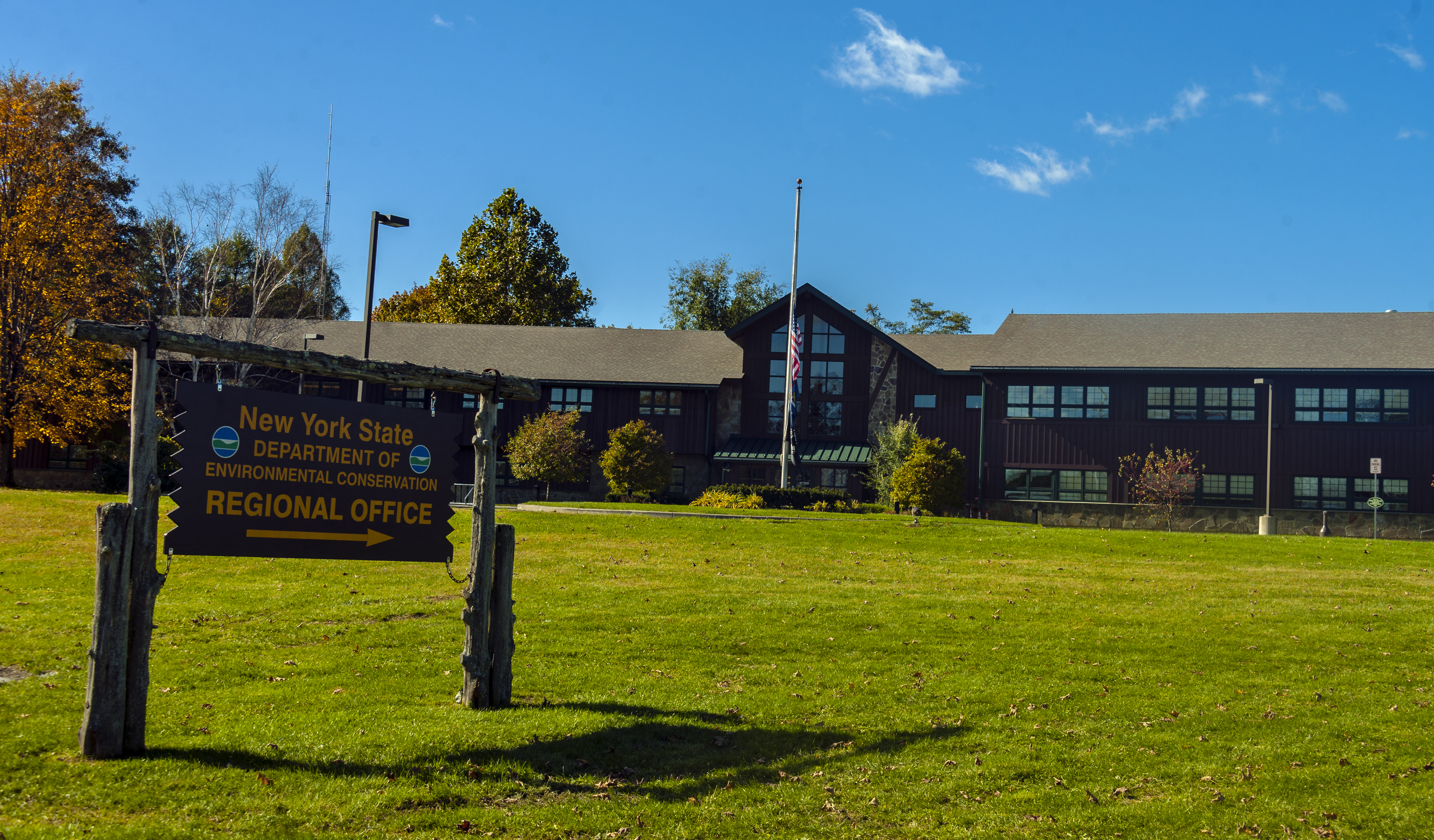
Region 3 office in New Paltz

DEC divides the state into nine administrative regions, all groups of counties. All DEC Program areas are represented in each regional office. Some regions have sub-offices closer to particular DEC program areas.

- Region 1: Long Island (Nassau and Suffolk counties). Regional office is in Stony Brook.
- Region 2: New York City (Bronx County, Kings County (Brooklyn), New York County (Manhattan), Richmond County (Staten Island), Queens County). Regional Office is in Long Island City.
- Region 3: Lower Hudson Valley (Dutchess, Orange, Putnam, Rockland, Sullivan, Ulster and Westchester counties). Regional office is in New Paltz, with a sub-office in Tarrytown.
- Region 4: Capital Region/Northern Catskills (Albany, Columbia, Delaware, Greene, Montgomery, Otsego, Rensselaer, Schenectady and Schoharie counties). Regional office is in Schenectady, with a sub-office in Stamford.
- Region 5: Eastern Adirondacks/Lake Champlain (Clinton, Essex, Franklin, Fulton, Hamilton, Saratoga, Warren and Washington counties). Regional office is in Ray Brook, with sub-offices in Northville and Warrensburg.
- Region 6: Western Adirondacks/Lake Ontario (Herkimer, Jefferson, Lewis, Oneida and St. Lawrence counties). Regional office is in Watertown, with sub-offices located in Cape Vincent, Herkimer, Lowville, Potsdam and Utica.
- Region 7: Central New York (Broome, Cayuga, Chenango, Cortland, Madison, Onondaga, Oswego, Tioga and Tompkins counties). Regional office is in Syracuse, with sub-offices in Cortland, Kirkwood and Sherburne.
- Region 8: Western Finger Lakes (Chemung, Genesee, Livingston, Monroe, Ontario, Orleans, Schuyler, Seneca, Steuben, Wayne and Yates counties). Regional office is in Avon with sub-offices in Bath and Horseheads.
- Region 9: Western New York (Allegany, Cattaraugus, Chautauqua, Erie, Niagara and Wyoming counties). Regional office is in the City of Buffalo, with sub-offices in Allegany, Almond and Dunkirk.

== Employees ==
DEC employees range from holders of multiple advanced degrees to clerk/typists who may not even have attended college. They do their work everywhere from the agency's offices to deep wilderness. Almost all DEC positions are classified as civil service and require that applicants pass the appropriate exams to be considered for hiring.

ECOs and forest rangers are considered police officers under New York's Criminal Procedure Law, with the authority to carry firearms at all times and make arrests for any possible criminal violations they witness.

The majority of employees are unionized, with white collar professionals paying dues to the Public Employees Federation, blue-collar workers represented by the Civil Service Employees Association and the law enforcement officers members of the independent New York State Correctional and Police Officers' Benevolent Association, following the same pattern as other state agencies.

== Forest rangers ==
The New York State Forest Rangers (NYS Forest Rangers) are law enforcement officers within the Department of Environmental Conservation. They are responsible for enforcing state laws, carrying firearms, and protecting public lands.

Forest Rangers serve as police officers, wildland firefighters, and wilderness first responders. Their main job is to ensure public safety and protect state lands through search and rescue, fire management, law enforcement, and incident handling across New York. They patrol 4.3 million acres of public land, using various methods like vehicles, boats, ATVs, and foot travel. Rangers must live in the area they are assigned, but they may be called to work anywhere during emergencies.

The Forest Ranger force includes 134 members stationed throughout the state, with most in the Adirondack and Catskill Parks. To become a Forest Ranger, individuals must complete a 26-week training program at the SUNY-ESF Ranger School in Wanakena, NY. After training, they are assigned to one of New York's nine regions. Rangers are also trained to fight wildfires and help train local fire departments and volunteers.

=== History ===
In May, 1885, Governor David B. Hill signed Chapter 283 into law, which authorized the appointment of the Fire Wardens. The Fire Wardens were overseen by the Forest Commission, which later became the Department of Environmental Conservation.

The title of Forest Ranger was created in chapter 444 of the laws of 1912.

== DEC Police ==
The New York State Department of Environmental Conservation Police (NYSDEC Police) serves as the primary uniformed law enforcement arm of the department. Environmental Conservation Officers (ECOs) are law enforcement officers with full police authority in New York State. They are tasked with enforcing New York's environmental laws and regulations, as well as investigating potential violations.

Environmental Conservation Officers primarily focus on enforcing Environmental Conservation Law (ECL), although they have the authority to uphold all state laws. Their mission covers two main areas: fish & wildlife and environmental quality. In the realm of fish & wildlife, they investigate poaching, the illegal sale of wildlife, and ensure compliance among hunters, fishermen, trappers, and commercial fishermen (such as those involved in lobster, clam, bait fish, and food fish industries). In terms of environmental quality, their duties often include investigating timber theft, water pollution, improper pesticide use, excessive emissions from commercial vehicles, wetland degradation, illegal mining, and other violations that impact air, land, or water quality.

== Frequent interagency partners ==
DEC frequently works closely on some matters with other agencies at different levels of government.

- The United States Environmental Protection Agency (EPA). DEC's Hudson River drillings were used by EPA as a basis for its own tests that led to its decision to dredge the PCBs from the bed of the upper Hudson.
- The New York State Office of Parks, Recreation and Historic Preservation (NYSOPRHP) is the agency in charge of New York's state parks, while DEC manages other lands. The two sometimes collaborate on projects such as the Genesee Valley Greenway, where neither agency has the expertise or jurisdiction to realize the project on its own.
- The Palisades Interstate Park Commission, which manages many of the state parks in the downstate region. Projects like the proposed Catskill Interpretive Center are to be built on land owned by PIPC since New York's state constitution is generally interpreted to preclude DEC or other state agencies from doing such things on state-owned land inside the Adirondack or Catskill parks.
- The New York City Department of Environmental Protection (DEP) is in charge and control of the city's water resources, mainly the upstate reservoirs, manages the city's storm water and sewage systems, has jurisdiction over air and noise pollution within the city, and responds to emergencies caused by releases or threatened releases of hazardous substances into the environment. Most of DEP's activities take place within DEC's Region 2.
- The Adirondack Park Agency has final authority over most private land use in that park.

== Financing ==
Licensing and permitting fees provide the DEC with the majority of its primary operating revenue, at about 58%. Direct funding from the state contributes another 24%, and federal programs and grants make up the remaining 17% difference.

== Headquarters building ==
The agency is headquartered at 625 Broadway in Albany in a 165-foot postmodern steel building. It is topped by a green dome. The building was constructed in 2001 for a cost of $65 million.

== See also ==
- List of New York state forests
- List of New York wild forests
- List of New York state wildlife management areas
- List of state and territorial fish and wildlife management agencies in the United States
- List of law enforcement agencies in New York
