= John C. Crawford =

American politician from Wisconsin, US

John C. Crawford was an American from Monroe, Wisconsin who served a single one-year term as a Whig member of the Wisconsin State Assembly for Green County in the 2nd (1849) Wisconsin Legislature. He succeeded Henry Adams, a Democrat, and was succeeded by William C. Green (also a Democrat).

He was a founding member of the Wisconsin Historical Society when it was organized in 1849, and was elected vice-president from Green County for the new organization at their founding meeting.
