= John C. Hall =

American physician and politician (1821–1896)

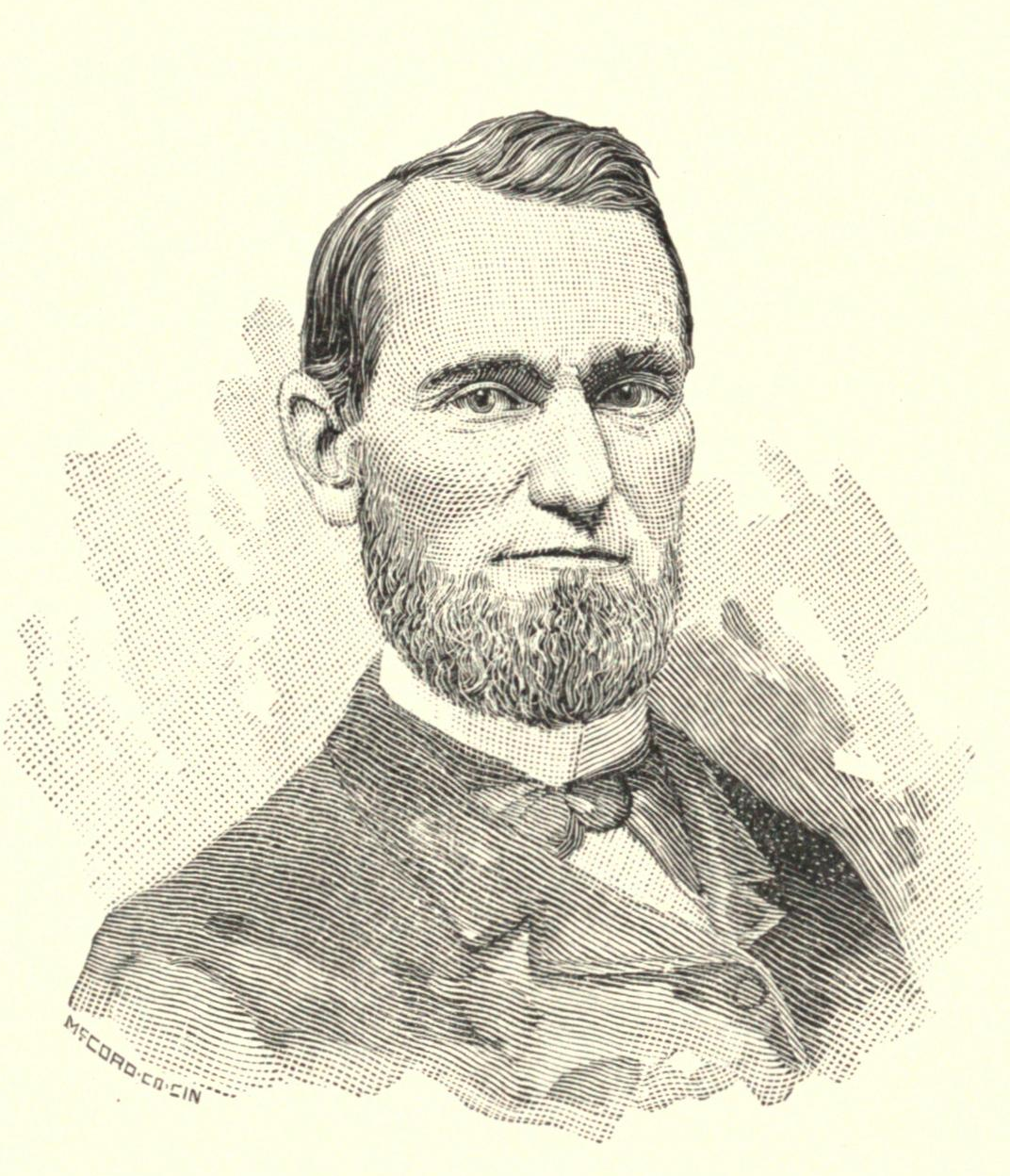

Member of the Wisconsin Senate from the 24th district
- In office January 1, 1870 – January 1, 1872
- Preceded by: Henry Adams
- Succeeded by: Joseph E. Irish

Personal details
- Born: May 21, 1821 Langdon, New Hampshire, U.S.
- Died: November 29, 1896 (aged 75) Medical Lake, Washington, U.S.
- Resting place: Greenwood Memorial Terrace, Spokane, Washington
- Party: Democratic; Republican (before 1870s)
- Spouses: Theodate E. Stackpole; (died 1917)
- Children: Theo Hall; (b. 1854; died 1935); Wendall Hall
- Education: Harvard Medical School
- Profession: Physician, Politician

Military service
- Allegiance: United States
- Branch/service: United States Volunteers; Union Army
- Years of service: 1862–1865
- Rank: Surgeon
- Unit: 6th Reg. Wis. Vol. Infantry; Iron Brigade
- Battles/wars: American Civil War

John C. Hall (May 21, 1821 – November 29, 1896) was an American medical doctor, politician, and Wisconsin pioneer. He was a member of the Wisconsin State Senate, representing Green County in 1870 and 1871, and served as a Union Army surgeon in the American Civil War.

== Biography ==
Born in Langdon, New Hampshire, Hall went to the public schools, North Yarmouth Academy, and Westbrook Seminary. In 1852, Hall received his medical degree from Harvard Medical School and moved, that same year, to Monroe, Wisconsin, where he practiced medicine.

During the American Civil War, Hall served in the 6th Wisconsin Infantry Regiment as surgeon of the regiment. In 1870 and 1871, Hall was elected to the Wisconsin State Senate; although he would later be described as "a Democrat in politics", he was elected as an "Independent Republican" over the official Republican nominee.

During the first presidency of Grover Cleveland, Hall was appointed president of the Board of United States Pension Examiners for Wisconsin. In 1891, Hall retired from the medical practice and left Wisconsin for the state of Washington. Subsequently, during Cleveland's second term as president, Hall was appointed to the Board of Pension Examiners in Washington.

In Washington, Hall resided at Medical Lake, Washington, where he retired. He died in Medical Lake, Washington.

== Personal life and family ==
John C. Hall married Theodate Stackpole. Hall was survived by his wife and two children. Their daughter, Theo Hall, served as postmaster at Medical Lake, Washington.

== Electoral history ==
Wisconsin Senate, 24th District Election, 1869
Party	Candidate	Votes	%	±%
General Election, November 2, 1869
Independent Republican	John C. Hall	1,467	51.35%	
Republican	Walter S. Wescott	1,390	48.65%	
Plurality		77	2.69%	
Total votes		2,857	100.0%	
Republican hold				

Wisconsin Senate
Preceded by Henry Adams	Member of the Wisconsin Senate from the 24th district January 1, 1870 – January 1, 1872	Succeeded by Joseph E. Irish
