= Postville, Wisconsin =

- Unincorporated community
- Location within Wisconsin Location within the United States
- Coordinates: 42°47′57″N 89°45′10″W
- Country: United States
- State: Wisconsin
- County: Green
- Town: York
- Elevation: 1,043 ft (318 m)
- Time zone: UTC-6 (Central (CST))
  - Summer (DST): UTC-5 (CDT)
- Area code: 608
- GNIS feature ID: 1571821

Postville (formerly known as Stewart) is an unincorporated community located in the town of York, Green County, Wisconsin, United States.

== Notable people ==
- Hiram Gabriel, Wisconsin State Assemblyman and farmer, lived in Stewart; Gabriel served as the chairman of the York Town Board.
