= Jefferson F. Wescott =

Member of Wisconsin State Assembly

Jefferson F. Wescott was a member of the Wisconsin State Assembly.

== Biography ==
Wescott was born on March 26, 1826, in Wethersfield, New York. He later taught school in New Glarus, Wisconsin, where his father was a local politician, as well as working as a farmer and merchant. He was a member of the Assembly during the 1869 session. In addition, he was Magistrate and Clerk of New Glarus and a justice of the peace. He was a Republican. On his 30th birthday, Wescott married Sarah E. Rogers. They would have eight children. His brothers, Walter and Ezra, were also legislators. Wescott died on February 16, 1879.
