= Todd Larson =

American diplomat and politician

Member of the Board of Supervisors of Green County, Wisconsin, from the 25th district
- Incumbent
- Assumed office April 2022
- Preceded by: Kristi Leonard

Personal details
- Born: 1960 (age 65–66)
- Party: Democratic
- Website: Campaign website

Todd Larson (born 1960) is an American lawyer, diplomat, and Democratic politician from Green County, Wisconsin. He is credited as a significant contributor in the effort to secure rights and benefits for LGBT employees of the United Nations, and served as senior presidential political appointee in the United States Agency for International Development (USAID) during the Obama administration, with a mandate to pursue implementation of President Obama's 2011 Presidential Memorandum on International Initiatives to Advance the Human Rights of Lesbian, Gay, Bisexual, and Transgender Persons.

== Early life and education ==
Todd Larson was raised and educated in Madison, Wisconsin, graduating from James Madison Memorial High School in 1978. In his teenage years, his parents purchased a family farm in the town of York, Green County, Wisconsin, located between Blanchardville and New Glarus, which became a summer home and later primary residence for Larson. The farm is now known as Larson Farm.

Larson earned his undergraduate degree in history from Carleton College in 1983 (Phi Beta Kappa and Magna Cum Laude), with an emphasis in the French language. He went on to earn a J.D. and master's degree in international studies from the University of Washington in 1988.

== Work with the United Nations ==
Larson's work with the Federation of International Civil Servants' Associations and the UN Gay, Lesbian, Bisexual Employees group (UNGLOBE) starting in the mid 1990s led to what are considered the first affirmative, internal policy initiatives in the then 60-year history of the UN in favor of LGBTQI+ rights, particularly a successful eight-year effort to convince the UN to give domestic partners and same-gender spouses of employees the same benefits and entitlements of employment as have always been granted to UN employees' opposite gender spouses.

Larson was employed at the United Nations for twenty years in a variety of legal and managerial capacities, most recently as Senior Counselor at the World Intellectual Property Organization in New York. In his career at the UN, Larson served with the High Commissioner for Refugees in Indonesia and Malaysia and with the Department of Peacekeeping Operations in Cambodia, Haiti and the Former Yugoslavia.

== LGBT advocacy ==
Larson served on the board of directors for the International Gay and Lesbian Human Rights Commission (IGLHRC, now OutRight Action International) from 2007 to 2013, and was co-chair of the board for the majority of that period. He also served on the board of directors for the Fair Wisconsin Education Fund.

Larson led the adoption of June as Pride Month in rural, agricultural Green County, WI.

== Political Appointments ==
=== Obama administration ===
Larson's role at USAID included a mandate to coordinate the Agency's implementation of the President's December 6, 2011, memorandum on "International Initiatives to Advance the Human Rights of LGBT Persons" and, in particular, lead ongoing inter-Agency efforts to ensure regular U.S. Government engagement with governments, citizens, civil society and the private sector to build respect for the human rights and development of LGBTQI+ persons. According to USAID Deputy Administrator Mark Feierstein, this included "bringing together domestic and global partners while ensuring that USAID is integrating LGBT considerations into every area of our work and every place where we work."

This also entailed building an LGBTQI+ office mandate, staffing table, budget and programmatic vision which had never previously existed for the US federal government. Larson also authored an historic Federal Rule binding all US foreign assistance to be made exclusively in non-discriminatory fashion.

=== Governor Evers Administration ===
Larson has been appointed by Wisconsin Governor Tony Evers twice. To the Wisconsin Humanities Council and to the Historical Records Advisory Board.

== Elected office ==
In 2022, Larson sought a seat on the Green County board of supervisors. The nonpartisan election was abnormally contentious, but Larson defeated his opponent by a wide margin, turning out a higher percentage of voters than nearly any other district in the county. In doing so, Larson became the first ever openly gay elected official of Green County, Wisconsin. At the same time, Larson was supporting Millennial Action Project CEO Steven Olikara in his bid for the Democratic nomination for the 2022 U.S. Senate election—Olikara came in a distant 5th place in the primary.

In 2025, Larson announced that he would be a candidate for Wisconsin Senate in 2026, seeking the 17th Senate district seat currently occupied by Republican Howard Marklein. The 17th Senate district comprises the southwest corner of the state, from Crawford County to Green County, and is projected to be one of the most competitive legislative races in 2026. Larson subsequently dropped out of the Senate race in protest over the state senate democratic caucus having endorsed a colleague of theirs more than a full year before the primary.

== Awards ==
Larson was recognized as a distinguished alumnus of the University of Washington School of Law in 2007, James Madison Memorial High School in 2009, the Henry M. Jackson School of International Studies in 2020, and Carleton College in 2020.

Larson was given special recognition by IGLHRC (now OutRight Action International) in 2014, commemorating his years of volunteer service and tenure as chairperson of the board.

== Personal life ==
After graduating from Carleton College in 1983, Larson served in the Peace Corps for two years in Togo, West Africa. Larson owns and manages his family property Larson Farm. Larson's groundbreaking LGBTQI+ roles at the United Nations and in the US federal government are chronicled in a legacy article in the Wisconsin publication, Our Lives.

Larson has frequent public-speaking engagements, including delivering the (online) 2020 commencement address for the University of Washington School of International Studies and the keynote address at the 2019 Out After Carleton Family Reunion.

Interestingly, Larson Farm has a long political history which Larson is following. George Fjelstad Sr., who married into the family which originally settled Larson Farm, served as chair of the Perry Town Board (the northern half of Larson Farm sits in Perry Township, Dane County) and later held the position of Dane County Clerk for 18 years, until 1924. And Selma Fjelstad, George's daughter, upset his successor in a contentious race to become county clerk in 1926 – and the first woman ever elected to office in Dane County.

In 2025, Larson drew on his experience e.g. in the Obama administration to pen a widely circulated editorial which proposed fundamentally recalibrating US foreign policy.
