= York, Green County, Wisconsin =

York, Wisconsin
- Town
- Location in Green County and the state of Wisconsin.
- Coordinates: 42°48′43″N 89°46′10″W
- Country: United States
- State: Wisconsin
- County: Green

Area
  - Total: 36.0 sq mi (93.2 km^{2})
  - Land: 36.0 sq mi (93.2 km^{2})
  - Water: 0 sq mi (0.0 km^{2})
- Elevation: 1,053 ft (321 m)

Population (2020)
  - Total: 969
  - Density: 26.9/sq mi (10.4/km^{2})
- Time zone: UTC-6 (Central (CST))
  - Summer (DST): UTC-5 (CDT)
- Area code: 608
- FIPS code: 55-89475
- GNIS feature ID: 1584494

York is a town in Green County, Wisconsin, United States. The population was 969 at the 2020 census. The unincorporated community of Postville is located in the town. The ghost town of Farmers Grove was also located in the town.

== History ==
York’s first settlers came to its southeastern sections beginning in 1838 or 1840. Many of these people were “Yankees” from New York, so when Wisconsin became a state in 1848, the Town of York was named after these settlers who came from “York State.” The first election of a township board was two years later in 1850. Many of these early pioneers are buried in Green’s Prairie Cemetery, but even more moved farther West within the next thirty years. Westward movement was the resounding mentality of the day.

Beginning in 1851, Norwegians began to settle in the northern and western portions of the township where the hills and valleys were more wooded and rugged. This area had been settled more sparsely by the Yankees, leaving government land for the Norwegians to purchase. The hills and valleys reminded the Norwegian of home, even if it was not a conscious factor for settling here. Many hilltops were prairie, something unusual to them, but the wooded hillsides and valleys with their curves and creeks were familiar. The land was fertile and comparably rock-free, but it was the water quality of the area that may have held the strongest draw.

The Norwegian population of York was part of the historic Norwegian Blue Mounds settlement, part of a contiguous settlement of Norwegians, connecting with Perry and Primrose in Dane County northward through Springdale, Blue Mounds, and Vermont; Moscow in Iowa County; Blanchard in Lafayette County; and Town of Adams in Green County. The Towns of York and Perry formed the most ethnically concentrated portion of this settlement. There were problems with malaria in some earlier Norwegian settlements of Muskego and the Fox River Valley in Illinois and, therefore, flat land, something already conceptually strange to Norwegians, gained a tarnished reputation through an association with swamps, unclean stagnant water, and disease. In York and the Driftless Area, the water gushed out of the hills in a constant flow of bountiful springs. The Norwegians came here with their health and comfort in mind.

In 1855, a Norwegian Lutheran congregation in York formed and, in 1861, they began to build their church at the intersection of what is now Hwys 39 and 78. The Norwegian Lutherans eventually decided they could not agree upon the subject of predestination and the congregation split in two. Another church was then built across the road in 1885. The two churches eventually became known as “Old York” and “York Memorial.”

Meanwhile, Yankee inhabitants built two churches in Postville in 1868. One was for a Free-Will Baptist Society and the other was for a Methodist congregation that had been conducting services in the township since 1842.

A sawmill was in operation from 1855-1868 on the east bank of Sawmill Creek where Sawmill Road crosses. As homesteads were claimed and structures were built, the sawmill provided lumber.

There were three post offices in the Town of York by the turn of the twentieth century: Stewart (located in Postville), Ula (at the Ula farm), and Bem (at Strahm’s Corners: the intersection of Hwy 39 and County J). The first post office was called Farmer’s Grove and established in 1846. Its location moved several times with changes in postmasters who each operated out of their homes, so it eventually ended up in Town of Adams. Bem opened next in 1850, followed by Stewart in 1862, and Ula in 1889. Mail was brought from Mineral Point through the Town of Moscow to these stations by stagecoach on the way to Monroe. Post offices were consolidated between 1900 and 1904 and rural route deliveries out of Blanchardville, New Glarus, Daleyville, and Mount Horeb then began to serve most York residents.

The main industry for all the settlers was wheat farming until chinch bugs, overused soil, and lowered prices caused its profitability to drop significantly in the 1870s. Dairy farming, specifically for cheese production, became the saving grace for farmers. Between 1876 and 1888, a cheese factory was built in nearly every valley. These factories brought Swiss cheesemakers into the township and Swiss farmers had already begun settling properties on the eastern end of the township where it connects with the Town of New Glarus. There were at least fourteen cheese factories: York Prairie, York Prairie Valley, Steppe Valley, Makepeace, Brager, York Center, Poplar Grove, Hay Hollow, Blue Ribbon, Sawmill, Postville, Farmer’s Grove, Vinger, and Strommen.

After only seven documented residents in 1840, there were 904 by 1860. The Town of York reached its peak population in 1870 when there were 1,088 residents. The population was not stagnant as many continued their westward journey to homestead-able land, but thanks to continued immigration from especially Norway, but also Switzerland, the numbers stayed more-or-less steady until 1900. After 1900, a noticeable decline in population began, largely due to smaller familial units and migration into villages and cities. The population continued to decrease until York reached a low point of 509 residents in 1990.

== Geography ==
According to the United States Census Bureau, the town has a total area of 36.0 square miles (93.2 km^{2}), all land.

== Demographics ==
Historical population
| Census | Pop. | Note | %± |
|---|---|---|---|
| 1840 | 7 | | — |
| 1850 | 191 | | 2,628.6% |
| 1860 | 904 | | 373.3% |
| 1870 | 1,088 | | 20.4% |
| 1880 | 1,051 | | −3.4% |
| 1890 | 1,009 | | −4.0% |
| 1900 | 1,036 | | 2.7% |
| 1910 | 876 | | −15.4% |
| 1920 | 874 | | −0.2% |
| 1930 | 786 | | −10.1% |
| 1940 | 717 | | −8.8% |
| 1950 | 654 | | −8.8% |
| 1960 | 670 | | 2.4% |
| 1970 | 527 | | −21.3% |
| 1980 | 552 | | 4.7% |
| 1990 | 509 | | −7.8% |
| 2000 | 605 | | 18.9% |
| 2010 | 910 | | 50.4% |
| 2020 | 969 | | 6.5% |
U.S. Decennial Census

As of the census of 2000, there were 605 people, 216 households, and 174 families residing in the town. The population density was 16.8 people per square mile (6.5/km^{2}). There were 230 housing units at an average density of 6.4 per square mile (2.5/km^{2}). The racial makeup of the town was 99.34% White, and 0.66% from two or more races. Hispanic or Latino of any race were 0.17% of the population.

There were 216 households, out of which 38.4% had children under the age of 18 living with them, 74.5% were married couples living together, 3.7% had a female householder with no husband present, and 19.0% were non-families. 13.0% of all households were made up of individuals, and 1.4% had someone living alone who was 65 years of age or older. The average household size was 2.80 and the average family size was 3.03.

In the town, the population was spread out, with 27.1% under the age of 18, 4.5% from 18 to 24, 33.9% from 25 to 44, 28.1% from 45 to 64, and 6.4% who were 65 years of age or older. The median age was 38 years. For every 100 females, there were 106.5 males. For every 100 females age 18 and over, there were 107.0 males.

The median income for a household in the town was $50,833, and the median income for a family was $49,643. Males had a median income of $29,583 versus $29,000 for females. The per capita income for the town was $20,622. About 1.6% of families and 1.9% of the population were below the poverty line, including 2.1% of those under age 18 and none of those age 65 or over.

== Notable people ==
- Carl Martin Bergh, was a Norwegian-American immigrant who is most associated with the resettlement of fellow Scandinavian families to the area of James City County and York County surrounding the community of Norge, Virginia. His family had first settled in York when he was a child and lived here until after marriage.
- Hiram Gabriel, Wisconsin state legislator, lived in the town; Gabriel was the chairman of the York Town Board
- Elisha T. Gardner, first white settler in York, later a lawyer, and state senator, lived in the town
- William Comstock Green, Wisconsin state legislator, lived in the town
- Isaac Milo Kittleson, Mayor of Madison, Wisconsin from 1920 to 1925. He lived most of his childhood in York
- Todd Larson, elected official for Green County Board of Supervisors; Presidential appointee in Obama administration; United Nations employee
- Robert M. La Follette, his father and sibling were buried in the Green's Prairie Cemetery within Town of York. They lived just north in Primrose.
- Oscar R. Olson, state senator
- Ezra Wescott, Wisconsin state legislator, was magistrate of the town
- Walter S. Wescott, Wisconsin state legislator, lived in the town
