= James Campbell (Wisconsin politician) =

American politician

James Campbell (February 19, 1814 – January 16, 1883) was a member of the Wisconsin State Assembly.

== Biography ==
Campbell was born in Susquehanna County, Pennsylvania in 1814. In 1835, he moved to Green County, Wisconsin. He became a railroad company president and owner. Campbell died in 1883.

== Political career ==
Campbell was a member of the Assembly in 1861, where he chaired the committee on claims. He was a Republican.
