= Northville, New York =

Northville, New York may refer to two places in the United States:

- Northville, Fulton County, New York
- Northville, Suffolk County, New York
