= Camp O'Ryan =

Coordinates: 42.6823171°N 78.2790685°W

Camp O'Ryan is a 375-acre (1.52 km^{2}) former New York National Guard training area, also known as the North Java Rifle Range and the Wethersfield Rifle Range, located 3 miles (4.8 km) east of North Java, in the Town of Wethersfield, in the County of Wyoming in New York State.

== History ==
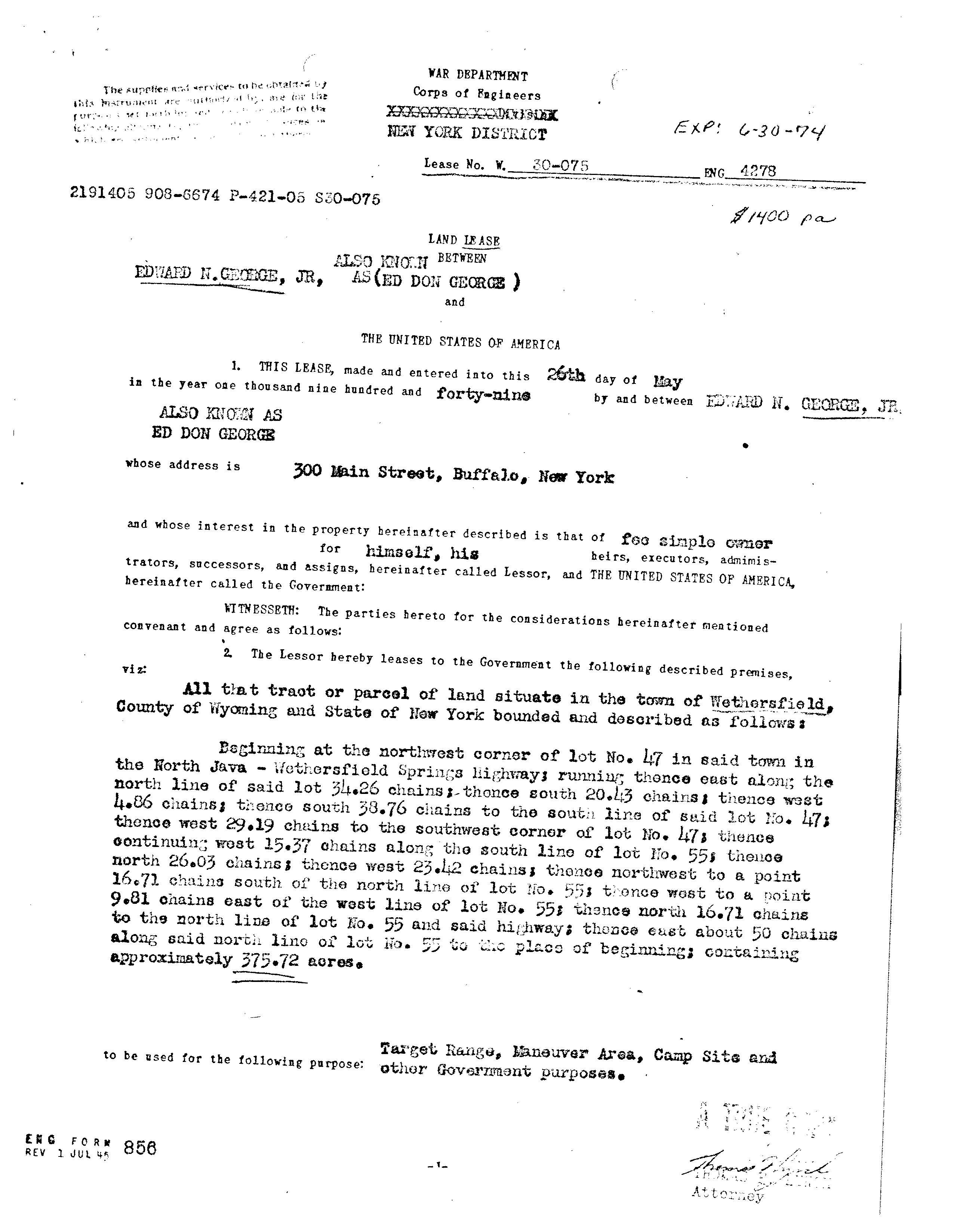
Camp O'Ryan Lease - between Ed Don George and the U.S. Army Corps of Engineers (page 1)

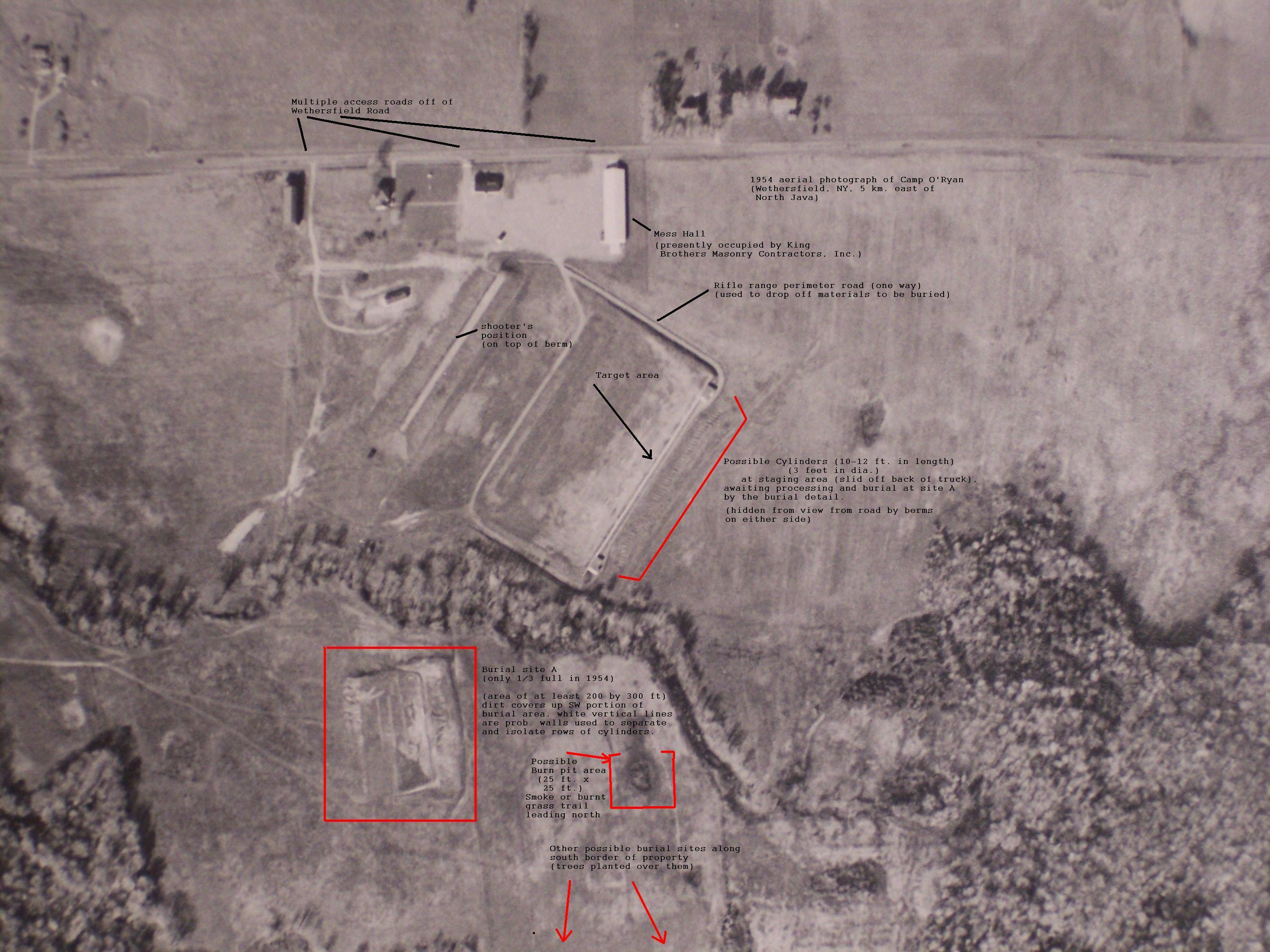
Camp O'Ryan (east end) 1954

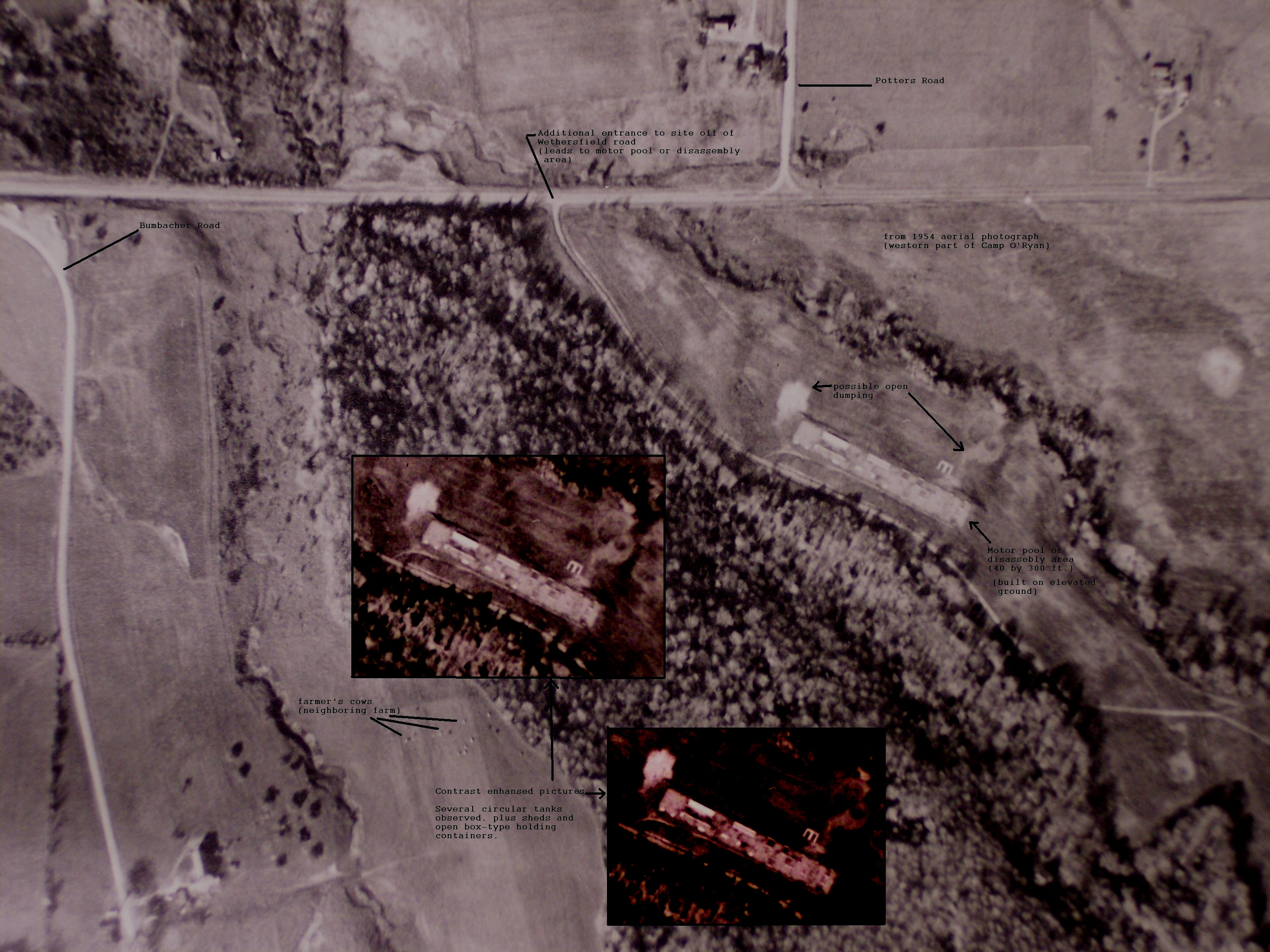
Camp O'Ryan (west end) 1954

Camp O'Ryan, which was opened in late 1949 or early 1950, was initially called the Wethersfield training area. It was designed for the New York Division of Military and Naval Affairs by the Army Corps of Engineers , and was almost completely built by the end of 1949. The New York National Guard was the primary occupant, but it has also been used by the Naval Militia, the Army Reserves, Air Force and the New York State Police. It was later renamed Camp O’Ryan in honor of Major General John F. O'Ryan at a dedication ceremony on June 7, 1952, with General O'Ryan in attendance. Major General Karl F. Hausauer, chief-of-staff to Governor Thomas E. Dewey and commanding general of the NYNG spoke at the occasion. He described the Wethersfield camp at that time as "the home grounds of the present 27th Infantry Division." He then read a letter from Governor Dewey which said in part "I know that your name—given to this New York National Guard camp—will serve to keep those soldierly qualities which you represent forever present in the minds of all the young and patriotic citizen-soldiers who will train here through future years." Also in attendance was the First Battalion of the 174th Infantry Regiment, the 27th Infantry Division Military Police Company, the 27th Infantry Division Band, as well as Brig. Gen. William H. Kelly, vice chief-of-staff to the governor and state adjutant general, Brig. Gen. Hampton A. Anderson, deputy vice chief-of-staff to the governor, Brig. Gen. Gerard W. Kelley, chief-of-staff, headquarters, NYNG, and Brig. Gen. Alfred H. Doud, commander 105th Anti-aircraft Artillery Brigade.

During the Korean and Vietnam Wars, the use of Camp O'Ryan increased as many National Guardsmen trained at the site. A multipage article in the Buffalo Courier-Express, run on November 10, 1968, depicted some of the training done at this camp. This included rifle target practice as well as pistol training.

Training there ceased in 1974, although may have been used by other agencies as late as the mid-1980s. Originally a rifle range, it was later expanded for wider activities over the following years. The property was owned by Edward N. George Jr. (a.k.a. Ed Don George), wrestler, promoter, and naval commander. He leased it to the Federal Government for 25 years almost immediately after purchasing the property from Charles R. Greenan in 1949.

== Environmental concerns ==
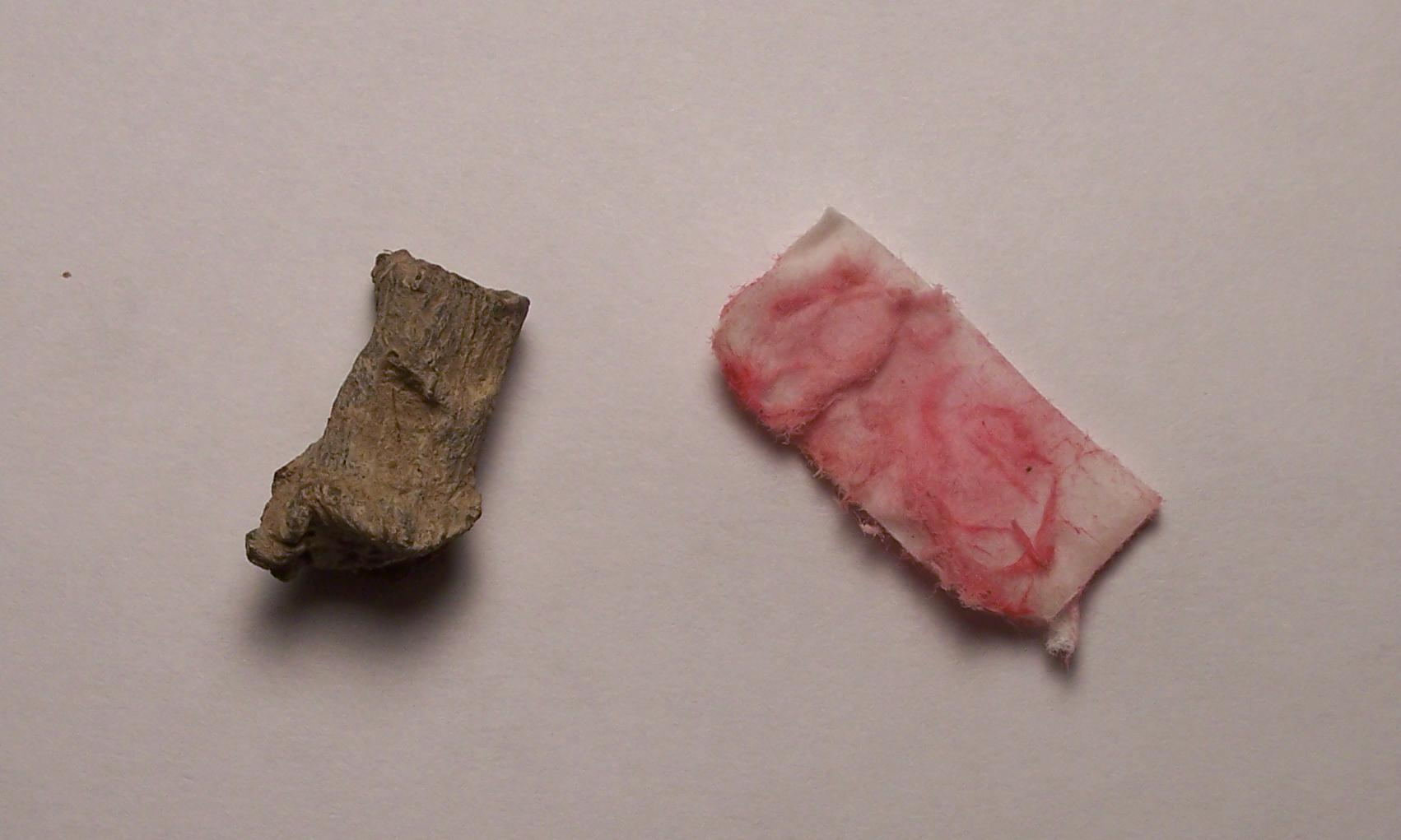
Camp O'Ryan bullet, one of many, found Spring 2007, and positive lead test pad

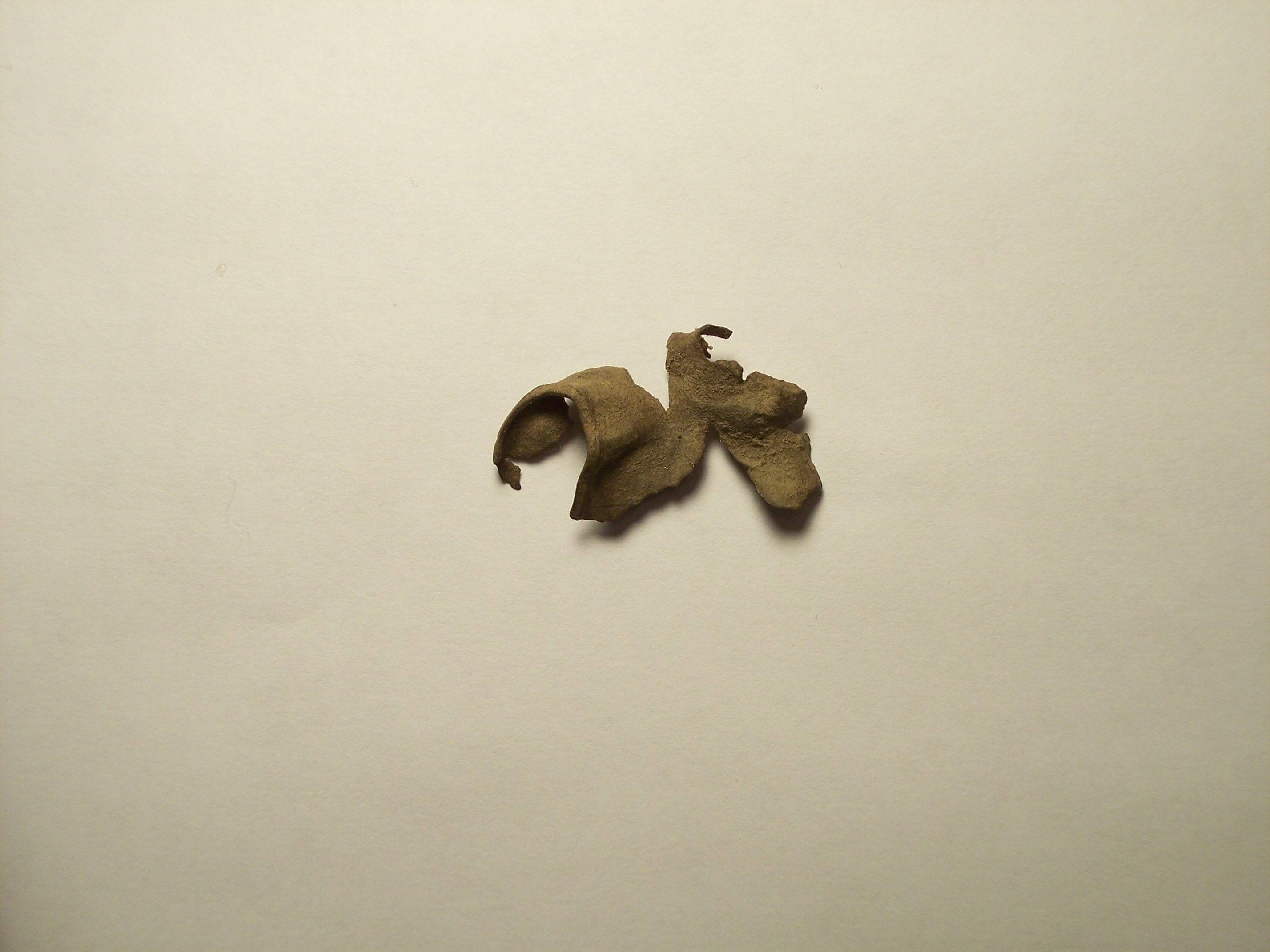
Corroded Full metal jacket bullet fragment from Camp O'Ryan - found Spring 2007

Photographs of this site indicate there was an active burial site of approximately 200 by 300 feet (91 m) in the mid-1950s through the mid-1960s.

In addition to these alleged burial sites, the 1954 aerial photograph shows the remnants of some type of construction, possibly a tank driving course, of approximately 60 feet (18 m) in width and 350 feet (110 m) in length.

Besides the alleged burials, lead waste from expended ammunition is still present at the abandoned rifle range as of Spring 2007. It is possible this waste has contaminated local water supplies but this has not been documented.

The Corps of Engineers' (New York) District were unable to locate the engineering and architectural plans for the camp in response to a freedom of information act request. The plans were produced by the Corps of Engineers' (New York) District Engineer in 1949.
