= Harvey T. Moore =

American politician

Harvey Thomas Moore (November 9, 1809 – April 24, 1878) was an American farmer and politician.

Born in Barnet, Vermont, Harvey served in the Vermont House of Representatives, from Danville, Caledonia County, Vermont in 1849 and 1850. In 1854, Moore served as county judge of Caledonia County, Vermont. In 1857, Moore moved to Brodhead, Wisconsin and was a farmer. In 1862, he served in the Wisconsin State Assembly as a War Democrat. Then, in 1874 and 1875, Moore served in the Wisconsin State Senate and was elected on the Reform Party ticket. He served as vice president of the Sugar River Valley Railroad Company and as one of the directors of the Madison, Portage & Lake Superior Railway. Moore died in Brodhead, Wisconsin.
