= Wethersfield, New York =

- Town
- Location within Wyoming County and New York

- Location within the state of New York
- Coordinates: 42°39′6″N 78°14′8″W
- Country: United States
- State: New York
- County: Wyoming

Area
  - Total: 36.12 sq mi (93.54 km^{2})
  - Land: 35.81 sq mi (92.75 km^{2})
  - Water: 0.31 sq mi (0.80 km^{2})
- Elevation: 1,870 ft (570 m)

Population (2010)
  - Total: 883
  - Estimate (2016): 861
  - Density: 24.0/sq mi (9.28/km^{2})
- Time zone: UTC-5 (Eastern (EST))
  - Summer (DST): UTC-4 (EDT)
- FIPS code: 36-81325
- GNIS feature ID: 0979631

Wethersfield is an incorporated town in Wyoming County, New York. The population was 891 at the time of the 2000 census. The Town of Wethersfield is centrally located in the county.

== History ==
The Town of Wethersfield was established in 1823 from part of the Town of Orangeville. It was named after settlers from their home, Wethersfield, Connecticut.

== Geography ==
According to the United States Census Bureau, the town has a total area of 36.1 square miles (93 km^{2}), of which 35.8 square miles (93 km^{2}) is land and 0.3 square miles (0.78 km^{2}) (0.78%) is water.

Wethersfield has 35 General Electric wind-power turbines atop a hill at approximately 2060 feet above sea level, which can be seen from NY Route 78 (Cattaraugus Road), Perry Road (CR 9), Pee Dee Road, and Poplar Tree Road.

== Demographics ==
Historical population
Census	Pop.	Note	%±
1830	1,179		—
1840	1,728		46.6%
1850	1,489		−13.8%
1860	1,583		6.3%
1870	1,219		−23.0%
1880	1,311		7.5%
1890	1,032		−21.3%
1900	927		−10.2%
1910	928		0.1%
1920	744		−19.8%
1930	641		−13.8%
1940	616		−3.9%
1950	616		0.0%
1960	650		5.5%
1970	674		3.7%
1980	674		0.0%
1990	794		17.8%
2000	891		12.2%
2010	883		−0.9%
2016 (est.)	861		−2.5%
U.S. Decennial Census

As of the census of 2000, there were 891 people, 323 households, and 248 families residing in the town. The population density was 24.9 inhabitants per square mile (9.6/km^{2}). There were 442 housing units at an average density of 12.3 per square mile (4.7/km^{2}). The racial makeup of the town was 96.75% White, 1.01% African American, 1.12% Asian, 0.34% Pacific Islander, 0.56% from other races, and 0.22% from two or more races. Hispanic or Latino of any race were 1.01% of the population.

There were 323 households, out of which 35.3% had children under the age of 18 living with them, 63.8% were married couples living together, 6.5% had a female householder with no husband present, and 23.2% were non-families. 17.3% of all households were made up of individuals, and 6.2% had someone living alone who was 65 years of age or older. The average household size was 2.76 and the average family size was 3.08.

In the town, the population was spread out, with 29.1% under the age of 18, 8.2% from 18 to 24, 29.2% from 25 to 44, 24.5% from 45 to 64, and 9.1% who were 65 years of age or older. The median age was 36 years. For every 100 females, there were 104.8 males. For every 100 females age 18 and over, there were 110.7 males.

The median income for a household in the town was $37,337, and the median income for a family was $39,750. Males had a median income of $28,125 versus $25,625 for females. The per capita income for the town was $15,291. About 11.3% of families and 12.4% of the population were below the poverty line, including 11.5% of those under age 18 and 11.4% of those age 65 or over.

== Communities and locations in Wethersfield ==
- Camp O'Ryan – An abandoned New York National Guard rifle range located on the south side of Wethersfield Road, between Bumbacher and Poplar Tree Roads.
- Eastmans Corners – A location near the center of the town.
- Hermitage – A hamlet on Route 78 near the eastern town line.
- Poplar Tree Corners – A hamlet on Wethersfield Road on the northern border of the town.
- Smith's Corners – A hamlet on Route 78 in the southwest part of the town.
- Union Corners – A hamlet on Wethersfield Road on the western border of the town.
- Wethersfield Springs – A hamlet on Wethersfield Road on the northern border of the town, located by East Koy Creek.

== News media ==
Radio station WGR-FM is licensed to Wethersfield. The station is one of the vestiges of the Rural Radio Network and, since the 1980s, has primarily been used as a rimshot broadcaster attempting to reach the Buffalo radio market.

== Notable people ==
- Don Bosseler, retired NFL fullback, member of the College Football Hall of Fame
- James Rood Doolittle, District Attorney, Wyoming County, NY; U.S. Senator, Wisconsin.
- John Morgan, member of the Wisconsin State Assembly
- Jefferson F. Wescott, member of the Wisconsin State Assembly
- Walter S. Wescott, member of the Wisconsin State Assembly and Wisconsin State Senate
