= Senator West =

Senator West may refer to:

== Members of the United States Senate ==
- Joseph R. West (1822–1898), U.S. Senator from Louisiana
- William Stanley West (1849–1914), U.S. Senator from Georgia

== United States state senate members ==
- Absolom M. West (1818–1894), Mississippi State Senate
- Albert Benjamin West (1883–1929), Rhode Island State Senate
- Ben West (1911–1974), Tennessee State Senate
- Chris West (politician) (born 1950), Maryland State Senate
- David Sherman West (1885–1973), Iowa State Senate
- E. B. West (died 1854), Wisconsin State Senate
- Edmund A. West (1823–1922), Wisconsin State Senate
- Francis H. West (1825–1896), Wisconsin State Senate
- James E. West (politician) (1951–2006), Washington State Senate
- John C. West (1922–2004), South Carolina State Senate
- Junius Edgar West (1866–1947), Virginia State Senate
- Royce West (born 1952), Texas State Senate
- Samuel H. West (1872–1938), Ohio State Senate
- Steve West (Kentucky politician) (born 1970), Kentucky State Senate
- T. C. West (1868–1936), California State Senate
- Thomas F. West (1874–1931), Florida State Senate
- Tom West (Kansas politician) (1925–1975), Kansas State Senate
- William H. West (judge) (1824–1911), Ohio State Senate
