= Troop engagements of the American Civil War, 1865 =

Years
1861
1862
1863
1864
1865
or return to the main page.

This is a list of battles and skirmishes of the American Civil War during the year 1865, the final year of the war. During the year, Union forces were able to capture the last major Confederate ports still open to shipping, along with the Confederate capital, and forced the surrender of the four major Confederate commands.

== History ==
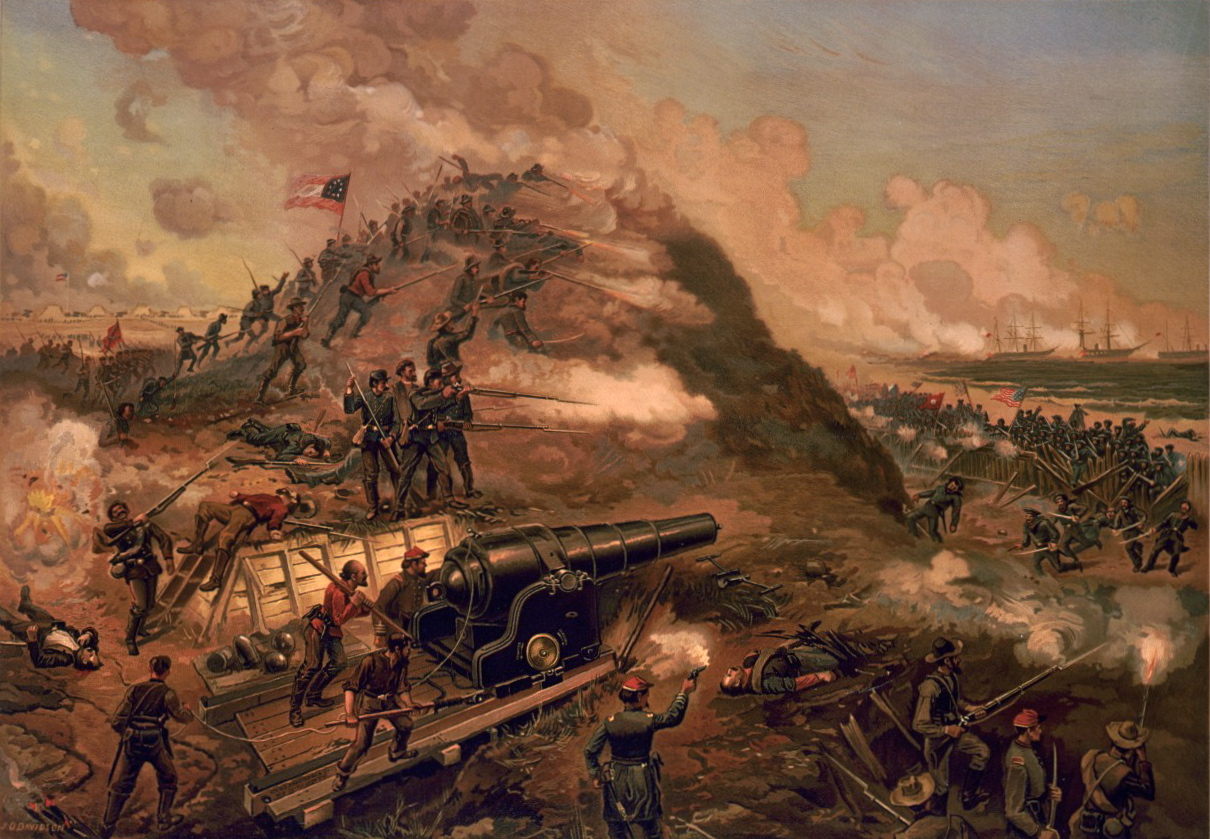
Capture of Fort Fisher

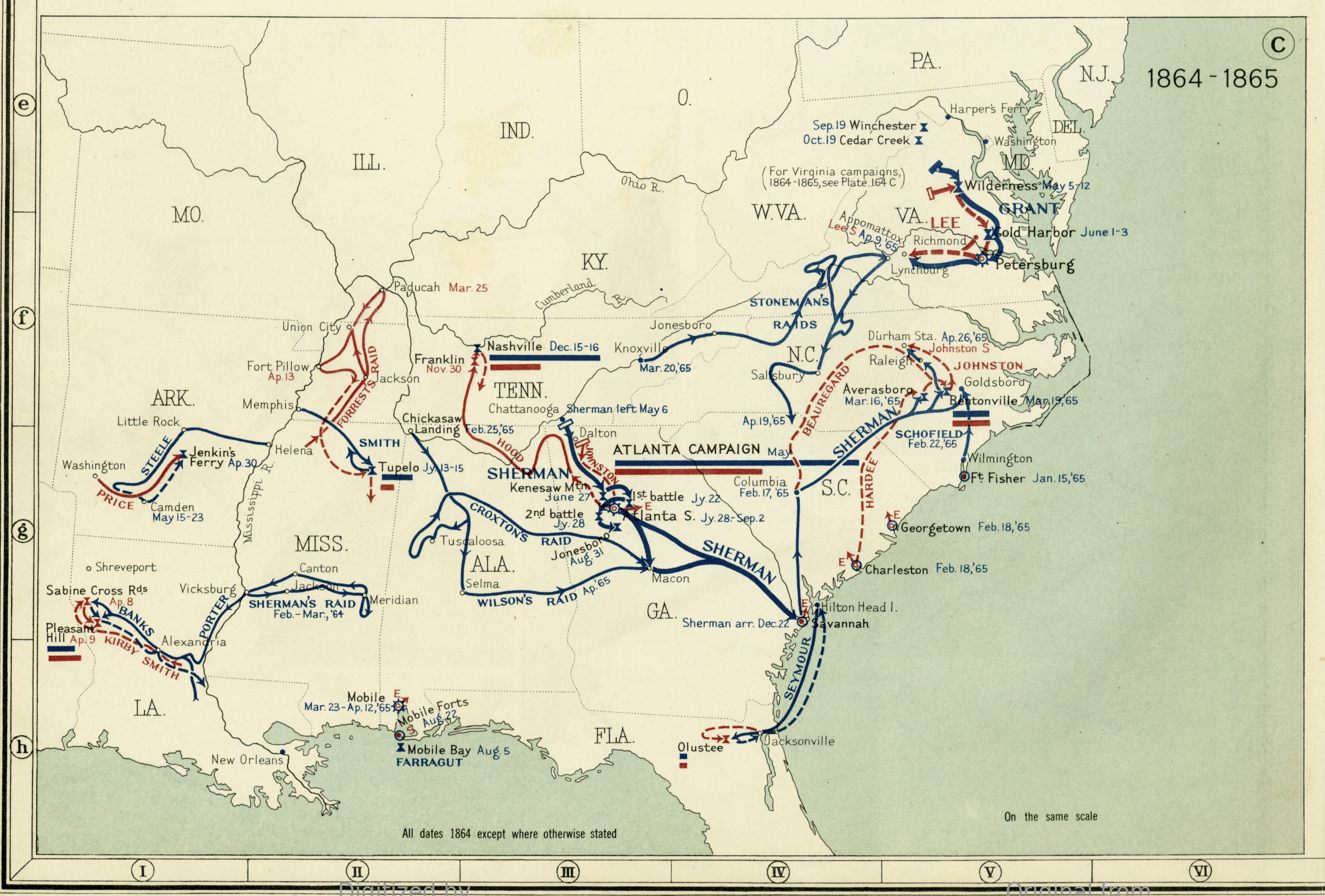
Map of the American Civil War in 1864-1865.

In the Eastern Theater, a combined Union army and naval force, commanded by Major General Alfred H. Terry and Rear Admiral David D. Porter, captured Fort Fisher at the mouth of the Cape Fear River on January 15, which led to the evacuation of other Confederate fortifications along the coastline near Fort Fisher. The capture of Fort Fisher closed the port of Wilmington, North Carolina to Confederate blockade runners, although the Confederates still held the city in order to remove the government supplies stored there and also to prevent Terry from reinforcing William T. Sherman's army, which was then marching north through the Carolinas. After repairing Fort Fisher, Terry was reinforced by the XXIII Corps under Major General John M. Schofield, who took overall command of Union operations in North Carolina. Schofield started his advance towards Wilmington in mid-February with Terry's corps along the east bank, making a demonstration against the main Confederate force there while the XXIII Corps, supported by Porter's gunboats, moved along the west bank of the Cape Fear River. The capture of Fort Anderson on February 19 forced the Confederates to evacuate their defensive positions south of the city; following several more skirmishes, Union forces entered Wilmington on February 22.

On April 1 and 2, Union forces commanded by Lieutenant General Ulysses S. Grant launched a series of attacks on the Confederate Army of Northern Virginia near Petersburg, Virginia, overrunning the Confederate fortifications and cutting the supply lines south of the city. As a result, General Robert E. Lee was forced to evacuate both that city and Richmond, ending the nine-month-long Siege of Petersburg. Lee first moved west along the Richmond & Danville Railroad, planning to flee southwards to North Carolina to unite with other Confederate forces. The Confederate army had a head start over the Union army but Lee was forced to wait at Amelia Court House, due to the Confederate units in Richmond being delayed in crossing the Appomattox River; this allowed Union cavalry and infantry to arrive in Jettersville ahead of the Confederates, which forced Lee to march farther west than he had planned before attempting to turn south. Over the next few days, the Union army continued to press the Confederates from the south and the west, forcing Lee to retreat farther westward. At Appomattox Court House, Grant managed to surround Lee and forced him to surrender on April 9.

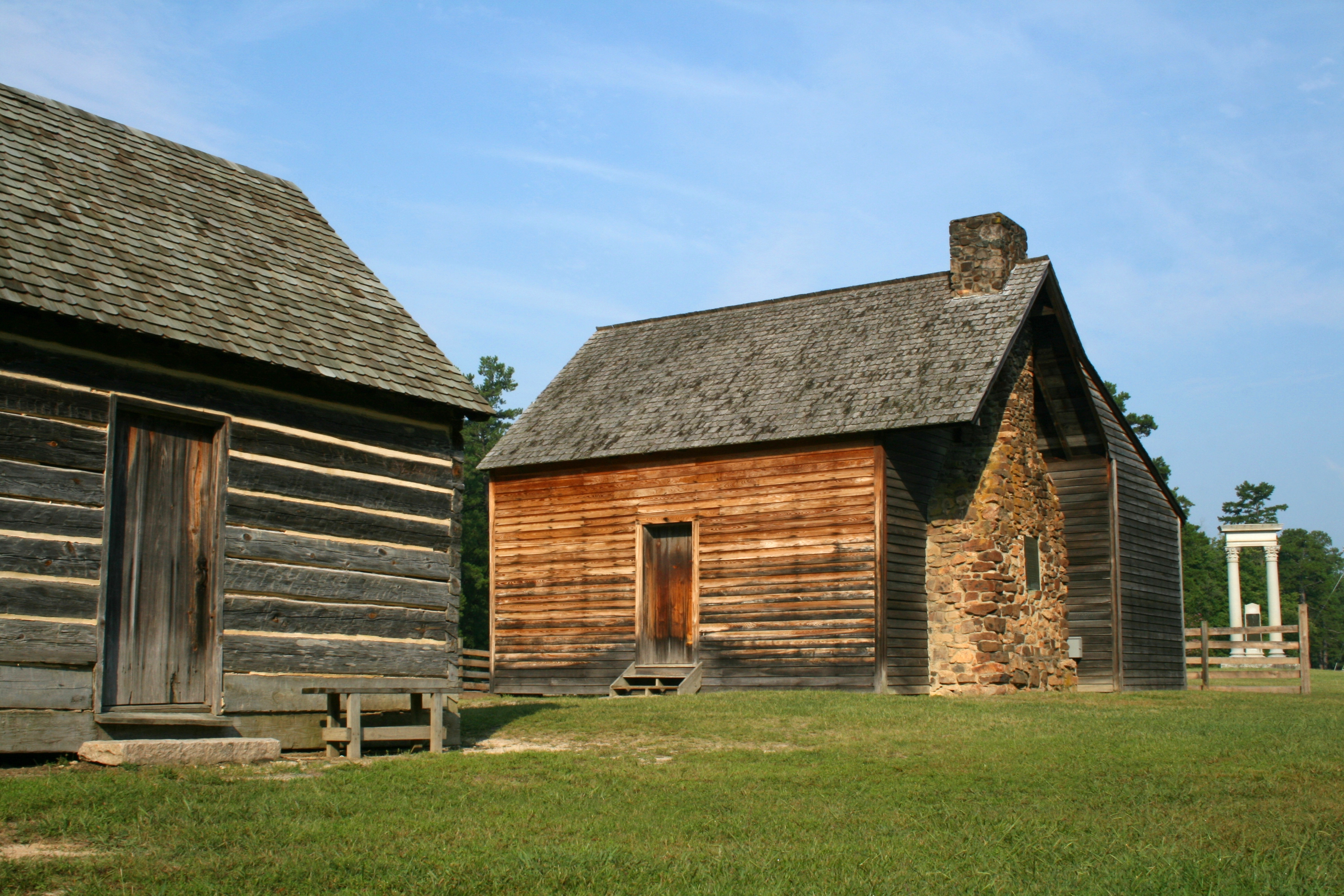
Bennett Place, where the surrender of the Confederate Army of Tennessee took place on April 26

In the Carolinas, Major General William T. Sherman started north from Savannah, Georgia, in late February, planning to unite with U.S. Grant's armies near Petersburg, Virginia. Driving the Confederates from South Carolina through a series of flanking maneuvers, Sherman's forces reached North Carolina in early March, divided into two parts commanded by Henry W. Slocum and Oliver O. Howard. The Confederate commander in the Carolinas was General P. G. T. Beauregard, but both Confederate President Jefferson Davis and Robert E. Lee considered him unable to handle the situation; on February 22 they appointed General Joseph E. Johnston commander of all Confederate forces in North Carolina, which included the Army of Tennessee. He concentrated his available forces together near Smithfield, hoping to attack and defeat one part of Sherman's army before the other part arrived to its assistance. Johnston launched his attack in the Battle of Bentonville on March 19, hitting Slocum's wing but the Confederates were unable to gain a victory before Howard's wing arrived that evening. After waiting at Bentonville for an additional two days, Johnston retreated back to Smithfield. Sherman united with Schofield's force at Goldsboro on March 23; he then spent the next three weeks resting and refitting his command and repairing the railroad to Wilmington. During this time, Johnston remained near Smithfield and also rested and reorganized his force; he also communicated with Lee and agreed to unite the two forces in the hope of defeating either Sherman and Grant before the Union forces could combine. Sherman started advancing against Johnston on April 10, forcing the Confederates to evacuate Smithfield and retreat towards Greensboro; the Union army captured the state capital of Raleigh on April 13. After he received news of Lee's surrender, Johnston surrendered both his army and the remaining Confederate forces in the Department of South Carolina, Georgia, and Florida at the Bennett Place, North Carolina on April 26.

In the Western Theater, Major General James H. Wilson led his cavalry corps in a raid through Alabama and Georgia starting on March 22, destroying Confederate manufacturing plants. The Confederate commander in the region, Lieutenant General Nathan Bedford Forrest, had been forced to scatter his cavalry command across northern Mississippi and Alabama during the previous winter and had difficulty concentrating it against Wilson. During the evening of April 1, Forrest concentrated his forces in the defenses of Selma, Alabama; Wilson attacked and defeated him in the Battle of Selma, then continued to the east towards Georgia. Around Mobile, Alabama (the last port still held by the Confederates), Major General Edward Canby started siege operations against the forts protecting the city on March 31, first capturing Spanish Fort on April 8 and Fort Blakely the following day. The Confederates evacuated the city of Mobile without a fight on April 11. The capture of Mobile freed additional Union troops to assist Wilson's cavalry to the north. Both this and word of the Confederate surrenders in Virginia and North Carolina convinced Richard Taylor, commander of the Confederate Department of Alabama, Mississippi, and East Louisiana, to surrender to Canby at Citronelle, Alabama, on May 4. Forrest followed with the surrender of his cavalry command on May 9.

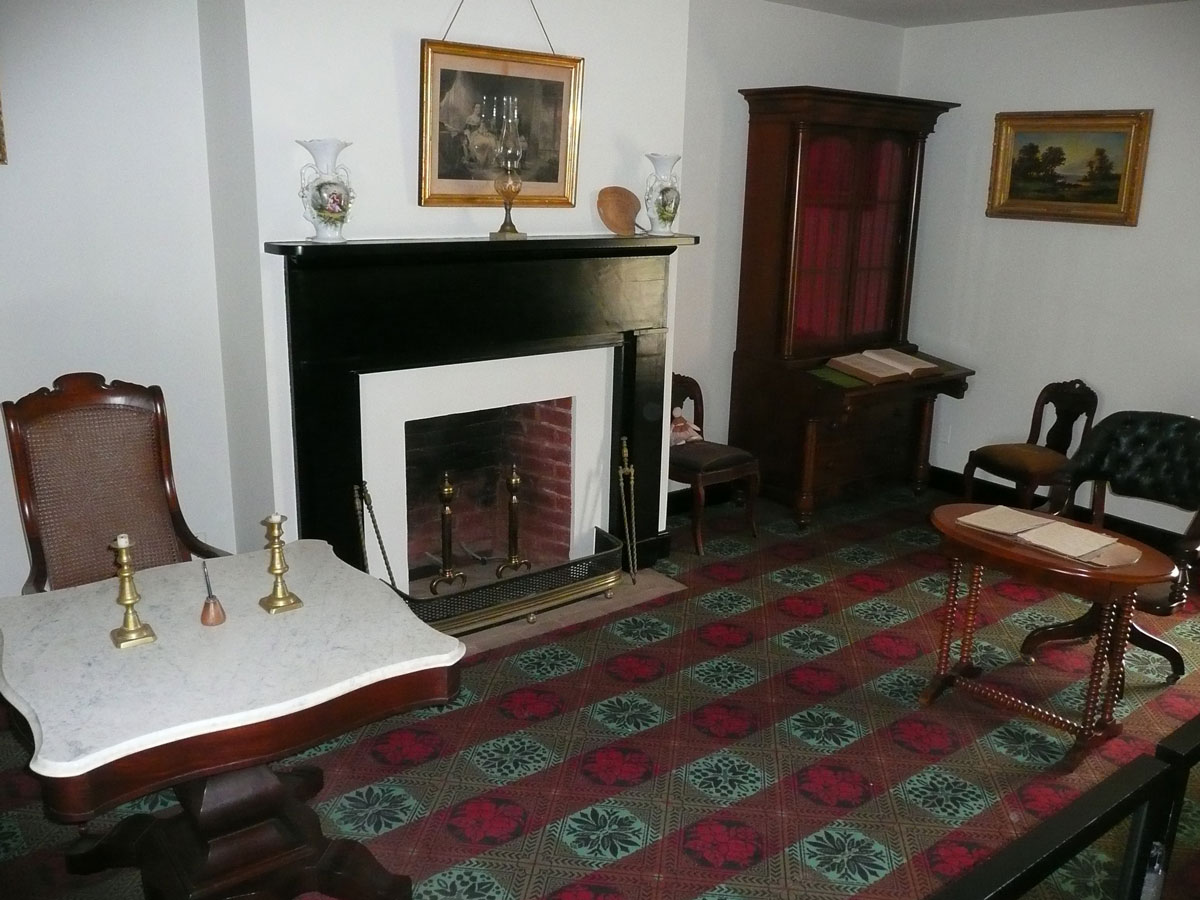
The parlor of the McLean House, where the Army of Northern Virginia surrendered

Due to slow communications, the Confederate forces in the Trans-Mississippi Theater did not receive word of the Confederate surrenders in the east for several weeks. The last organized engagement of the war was fought at Palmito Ranch, Texas on May 13 and 14 and resulted in a Confederate victory. Confederate Lieutenant General Edmund Kirby Smith, commander of the Trans-Mississippi Department, surrendered his forces at Shreveport, Louisiana, on June 2, while Confederate forces in the Indian Territory surrendered on June 23. The Confederate raider CSS Shenandoah, which had been in the Pacific Ocean during the months of April and May, only received word of the end of the war on August 2 from a British ship. Fearing execution as pirates if it surrendered to Union forces, the ship instead sailed to Liverpool, United Kingdom, and surrendered to British authorities on November 6.

== Engagements ==
Date	Engagement	Military units	Notes	Losses	Outcome
January 8	Dove Creek, Texas	Confederate District of Texas, Kickapoo tribe		Confederate 49, Kickapoo unknown	Kickapoo Indian Victory
January 13 – 15	Fort Fisher II, North Carolina	Union Terry's Provisional Corps, Department of Virginia and North Carolina, Confederate Department of North Carolina, Cape Fear District		Union 1,207 to 1,627 Confederate 400 to 500 killed and wounded 1,400 to 1,500 prisoners	Union victory
February 2 – 3	Rivers Bridge, South Carolina	Union Grand Army of the West, Confederate Military Division of the West		Union 92 killed and wounded, Confederate 170 killed and wounded	Union victory
February 5–7	Hatcher's Run, Virginia	Union Army of the Potomac, Confederate Army of Northern Virginia		Union 1,559, Confederate 1,000	Union victory
February 19–20	Town Creek, N.C.	Union Third Division, XXIII Corps, Confederate infantry brigade, Cape Fear District, Department of North Carolina		Union unknown, Confederate 395	
February 20	Forks Road, N.C.	Union Terry's Provisional Corps, Department of North Carolina, Confederate Cape Fear District, Department of North Carolina		Union 53, Confederate unknown	
March 2	Waynesboro, Virginia	Union Army of the Shenandoah, Confederate Army of the Valley District		Union 30, Confederate 1,600	Union victory
March 6	Battle of Natural Bridge, Florida	Union Department of the Gulf, Confederate volunteers		Union 148, Confederate 25	Confederate victory
March 7–10	Wyse Fork, North Carolina	Union Grand Army of the West, Confederate Department of North Carolina		Union 1,300, Confederate 1,500	Tactical Union victory, Strategic Confederate victory
March 10	Monroe's Cross Roads, North Carolina	Union 3rd Cavalry Division, Grand Army of the West, Confederate Hampton's Cavalry command, Army of the South		Union 183, Confederate 86	Inconclusive
March 16	Averasborough, North Carolina	Union Grand Army of the West, Confederate Department of South Carolina, Georgia and Florida		Union 683, Confederate 865	Inconclusive
March 19–21	Bentonville, North Carolina	Union Grand Army of the West, Confederate Army of the South		Union 1,527, Confederate 2,606	Union victory
March 24	Cox's Bridge, North Carolina	Union X Corps, Confederate Army of the South		Union 14, Confederate unknown	
March 25	Fort Stedman, Virginia	Union Army of the Potomac, Confederate Army of Northern Virginia		Union 1,017, Confederate 2,681	Union victory
March 27 – April 8	Spanish Fort, Alabama	Union Department of the Gulf, Confederate Department of East Louisiana, Mississippi and Alabama		Union 657, Confederate 741	Union victory
March 29	Lewis's Farm, Virginia	Union Army of the Potomac, Confederate Army of Northern Virginia		Union 381, Confederate 371	Union victory
March 31	Dinwiddle Court House, Virginia	Union Army of the Shenendoah, Confederate Army of Northern Virginia		Union 354, Confederate 760	Confederate victory
March 31	White Oak Road, Virginia	Union V Corps, Army of the Potomac, Confederate Army of Northern Virginia		Union 1,781, Confederate 900 to 1,235	Union victory
March 31	Johnson County, Tennessee	Union and Confederate irregulars		Union 1, Confederate 15	
April 1	Five Forks, Virginia	Union Army of the Shenandoah, Confederate Army of Northern Virginia		Union 830, Confederate 3,000	Union victory
April 2–9	Fort Blakeley, Alabama	Union Department of the Gulf, Confederate Department of East Louisiana, Mississippi and Alabama		Union 775, Confederate 3,700	Union victory
April 2	Selma, Alabama	Union Cavalry Corps, Military Division of the West, Confederate Forrest's Cavalry Corps		Union 35,9 Confederate 2,700	Union victory
April 2	Petersburg III, Virginia	Union Armies of the Potomac, the Shenandoah, and the James, Confederate Army of Northern Virginia		Union 3,894, Confederate 4,852	Union victory
April 2	Sutherland Station, Virginia	Union Army of the Potomac, Confederate Army of Northern Virginia		Union 366, Confederate 600	Union victory
April 3	Namozine Church, Virginia	Union Army of the Potomac, Confederate Army of Northern Virginia		Union 81, Confederate unknown	Inconclusive
April 5	Amelia Springs, Virginia	Union Army of the Potomac, Confederate Army of Northern Virginia		Union 158, Confederate unknown	Inconclusive
April 6	Sayler's Creek, Virginia	Union Army of the Potomac, Confederate Army of Northern Virginia		Union 1,148, Confederate 7,700	Union victory
April 6	Rice's Station, Virginia	Union Army of the Potomac, Confederate Army of Northern Virginia		Union 66, Confederate unknown	Union victory
April 6–7	High Bridge, Virginia	Union Army of the Potomac, Confederate Army of Northern Virginia		Union 847, Confederate 100	Inconclusive
April 7	Cumberland Church, Virginia	Union Army of the Potomac and Confederate Army of Northern Virginia		Union 571, Confederate unknown	Confederate victory
April 8	Appomattox Station, Virginia	Union Army of the Potomac and Confederate Army of Northern Virginia		Union 48, Confederate 1,000 captured unknown killed and wounded	Union victory
April 9	Dingle's Mill, South Carolina	Union expedition, Department of the South and Confederate militia and regulars		Union unknown, Confederate unknown	Union victory
April 9	Appomattox Court House, Virginia	Union Armies of the Potomac, the James, and the Shenandoah and Confederate Army of Northern Virginia		Union 164, Confederate 500	Decisive Union victory
April 10	Moccasin Creek, North Carolina	Union XX Corps, Army of Georgia, Confederate Army of Tennessee		Union 7, Confederate unknown	
April 12	Stalling's Station and Swift Creek, North Carolina	Cavalry from Union Military Division of the West and Confederate Army of Tennessee		unknown	
April 13	Morrisville, North Carolina	Cavalry from Union Military Division of the West and Confederate Army of Tennessee		unknown	Union victory
April 16	West Point, Georgia	Union Wilson's Cavalry Corps and Confederate militia and artillerymen		Union 36, Confederate 264	Union victory
April 18	Boykin's Mill, South Carolina	Union expedition, Department of the South and Confederate militia		Union 2, Confederate unknown	Union victory
April 26	Garrett's farm, south of Port Royal, Virginia	Union troop from 16th New York Cavalry Regiment under the leadership of Edward P. Doherty, two assassins/ confederate sympathizers	Marker at Site of John Wilkes Booth's capture in 1865. An attempt was made to capture the Southern assassins, John Wilkes Booth, the perpetrator of the assassination of Abraham Lincoln, and David Herold, his associate at Garetts Farm. David Herold surrendered to Union forces but John Wilkes Booth decided to fight. The tobacco barn where they were hiding was set on fire by soldiers and Booth was killed by Sergeant Boston Corbett.	Union 0, Confederate sympathizers 1 killed and 1 captured, Civilian casualties: Garetts tobacco barn burned.	Death of John Wilkes Booth
May 6	Waynesville, North Carolina	Confederate Thomas' Legion, Union 2nd North Carolina Mounted Rifles		unknown	
May 12–13	Palmito Ranch, Texas	Union Department of the Gulf and Confederate Department of the Trans-Mississippi, Subdistrict of the Rio Grande	Often considered the last battle of the Civil War.	Union 30, Confederate 6-7	Confederate victory
May 19	Hobdy's Bridge, Alabama	Hobdy's Bridge, Eufaula, Alabama	According to some people, the last battle/skirmish of the Civil War.	Union 1, Confederate unknown	Inconclusive
May 26	Sea of Okhotsk, near Russia	CSS Shenandoah		Capture of Union whaling ship	
June 22–23	Bering Sea, near the coast of Alaska	CSS Shenandoah		Capture of seven U.S. whaling ships	
June 26	Bering Sea, near the coast of Alaska	CSS Shenandoah		Capture of six U.S. whaling ships.	
June 28	East Cape Bay, Alaska	CSS Shenandoah		Capture of eleven U.S. whaling ships	

== See also ==
- Conclusion of the American Civil War

== Sources ==
- Bradley, Mark L. This Astounding Close: The Road to Bennett Place. Chapel Hill, North Carolina: University of North Carolina Press, 2000. ISBN 0-8078-2565-4.
- Calkins, Chris M. The Appomtattox Campaign: March 29 – April 9, 1865. Conshohocken, Pennsylvania: Combined Books, Inc., 1997. ISBN 0-938289-54-3.
- Crow, Vernon. "The Thomas Legion", in Civil War Times Illustrated, Vol. XI, no. 3 (June 1971), pp. 40–45. ISSN 0009-8094.
- Fonvielle, Jr., Chris E. Last Rays of Departing Hope: The Wilmington Campaign. Campbell, California: Savas Publishing Company, 1997. ISBN 1-882810-09-0.
- Gragg, Rod. Confederate Goliath: The Battle of Fort Fisher. New York: Harper Collins, 1991. ISBN 0-06-016096-9.
- Hughes, Jr., Nathaniel Cheairs. Bentonville: The Final Battle of Sherman & Johnston. Chapel Hill, North Carolina: University of North Carolina Press, 1996. ISBN 0-8078-2281-7.
- Kennedy, Frances H. The Civil War Battlefield Guide, Second Edition. New York: Houghton Mifflin Company, 1998. ISBN 0-395-74012-6.
- Smith, David Paul. Frontier Defense in the Civil War: Texas' Rangers and Rebels. College Station, Texas: Texas A&M University Press, 1992. ISBN 0-89096-484-X.
- Trudeau, Noah Andre. Out of the Storm: The End of the Storm, April–June 1865. Boston, Massachusetts: Little, Brown and Company, 1994. ISBN 0-316-85328-3.
