= Henry S. Finkenbiner =

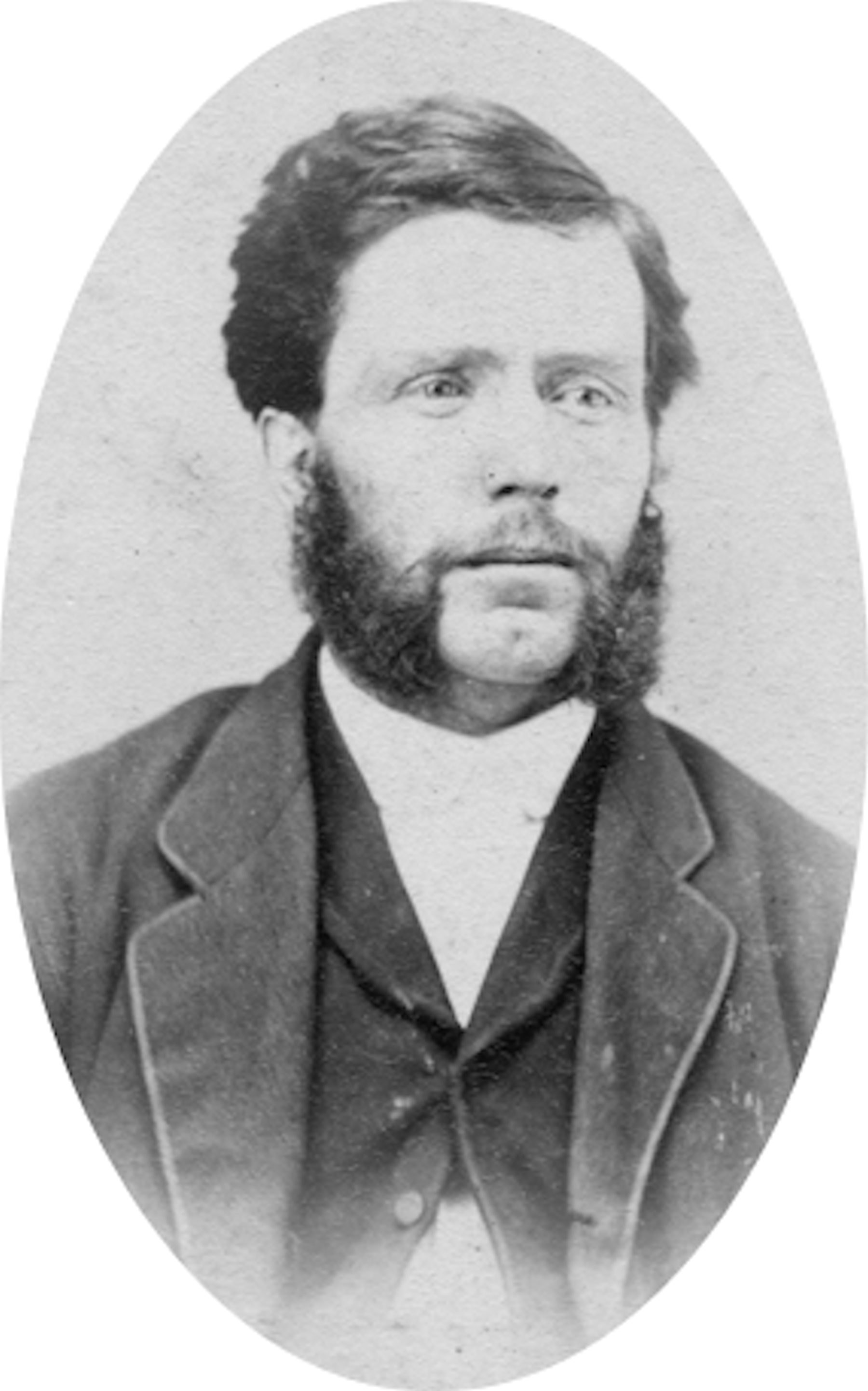
- Born: July 29, 1842; North Industry, Ohio, US
- Died: June 3, 1922 (aged 79); Lagro, Indiana, US
- Burial place: Hopewell Cemetery
- Military career
- Allegiance: United States of America
- Branch: United States Army
- Rank: Private
- Units: Company D, 107th Ohio Volunteer Infantry Regiment
- Awards: Medal of Honor

Private Henry S. Finkenbiner (July 29, 1842 – June 3, 1922) was an American soldier who fought in the American Civil War. Finkenbiner received the country's highest award for bravery during combat, the Medal of Honor, for his action at Dingle's Mill in South Carolina on 9 April 1865. He was honored with the award on 30 March 1898.

== Biography ==
Finkenbiner was born in North Industry, Ohio on 29 July 1842 the son of George and Susannah Stands Finkenbiner. He enlisted into the 107th Ohio Infantry. He served as a Corporal in Company D, 107th Ohio Volunteer Infantry Regiment (103rd OVI).

Finkenbiner and the 107th OVI spent their service with the Army of the Potomac until August 1863 when they transferred to the Department of the South and operated there until the end of the war. He was awarded the Medal of Honor for action on April 9, 1865, at Dingles Mill, South Carolina.

After the war he returned to Ohio and in 1868, married Amanda Ellen Stoops Finkenbiner (1848–1882) with whom he had seven children, four girls (two of whom died in childhood) and three boys:

- Dora Emmett Finkenbiner 1869–1940
- George Elmer Finkenbiner 1871–1943
- Ida M Finkenbiner Grindle 1873–1914
- Daisy Nevada Finkenbiner 1875–1877
- John Stands Finkenbiner 1876–1949
- Arthur Clinton Finkenbiner 1879–1965
- Minnie Myrtle Finkenbiner 1882–1893

After her death, he married Nancy Eliza Miller Finkenbiner 1858–1911 with whom he had a son:

- Walter Howard Finkenbiner 1886–1931

He received his Medal of Honor on March 30, 1898.

In 1911, his second wife, Nancy, died, and he married a third time to a widow, Lorane Smith Myer Finkenbiner, 1843–1917. Widowed a third time in 1917, he died on 3 June 1922 having outlived his wives and four of his children. His remains are interred at the Hopewell Cemetery in Indiana.

== Medal of Honor citation ==
The President of the United States of America, in the name of Congress, takes pleasure in presenting the Medal of Honor to Private Henry S. Finkenbiner, United States Army, for extraordinary heroism on 9 April 1865, while serving with Company D, 107th Ohio Infantry, in action at Dingle's Mill, South Carolina. While on the advance skirmish line and within direct and close fire of the enemy's artillery, Private Finkenbiner crossed the mill race on a burning bridge and ascertained the enemy's position.

== See also ==
- List of American Civil War Medal of Honor recipients: A–F
