= Francis H. West =

19th century American politician and Union Army colonel

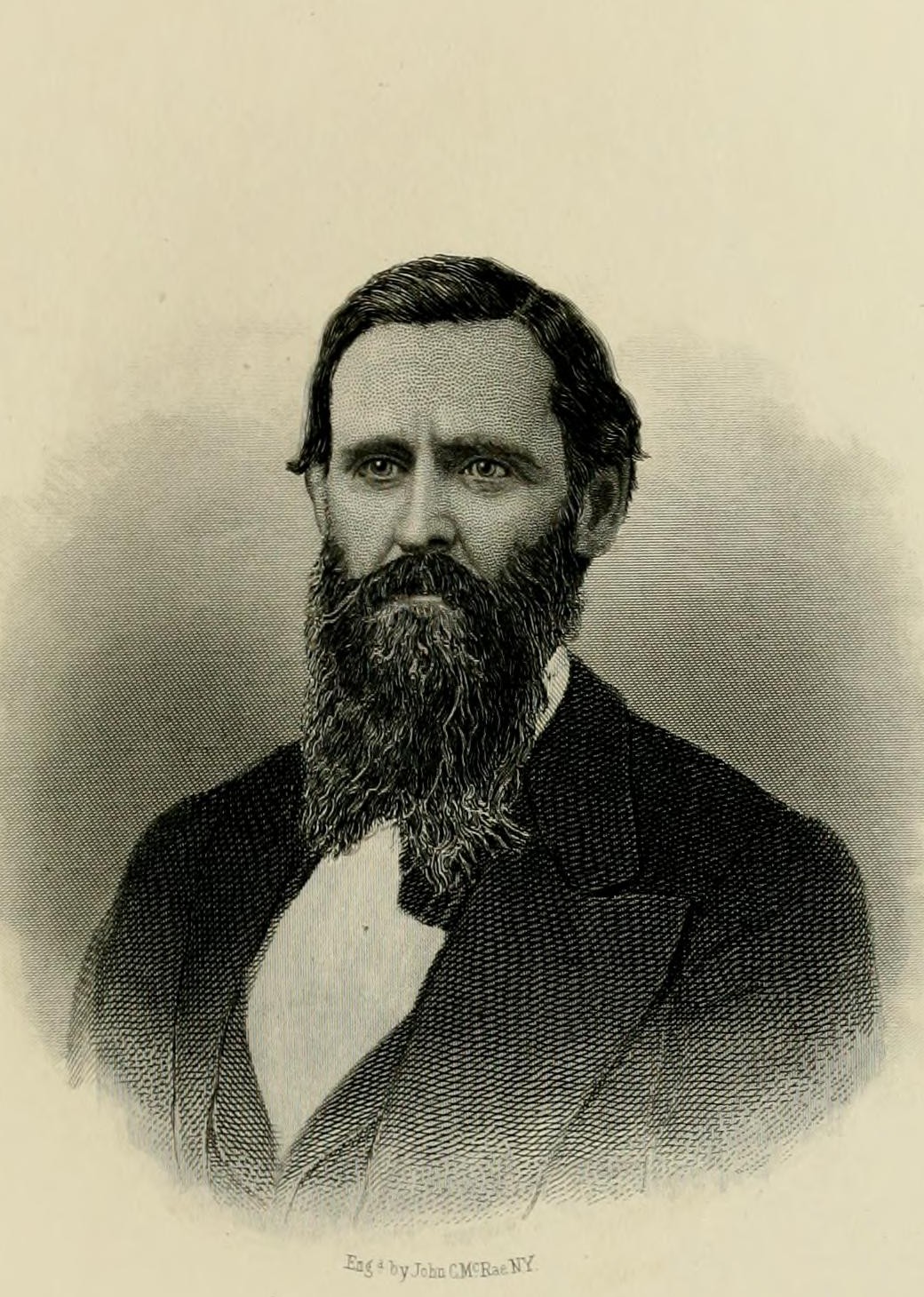
- Portrait from the United States biographical dictionary and portrait gallery of eminent and self-made men; Wisconsin volume (1877)

Member of the Wisconsin Senate from the 24th district
- In office January 1, 1854 – January 1, 1856
- Preceded by: Thomas S. Bowen
- Succeeded by: George E. Dexter

Member of the Wisconsin State Assembly from the Milwaukee 7th district
- In office January 1, 1874 – January 1, 1875
- Preceded by: Henry L. Palmer
- Succeeded by: Lemuel Ellsworth

Personal details
- Born: Francis Henry West; October 25, 1825 Charlestown, New Hampshire, U.S.
- Died: March 6, 1896 (aged 70) Bessemer, Alabama, U.S.
- Resting place: Forest Home Cemetery; Milwaukee, Wisconsin
- Party: Democratic; Reform (1873); Republican (1855)
- Spouse: Emma Moore Rittenhouse (m. 1849–1896)
- Relatives: Frederick F. West (brother); Edmund A. West (fifth cousin); E. B. West (fifth cousin)
- Profession: merchant

Military service
- Allegiance: United States
- Branch/service: United States Volunteers; Union Army
- Years of service: 1862–1865
- Rank: Colonel, USV; Brevet Brig. General, USV
- Commands: 31st Reg. Wis. Vol. Infantry
- Battles/wars: American Civil War; Atlanta Campaign; Savannah Campaign; Carolinas Campaign; Battle of Averasborough; Battle of Bentonville

Francis Henry West (October 25, 1825 – March 6, 1896) was an American businessman, politician, and Wisconsin pioneer. He was a member of the Wisconsin Legislature for three years, and served as a Union Army officer during the American Civil War, earning an honorary brevet to brigadier general.

== Early life and career ==
West was born in Charlestown, New Hampshire. He moved to the Wisconsin Territory in 1845, eventually settling in Monroe, in Green County, in 1846. In Green County, he worked in the lumber industry.

In 1853, he was elected as a Democrat to represent Green County in the Wisconsin State Senate for the 1854 and 1855 sessions. In 1855, he was the Republican nominee for Bank Comptroller, but was not successful.

In 1859 and 1860, he accompanied parties of migrants from New York to California.

== Civil War ==
West joined the Army on August 28, 1862, and was commissioned a lieutenant colonel with the 31st Wisconsin Volunteer Infantry Regiment, which was still being organized in Wisconsin. The 31st Wisconsin was created from two volunteer battalions from Crawford County and Racine. The 31st mustered into service in October 1862 and left Wisconsin in March 1863.

=== Kentucky and Tennessee ===
The 31st traveled to Kentucky via Cairo, Illinois, and was attached to the XVI Army Corps. They spent the summer of 1863 on patrols and picket duty in southern Illinois, western Kentucky, protecting supply routes along the Mississippi River.

In September 1863, they were ordered to Nashville. Here, their colonel, Isaac E. Messmore, resigned, and, on October 8, Lt. Colonel West was promoted to colonel of the 31st Wisconsin. Through the winter of 1863–64, the regiment was stationed at Murfreesboro, Tennessee, and continued to serve as protection for logistics and supplies. In April 1864, the 31st was attached to the XX Corps and split into detachments to protect a long stretch of railroad lines in Tennessee. In June, the regiment was ordered to consolidate and return to Nashville.

=== Georgia ===
On July 5, the 31st Wisconsin was ordered by General William Tecumseh Sherman to proceed to the front of the ongoing Atlanta campaign. The 31st traveled by train to Marietta, Georgia, and reached its position on the line July 21. The regiment worked on constructing siege fortifications around Atlanta and came under frequent enemy fire due to their proximity to the enemy lines. The regiment did not take part in the actual battle, but was one of the first units to enter the city. The regiment was assigned to provide security in the city and protect foraging operations in the surrounding area.

On November 15, 1864, the XX Corps broke camp and marched out of the city to begin their part in Sherman's March to the Sea (the Savannah Campaign). They advanced without encountering any resistance until ten miles outside Savannah. There, on December 9, they encountered two small enemy fortifications. The 31st Wisconsin, along with the 61st Ohio, were ordered to flank the position through a thick swamp. They passed the swamp and charged the enemy, taking the position with light casualties. For their action, they received the compliments of General Sherman. The regiment joined the siege of Savannah, and after capturing the city were assigned quarters there.

=== Carolinas ===
On January 18, 1865, the 31st Wisconsin departed Savannah and marched for Purrysburg, South Carolina, at the start of the Carolinas campaign. The regiment proceeded through South Carolina, burning enemy facilities, tearing up railroad tracks, and pushing the enemy's rear guard toward North Carolina.

On March 1, the 31st advanced toward Chesterfield, South Carolina, near the border with North Carolina. They forced a small confederate force to flee north, then stopped in the village. On March 16, the 31st took position on the front line for Averasborough, where they were shelled and took casualties. Three days later, they were in the advance on approach to Bentonville, along with two other regiments, where they encountered significant Confederate opposition and found their flanks exposed. They fell back and formed a defensive position with elements of the XIV and XX Corps. The Confederates attacked their position five times and were repelled in fierce fighting. This was the worst fighting that they saw during the war, and suffered ten killed and forty-two wounded.

On March 24, they reached Goldsboro, North Carolina, where they stopped to rest and re-equip. While the 31st was camped at Goldsboro, Ulysses S. Grant accepted the surrender of Robert E. Lee at Appomattox. On April 10, the 31st marched out to continue their advance toward Raleigh, pursuing Joseph E. Johnston and the remnants of the Army of the South. But before they reached Raleigh, they received word that Johnston had surrendered to Sherman and the war was effectively over.

The 31st was ordered back to Washington, where they participated in the Grand Review of the Armies in May, and West mustered out on June 20, 1865. While in Washington, U.S. President Andrew Johnson nominated Colonel West for an honorary brevet to brigadier general of volunteers for gallant service in the field, effective back to March 19, 1865, the day of their combat at Bentonville. The United States Senate confirmed the brevet on March 12, 1866.

== Postbellum years ==
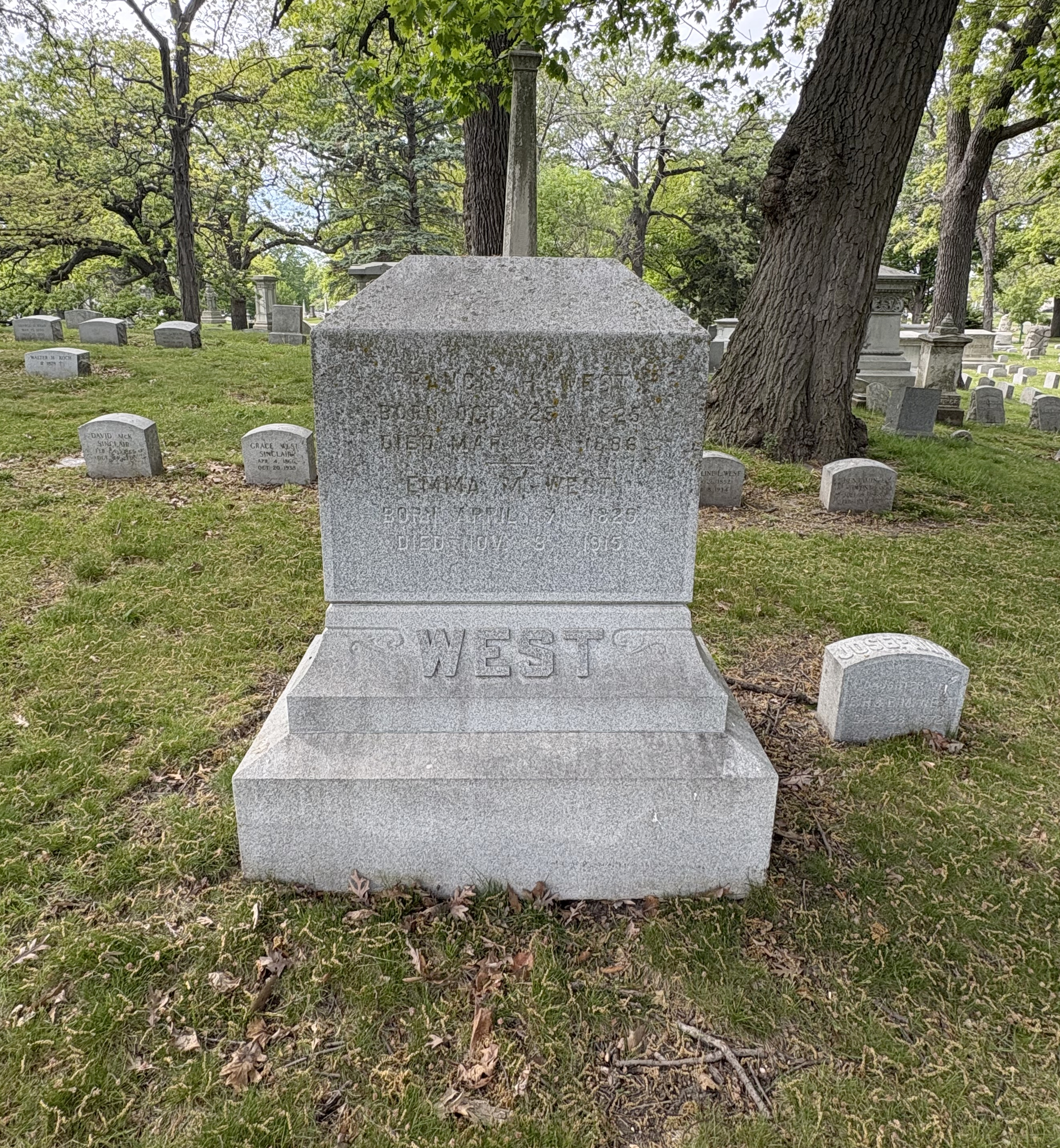
West's grave at Forest Home Cemetery

After the war, General West moved to Milwaukee County and entered a partnership—Fowler & West—with James S. Fowler in the grain commission business. He served for six years on the board of directors of the Milwaukee Chamber of Commerce, including two years as president.

In 1873, he was elected on the Reform ticket to represent Northern Milwaukee County in the Wisconsin State Assembly for the 1874 session. The Reform Party was a short-lived coalition of Democrats, reformers, Liberal Republicans, and Grangers. Their signature accomplishment was the 1874 "Potter Law," 1874 Wisconsin Act 273—named for Republican state senator Robert L. D. Potter—which established a new state Railroad Commission to aggressively regulate railroad and freight fees. In the Assembly, Colonel West served on the Committee on Railroads and the Committee on State Affairs.

General West did not seek re-election in 1874.

During Grover Cleveland's first presidential term, West was appointed United States Marshal for the Milwaukee district. After completing this final public service, Colonel West retired to Alabama, where two of his sons lived.

While on a trip to New York, in 1896, West slipped while attempting to step off of a street car and was severely injured. He was confined to his bed for several days before he was healthy enough to return to Alabama. He died a few weeks later, on March 6, 1896, at Bessemer, Alabama. He was buried at Forest Home Cemetery, in Milwaukee.

== Personal life and family ==
Francis H. West was the second of four children born to Enoch Hammond West and his wife Lydia (née Fitch). Both of Francis's brothers, Frederick and Charles, also came to Green County, Wisconsin, and were active in local politics. The West family were descended from Francis West, a carpenter who came to Massachusetts Bay Colony from England in the 1630s.

Francis West married Emma Moore Rittenhouse in June 1849. They had at least eight children together, though at least one died young.

His former home at Monroe, Wisconsin, now known as the General Francis H. West House, is listed on the National Register of Historic Places.

== Electoral history ==
=== Wisconsin Bank Comptroller (1855) ===
Wisconsin Bank Comptroller Election, 1855
Party	Candidate	Votes	%	±%
General Election, November 6, 1855
Democratic	William M. Dennis (incumbent)	38,625	52.07%	−3.52%
Republican	Francis H. West	35,561	47.93%	
Plurality		3,064	4.13%	-7.41%
Total votes		74,186	100.0%	+34.09%
Democratic hold				

=== Wisconsin Senate (1861) ===
Wisconsin Senate, 24th District Election, 1861
Party	Candidate	Votes	%	±%
General Election, November 5, 1861
Republican	Edmund A. West	1,228	57.68%	−0.48%
National Union	Francis H. West	901	42.32%	
Plurality		327	15.36%	-0.95%
Total votes		2,129	100.0%	-24.18%
Republican hold				

=== Wisconsin Assembly (1874) ===
Wisconsin Assembly, Milwaukee 7th District Election, 1873
Party	Candidate	Votes	%	±%
General Election, November 4, 1873
Reform	Francis H. West	705	65.04%	
Republican	John Hubbard Tweedy	379	34.96%	
Total votes		1,084	100.0%	
Reform gain from Democratic				
