= Harper House (Harper, North Carolina) =

Building in North Carolina, United States

- U.S. National Register of Historic Places
- U.S. Historic district – Contributing property
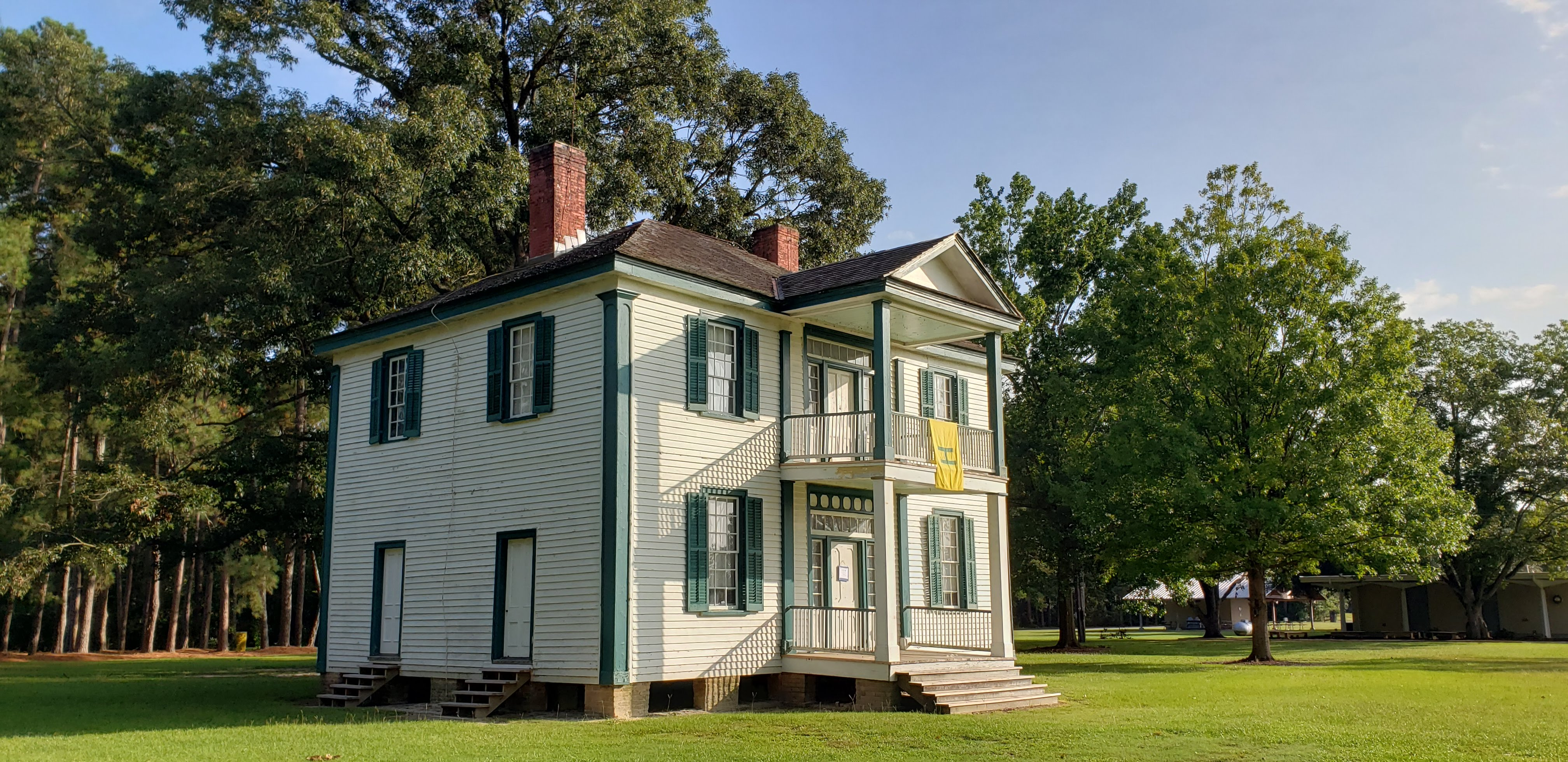
- Main façade of the Harper House

- Location within North Carolina
- Coordinates: 35°18′5″N 78°19′57″W
- Area: 1 acre (0.40 ha)
- Built: c. 1850
- Architectural style: Greek Revival
- NRHP reference No.: 70000459
- Added to NRHP: February 26, 1970

Harper House is a historic home located near Four Oaks, Johnston County, North Carolina. It was built about 1855, and is a two-story, three-bay, vernacular Greek Revival style frame dwelling. It sits on the original brick pier foundation and has a hipped roof and interior end chimneys. The front facade features a two-story pedimented portico. The house served as a Union field hospital during the Battle of Bentonville (March 19–21, 1865) and is located adjacent to the Bentonville Battlefield state historic site visitors center, which offers tours of its interior. It was bought by the state in 1957. Before the state's acquisition of the property, it was privately owned by the Dunn family, and before them the Thorntons. It served as a home for 6 of the Harper children, and two of the Harpers grandchildren during the battle.

It was listed on the National Register of Historic Places in 1970. It is located in the Bentonville Battleground State Historic Site.
