= William Alexander McQueen =

William Alexander McQueen was born and raised in Sumterville, South Carolina. His father The Reverend Dr. Archebald Alexander McQueen was the pastor (& the longest serving pastor) of the First Presbyterian Church in Sumterville (the township later was called "Sumter").

McQueen's bronze 12 pound field howitzer was one of five Confederate cannon that went forward in support of Pickett's Charge. He was a distinguished officer and a veteran of many battles in Virginia including the Battle of Gettysburg with Garden's Battery of the Palmetto Artillery.

His was one of the two Confederate States of America Artillery Officers that put into place two Quaker Cannon and two 12-pounders for the defense of the Battle of Dingle's Mill.

He was home at the time, recovering from a serious wound in the side from the Battle of Darbytown Road, near Richmond, Virginia, on October 7, 1864. Young men and their teacher from the local Military School participated, but Lt McQueen was killed by cannon fire during the Battle of Dingle's Mill, as well, with a shot to the shoulder. None of the people in the battle or in town were aware that the Official Surrender of the Confederate Forces had occurred in Virginia that very morning. As all telegraph lines were down the Union or Confederate forces in this engagement were not aware and many lives were lost this day. This engagement was the last battle of the Civil War in South Carolina.

For his acts of unselfish heroism and gallantry in Garden's Battery, Palmetto Light Artillery, in 1977 he was posthumously awarded the Confederate Medal of Honor by the Sons of Confederate Veterans.
