= E. B. West =

American politician (1804–1854)

Member of the Wisconsin Senate from the 13th district
- In office January 15, 1852 – January 3, 1853
- Preceded by: George Hyer
- Succeeded by: Charles Dunn

Personal details
- Born: c.1804 Pennsylvania, U.S.
- Died: February 3, 1854 (aged 49) Waukesha, Wisconsin, U.S.
- Resting place: Prairie Home Cemetery, Waukesha, Wisconsin
- Party: Whig
- Spouse: Sarah S. Sterling (m. 1833–1854)
- Children: Frederick West^{(b. 1835)}; Theodore West^{(b. 1836)}; Edmund B. West Jr.^{(b. 1849)}; Julius S. West^{(b. 1852; died 1919)}
- Relatives: Edmund A. West (fourth cousin); Francis H. West (fifth cousin)
- Education: University of Pennsylvania
- Profession: Dentist, physician, surgeon

Edmund B. West (c.1804 – February 3, 1854) was an American dentist, medical doctor, surgeon, and Wisconsin pioneer. He was one of the first dentists in the Wisconsin Territory, and went on to serve one year in the Wisconsin State Senate, representing Waukesha County.

== Biography ==
Edmund B. West was born in Pennsylvania, likely in 1804 (during his term in the Wisconsin State Senate, he was noted as being the eldest member of the Senate at age 47, as of January 1852). He was educated at the University of Pennsylvania in Philadelphia, and worked as a medical doctor in Wyoming County, Pennsylvania, from 1825 until 1841. While residing in Wyoming County, he was active in politics as a leader of the local chapter of the Anti-Masonic Party, a forerunner of the Whig Party.

He arrived in the city of Milwaukee around 1843 and began operating as a dentist and dental surgeon. At the time, he was one of the first professional dentists operating in the Wisconsin Territory. Around 1847, he moved west to the town of Waukesha, where he operated as a general physician and surgeon.

Dr. West was first referenced in Wisconsin's political affairs in 1848, when he wrote as an advocate for Waukesha County physicians about what they saw as overly onerous state rules regarding the medical practice in the new state. In 1850, he was the Whig Party's nominee for Wisconsin State Assembly in Waukesha County's 4th State Assembly district (Waukesha and New Berlin). He was defeated by Democrat William A. Cone in that general election.

A year later, State Senator George Hyer announced his resignation from the Senate in the middle of his term. Dr. West was selected as the Whig nominee for the January 1852 special election; the Free Soil Party, satisfied with his state position opposing the expansion of slavery and opposing the Fugitive Slave Act of 1850, chose to endorse his candidacy rather than running their own candidate. West won a narrow victory over Democrat William H. Thomas, in what was then a fairly reliable Democratic district, and represented Waukesha County in the Wisconsin State Senate for the 5th Wisconsin Legislature.

The status of the Wisconsin Supreme Court was a considered issue during the 1852 legislative session, as corruption charges had been brought to the Legislature by attorney Edward G. Ryan—who would become a member of the court 20 years later. Dr. West was assigned to a three-member committee to investigate, but found no merit to the charges. Nevertheless, shortly thereafter, the Legislature voted to abolish the current Supreme Court—which was simply composed of the state circuit court judges—and establish a new three-member Supreme Court to be elected by statewide popular vote.

1852 also saw the incorporation of the Village of Waukesha and the first election of village officers. West was a candidate for Village President in the first election that summer, but fell 7 votes short of Nelson Burrows.

The 1852 Legislature also performed the first legislative redistricting of the state, and Waukesha County was subsequently divided into two Senate districts as the State Senate expanded from 19 members to 25. West ran for a full term in the new 10th Senate district, which covered the southern half of Waukesha County. This time, the Free Soil Party ran their own candidate in the race, Reverend Henry H. Van Amringe. In the three-way race, Dr. West came in a distant 3rd, with the Democrat, Marvin H. Bovee, winning the seat.

Dr. West died one year after leaving office, on February 3, 1854, at his residence in Waukesha, after an illness of several months.

== Personal life and family ==
E. B. West was the sixth of nine children born to Elias West and his wife Mary "Polly" (née Armstrong). The Wests were descendants of Francis West, a carpenter who came to the Massachusetts Bay Colony from England in the 1630s.

== Electoral history ==
=== Wisconsin Assembly (1850) ===
Wisconsin Assembly, Waukesha 4th District Election, 1850
Party	Candidate	Votes	%
General Election, November 5, 1850
Democratic	William A. Cone	308	57.25%
Whig	E. B. West	230	42.75%
Plurality		78	14.50%
Total votes		538	100.0%
Democratic hold			

=== Wisconsin Senate, 13th district (1852) ===
Wisconsin Senate, 13th District Special Election, 1852
Party	Candidate	Votes	%
Special Election, January 7, 1852
Whig	E. B. West	992	54.39%
Democratic	William H. Thomas	821	45.01%
	Scattering	11	0.60%
Plurality		171	9.38%
Total votes		1,824	100.0%
Whig gain from Democratic			

=== Waukesha Village President (1852) ===
Waukesha Village President Election, 1852
Party	Candidate	Votes	%
Charter Election, June 30, 1852
Democratic	Nelson Burrows	127	50.20%
Whig	E. B. West	120	47.43%
Independent	S. S. Case	3	1.19%
Independent	John Bailey	1	0.40%
	Scattering	2	0.79%
Plurality		7	2.77%
Total votes		253	100.0%
Democratic win (new seat)			

=== Wisconsin Senate, 10th district (1852) ===
Wisconsin Senate, 10th District Election, 1852
Party	Candidate	Votes	%
General Election, November 2, 1852
Democratic	Marvin H. Bovee	801	44.38%
Free Soil	Henry H. Van Amringe	626	34.68%
Whig	E. B. West	378	20.94%
Plurality		175	9.70%
Total votes		1,805	100.0%
Democratic gain from Whig			

Wisconsin Senate
Preceded by George Hyer	Member of the Wisconsin Senate from the 13th district January 15, 1852 – January 3, 1853	Succeeded by Charles Dunn
