= Edward E. Potter =

Union Army officer (1823–1889)

Edward Elmer Potter
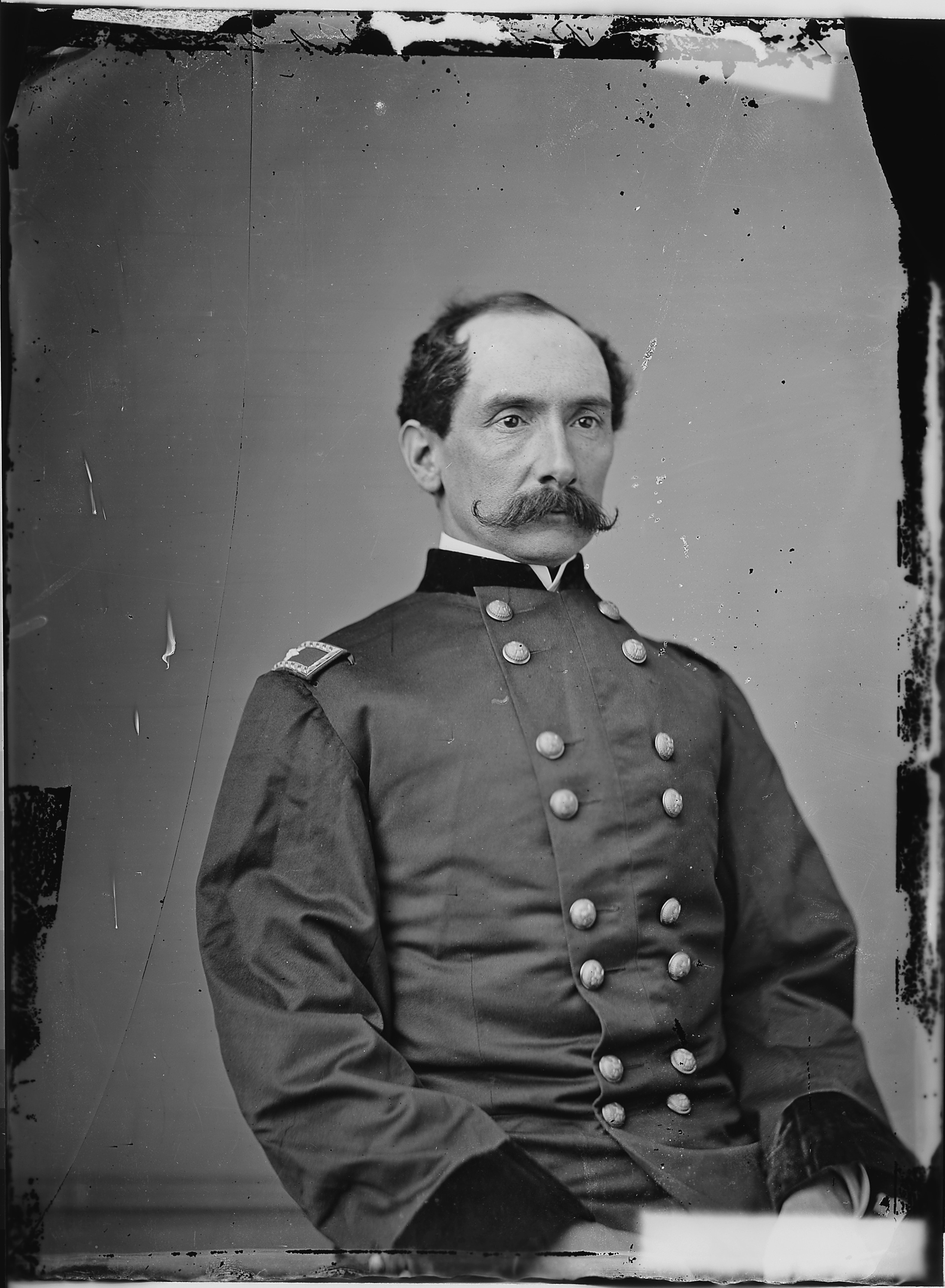
- Born: June 21, 1823; New York City, New York
- Died: June 1, 1889 (aged 65); New York City, New York
- Burial place: New York City Marble Cemetery, New York City, New York
- Military career
- Allegiance: United States
- Branch: United States Army
- Service years: 1862–1865
- Rank: Brigadier General; Brevet Major General
- Unit: 1st North Carolina Infantry Regiment
- Conflicts: American Civil War: Battle of Roanoke Island; Battle of New Bern; Battle of Washington; Battle of Honey Hill; Battle of Bean's Station; Battle of Honey Hill; Battle of Dingle's Mill
- Other work: farmer

Edward Elmer Potter (June 21, 1823 – June 1, 1889) was a Union Army officer during the American Civil War. Potter was primarily associated with operations conducted in North Carolina throughout the war.

== Biography ==
Potter was born in New York City and graduated from Columbia College. In 1849, he traveled to California at the time of the California Gold Rush. Returning to New York, he turned to farming up until the outbreak of the Civil War.

In February 1862, Potter was commissioned captain in the commissary department and was attached to John G. Foster's brigade during Burnside's North Carolina Expedition. In the wake of the Union occupation of the North Carolina coast, Potter was authorized to recruit the 1st North Carolina Infantry from loyal Union citizens around Washington, North Carolina. Potter was appointed lieutenant colonel on October 1, 1862 and was soon promoted to brigadier general of U.S. Volunteers dating from November 29, 1862.

When John G. Foster took command of the XVIII Corps, Potter became his chief of staff. During the siege of Washington, General Foster personally arrived in Washington to assume command of the defenses and was accompanied by General Potter. After several failed relief attempts, Foster escaped the city to lead the relief effort himself. Foster left Potter in immediate command of the city's defenses. Potter maintained the defense until the Confederates were compelled to withdraw.

Potter was afterward in command of the defenses of Norfolk and Portsmouth, but once again became chief of staff to General Foster when the latter was appointed to command of the Army of the Ohio. Potter's time in Tennessee was brief as he returned to the Atlantic coast in command of the District of Hilton Head four months later. In November 1864 he led a brigade into action at the Battle of Honey Hill and in 1865 organized raids into the interior of South Carolina and North Carolina. In 1865 he received a brevet promotion to major general of U.S. Volunteers dated 13 March.

== See also ==
- List of American Civil War generals (Union)
