= 107th Ohio Infantry Regiment =

- Active: September 9, 1862, to July 10, 1865
- Country: United States
- Allegiance: Union
- Branch: Infantry
- Engagements: Battle of Chancellorsville; Gettysburg campaign; Battle of Gettysburg; Siege of Fort Wagner; Battle of Dingle's Mill

The 107th Ohio Infantry Regiment, sometimes 107th Ohio Volunteer Infantry (or 107th OVI) was an infantry regiment in the Union Army during the American Civil War. It was also known as the 5th German Regiment.

== Service ==
The 107th Ohio Infantry was organized at Camp Taylor in Cleveland, Ohio, and mustered in for three years service on August 26, 1862, under the command of Colonel Seraphim Meyer.

The regiment was attached to the following:

- 2nd Brigade, 3rd Division, XI Corps, Army of the Potomac, to December 1862.
- 2nd Brigade, 1st Division, XI Corps, to July 1863.
- 1st Brigade, 1st Division, XI Corps, to August 1863.
- 1st Brigade, Gordon's Division, Folly Island, South Carolina, X Corps, Department of the South, to January 1864.
- 2nd Brigade, Gordon's Division, Folly Island, South Carolina, Northern District, Department of the South, to February 1864.
- 1st Brigade, Ames' Division, District of Florida, Department of the South, to April 1864.
- District of Florida, Department of the South, to October 1864.
- 4th Separate Brigade, District of Florida, Department of the South, to November 1864.
- 1st Brigade, Coast Division, Department of the South, to December 1864.
- 3rd Separate Brigade, Department of the South, to January 1865.
- 1st Separate Brigade, Northern District, Department of the South, to March 1865.
- 1st Separate Brigade, District of Charleston, Department of the South, to July 1865.

=== Detailed service ===
The 107th OVI's detailed service is as follows (NOTE — Battles are Bolded, Italicized; campaigns are Italicized):

==== 1862 ====
- Moved to Covington, Ky., September 28.
- Duty in the defenses of Cincinnati, Ohio, until October 5, 1862.
- At Delaware, Ohio, October 5–12.
- Ordered to Washington, D.C., October 12.
- Duty in the defenses of Washington, D.C., until December 1862.
- March to Fredericksburg, Va.
- To support of Burnside December 8–15.

==== 1863 ====
- Burnside's 2nd Campaign, "Mud March," January 20–24, 1863.
- At Stafford Court House until April.
- Chancellorsville Campaign April 27-May 6.
- **Battle of Chancellorsville** May 1–5.
- Gettysburg campaign June 11-July 24.
- **Battle of Gettysburg** July 1–3.
- Pursuit of Lee to Manassas Gap, Va., July 5–24
- **Battle of Hagerstown**, Md., July 11–13.
- Ordered to Department of the South and sailed for Folly Island, S.C., August 1.
- Siege operations against Fort Wagner, Morris Island, S.C., August 9-September 7.
- Picket and fatigue duty on Folly Island, S.C., and operating against Charleston, S.C., until February 1864.

==== 1864 ====
- Expedition to Johns and James Islands February 6–14.
- Moved to Jacksonville, Fla., February 23.
- Duty there and in the District of Florida until December.
- Skirmishing near Jacksonville May 1 and 28.
- Expedition from Jacksonville to Camp Milton May 31-June 3.
- **Battle of Bloody Bridge** July 5–7
- At Fernandina, Fla., July–August.
- Return to Jacksonville and duty there until December.
- Moved to South Carolina December 5.
- **Battle of Deveaux Neck** Dec 6-9
- **Pocotaligo Bridge** December 29.

==== 1865 ====
- Expedition to destroy Charleston & Savannah Railroad January 14–16, 1865.
- **Battle of Enterprise** February 5.
- Occupation of Charleston March 10.
- Potter's Expedition to Camden, S.C., April 5–25.
- Operations about Sumter and Statesburg April 9–15.
- **Battle of Dingle's Mill**, April 9, 1865
- Statesburg April 15.
- Occupation of Camden April 17.
- Boykin's Mills April 18.
- Denkin's Mills, Beech Creek, near Statesburg, and **Battle of Swift Creek** April 19.
- Provost duty at Georgetown and at Charleston until July.

== Casualties ==
The regiment lost a total of 133 men during service; 3 officers and 54 enlisted men killed or mortally wounded, 2 officers and 74 enlisted men died of disease.

== Commanders ==
- Colonel Seraphim Meyer
- Lieutenant Colonel Charles Mueller - commanded at the battle of Chancellorsville
- Captain John M. Lutz - commanded at the battle of Gettysburg

== Notable members ==
- Private Henry S. Finkenbiner, Company D - Medal of Honor recipient for action at the Battle of Dingle's Mill, April 9, 1865

== Monuments and Memorials ==
The regiment has a monument north of Gettysburg on Barlow's Knoll. Their service is also documented in the 2022 book A Thousand May Fall: An Immigrant Regiment's Civil War by Brian Matthew Jordan.

== See also ==
- List of Ohio Civil War units
- Ohio in the Civil War
