= Bentonville Battlefield =

Battlefield in North Carolina, United States

- U.S. National Register of Historic Places
- U.S. National Historic Landmark
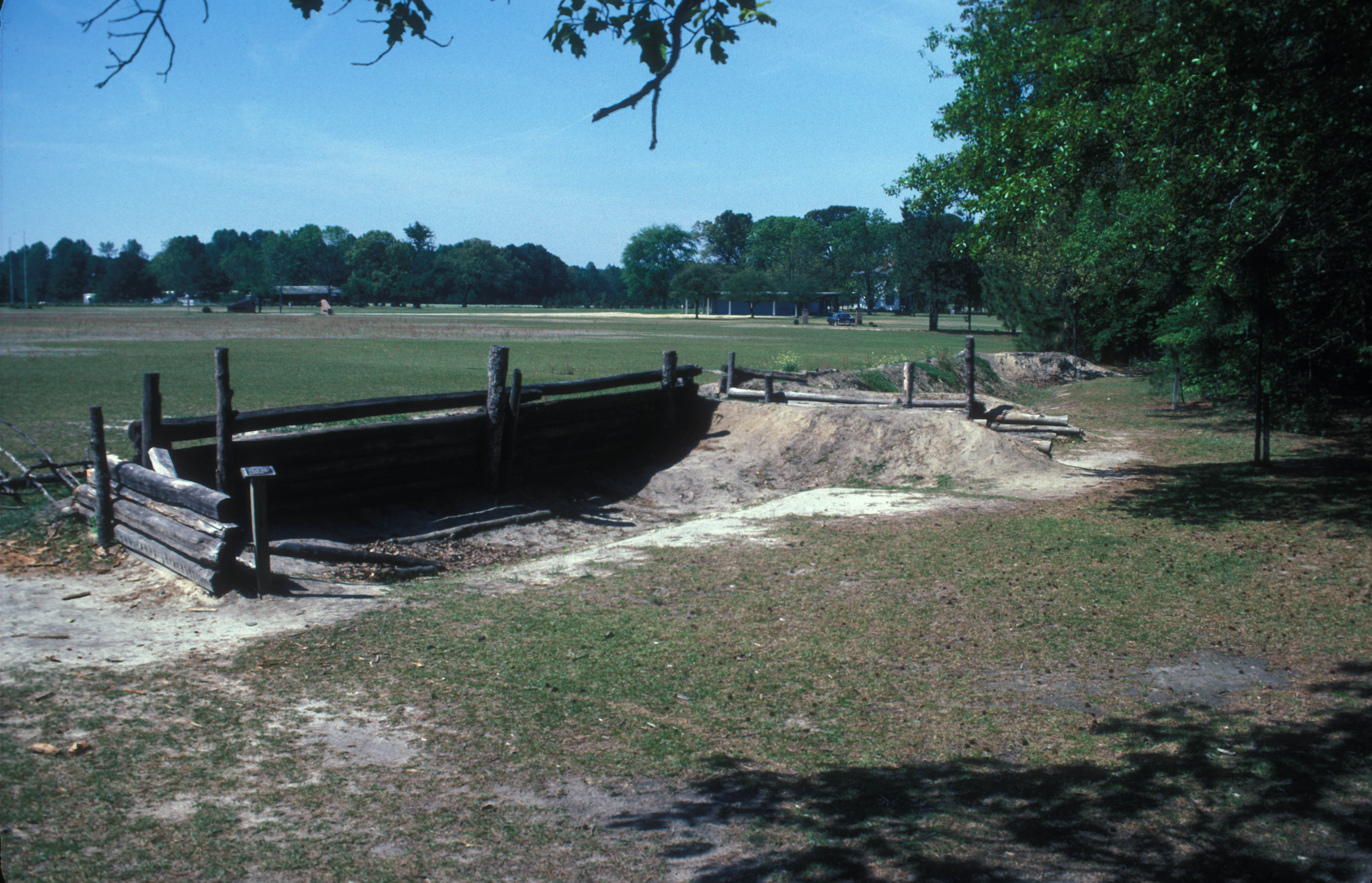
- Preserved earthworks at Bentonville Battlefield

- Location within North Carolina
- Location: Johnston County, North Carolina
- Coordinates: 35°18′23″N 78°19′26″W
- Area: 6,500 acres (10.2 sq mi; 26 km^{2}) (landmarked battlefield area); 130 acres (53 ha) (state historic site area)
- NRHP reference No.: 70000460

Significant dates
- Added to NRHP: February 26, 1970
- Designated NHL: June 19, 1996

Bentonville Battlefield, also known as the Bentonville Battlefield State Historic Site, is an American Civil War battlefield in Johnston County, North Carolina. It was the site of the 1865 battle of Bentonville, fought in the waning days of the Civil War. The site was declared a National Historic Landmark in 1996.

== Description and history ==
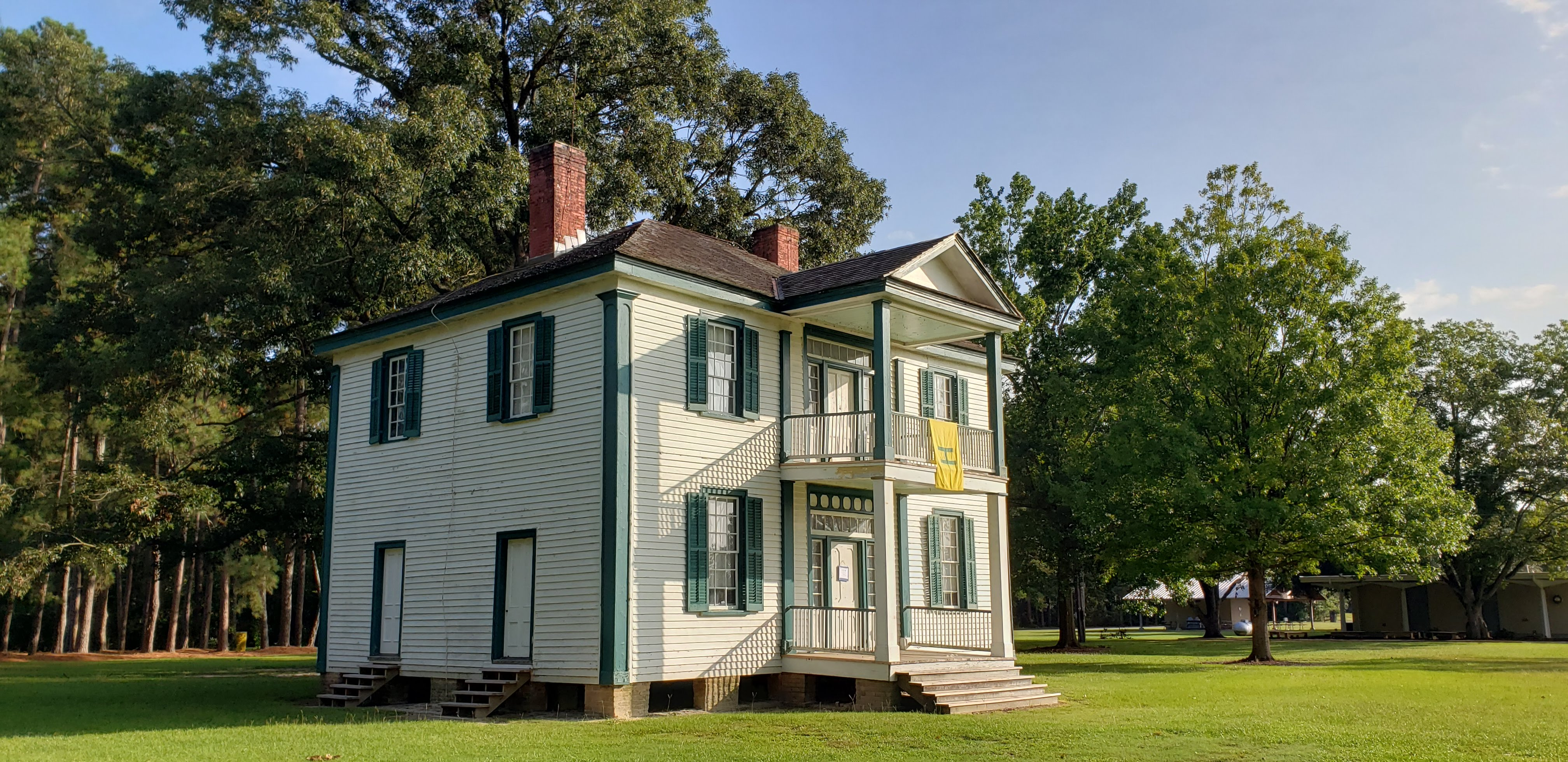
Main façade of the Harper House, used as the field hospital for the Union's Fourteenth Army Corps.

Bentonville Battlefield State Historic Site is one of more than 20 North Carolina State Historic Sites interpreting the history of the state of North Carolina. The site is located in southern Johnston County, near Newton Grove. The site has a visitors center that is located at the junction of Harper House Road and Mill Creek Church Road (County Roads 1008 and 1108, respectively), roughly at the southwestern corner of the area in which the battle took place, which extends most of the way to Bentonville, and is also the location of the Harper House, the only surviving building from the time of the battle. Evidence of earthworks erected by both Union and Confederate forces is visible in the area. The site also includes an extensive driving tour and walking trails that cover the battlefield.

The Battle of Bentonville was fought March 19–21, 1865, and was the largest Civil War battle fought in North Carolina. The Confederate defeat marked a serious weakening of one of its last surviving major armies, but was a significant enough engagement that it convinced Union General Ulysses S. Grant to leave General William T. Sherman in North Carolina, in order to further subdue the surviving forces led by General Joseph E. Johnston.

The American Battlefield Trust and its partners have acquired and preserved 2,063 acres (8.35 km^{2}) of the battlefield from 1990 to 2023. About 1/3 of original battlefield is owned by the state of North Carolina.

== Exhibits ==
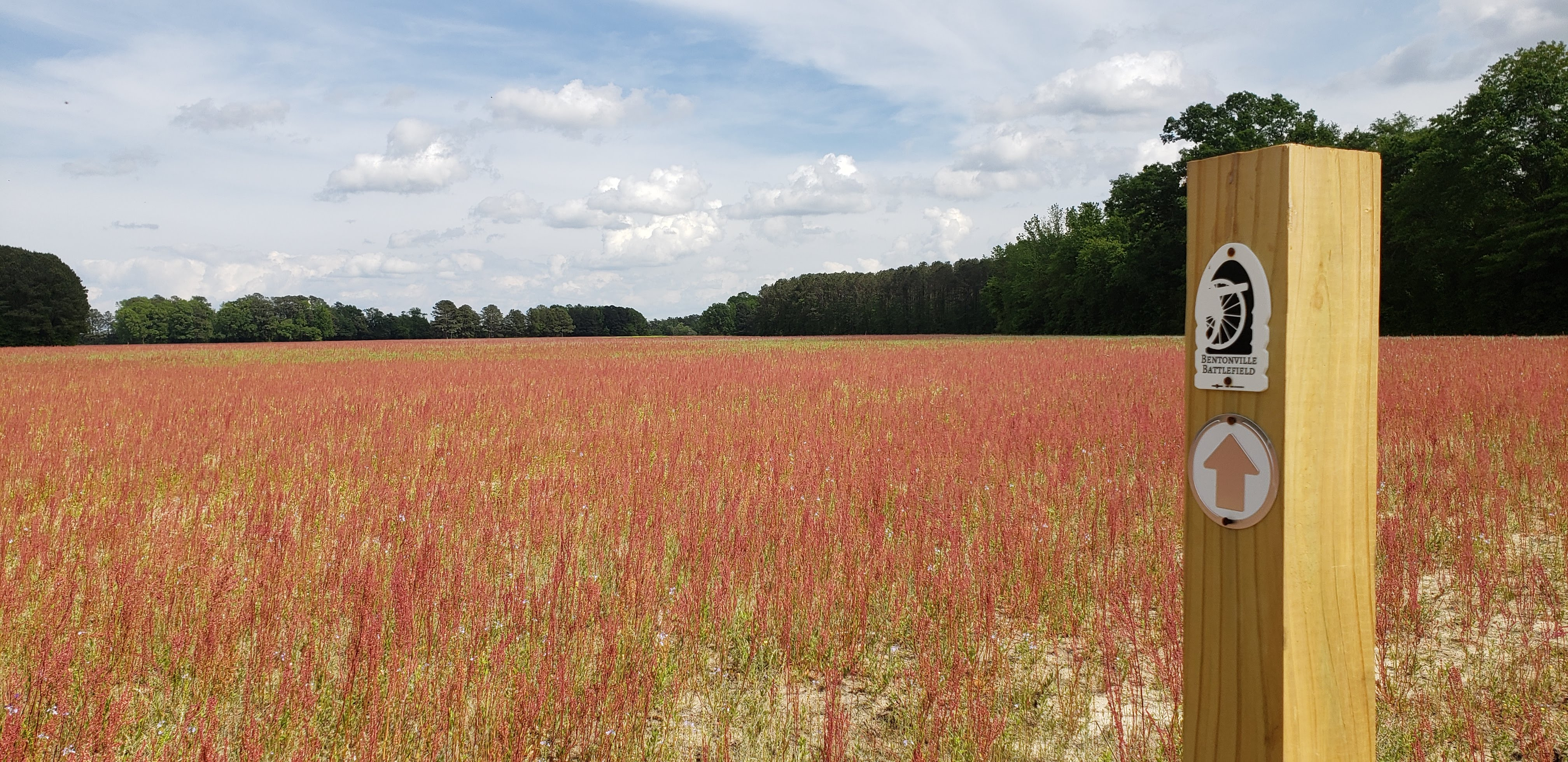
The Battlefield Walking Traill

Visitors to the battlefield can tour a restored Harper House, used as the field hospital for the Union's Fourteenth Army Corps, and includes a reconstructed kitchen and enslaved people's quarters. Exhibits at the park's visitor center focus on the battle, and include interactive maps, artifacts and displays about soldiers and commanders from both armies. There is also a 15-minute audiovisual program about the battle. Outdoor exhibits in the park include the Federal XX Corps reserve trenches, the Harper family cemetery, a Confederate cemetery, several monuments, and a 10-mile driving tour with 8 tour stops. The site also features nearly 5 miles of walking trails along original trenches built during the battle.

== See also ==
- List of National Historic Landmarks in North Carolina
- National Register of Historic Places listings in Johnston County, North Carolina
