= Brian Matthew Jordan =

American historian

Brian Matthew Jordan is an American historian who specializes in the American Civil War. He is a professor of history and chair of the Department of History at Sam Houston State University. His 2016 book Marching Home: Union Veterans and Their Unending Civil War details the psychological and physical traumas that haunted Union soldiers as they attempted to re-integrate into American society after the Civil War. The book was a finalist for the Pulitzer Prize for History. Marching Home was developed from Jordan's PhD thesis at Yale University, which won the George Washington Egleston Prize and John Addison Porter Prize. The book details how many Union soldiers faced the same health problems that beset veterans of all conflicts and eras, including alcoholism, suicide, post traumatic stress disorder, and amputated limbs. For returning Union veterans, this was made more difficult as they returned to a society who wanted to forget the struggles of the war and were not empathetic to the veterans' plight. Union veterans had to petition for better pensions and advocate for psychiatric hospitals and veterans homes (homes that provided long term housing for disabled veterans). To research the book, Jordan examined a variety of primary sources including soldiers' diaries, soldiers' essays and medical reports. Writing for The Wall Street Journal, Randall Fuller stated that the book's narrative is still relevant and urgent today as veterans from the Iraq War and War in Afghanistan face similar struggles. Fuller concluded: "Ultimately Mr. Jordan’s book may tell us almost as much about our own time as it does about the decades following the Civil War."

His 2022 book A Thousand May Fall: An Immigrant Regiment's Civil War details the 107th Ohio Infantry Regiment which fought valiantly during the Civil War, including at the battles of Chancellorsville and Gettysburg. The regiment's soldiers, who were mostly German immigrants, found themselves vilified by the Northern press.

Jordan has a PhD, M. Phil, and an MA in History from Yale University.
