= General Francis H. West House =

Historic house in Wisconsin, United States

- Gen. Francis H. West House
- U.S. National Register of Historic Places
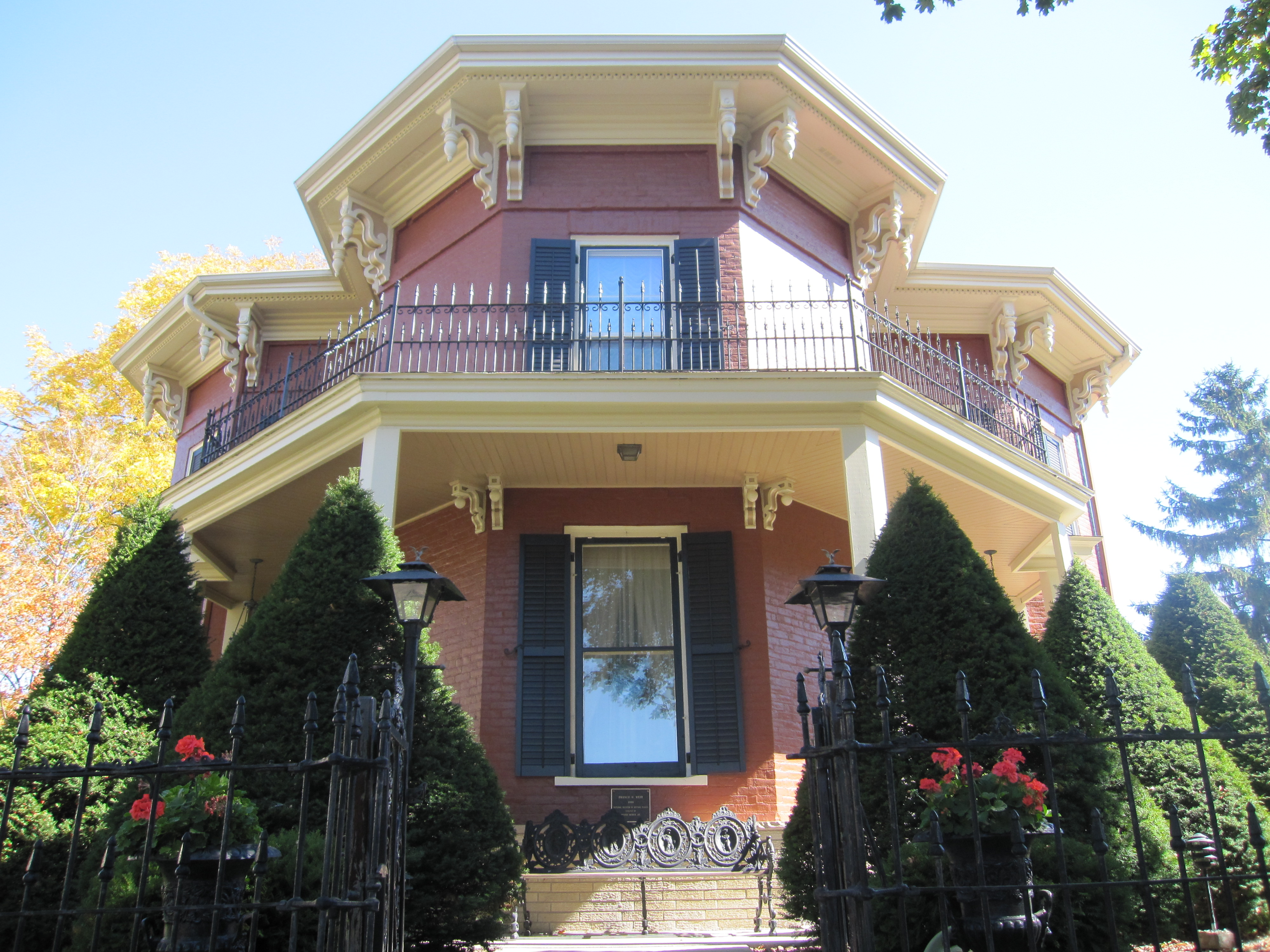

- Location within Wisconsin Location within the United States
- Interactive map showing the location of Gen Francis H. West House
- Location: 1410 17th Avenue Monroe, Wisconsin
- Coordinates: 42°35′53″N 89°38′15″W
- Built: 1860
- Architect: Francis G. West
- Architectural style: Octagon Mode
- NRHP reference No.: 75000066
- Added to NRHP: January 1, 1975

The General Francis H. West House is an octagon house built in 1860 in Monroe, Wisconsin. It was listed on the National Register of Historic Places in 1975 for its association with the historically significant West, and for its unusual combination of multiple polygons.

Francis H. West was a New Englander who came west to become an early settler of the Monroe area. He had a diverse career, including lead miner, lumberman, state senator, and California explorer. During the Civil War he commanded the 31st Wisconsin Volunteer Infantry Regiment. In the 1850s, West built a wooden octagon house on the same property as the current house, but it was torn down in the 1930s.

West built the current octagon house from 1860 to 1861, with walls of brick two stories high. Most octagon houses are a single octagon, but this one is four joined octagonal polygons, with a rectangular wing behind and a small octagonal cupola on top of them all. The styling outside is Italianate, with brackets and knob pendants under the eaves.

Inside, the first floor contains a foyer, a parlor, a study, and a dining room, with the rectangular wing containing a kitchen, a family room, and a solarium that was added in the 80's. Some of these rooms have parquet floors. The second floor holds two bedrooms, a library, and a bathroom, with a small bedroom and bathroom in the rectangular wing. From the start, West's house included a progressive-for-the-time gravity plumbing system with lead pipes embedded in the walls, fed by a tank in the attic that is still present, and an "air conditioning" system which let air funnel from the cupola above into the rooms below.

Orson Fowler of New York was the proponent of octagon houses, publishing a book on them in 1847. It's unclear how much Francis West was influenced by Fowler, but West's combination of polygons is unique in Wisconsin and not an idea from Fowler.
