= George Hyer =

American politician

George Hyer (July 16, 1819 – April 20, 1872) was a member of the Wisconsin State Senate and the Wisconsin State Assembly. Hyer was elected to the Senate in 1850 and to the Assembly in 1863.

== Biography ==
Hyer was born on July 16, 1819, in Fort Covington, New York. Hyer married Catherine Keyes. They had a son before her death in 1863. In 1867, Hyer married R. H. Fernandez. Hyer died on April 20, 1872, and was buried at Forest Hill Cemetery.
