= Edmund A. West =

19th century American politician

Member of the Wisconsin Senate from the 24th district
- In office January 6, 1862 – January 4, 1864
- Preceded by: John Wesley Stewart
- Succeeded by: Walter S. Wescott

Member of the Wisconsin State Assembly from the Green 2nd district
- In office January 3, 1859 – January 2, 1860
- Preceded by: William G. Brown
- Succeeded by: Martin Mitchell

Personal details
- Born: April 26, 1823 Elyria, Ohio, U.S.
- Died: April 30, 1922 (aged 99) Chicago, Illinois, U.S.
- Cause of death: Pneumonia
- Resting place: Oak Woods Cemetery, Chicago
- Party: Republican; Whig (before 1854)
- Spouses: Caroline P. Day (m. 1847; died 1873); Caroline Amelia DeClercq (m. 1878; died 1901)
- Children: Julia P. West; (b. 1848; died 1889)
- Relatives: E. B. West (fourth cousin); Francis H. West (fifth cousin)
- Education: Oberlin College
- Profession: Lawyer

Edmund Abbott West (April 26, 1823 – April 30, 1922) was an American lawyer, Republican politician, and Wisconsin pioneer. He served in the Wisconsin Senate (1862 & 1863) and State Assembly (1859), representing Green County.

== Biography ==
Edmund A. West was born in Elyria, Ohio, in April 1823. His father died when he was still a small child. He likely continued to live with his mother and her second husband, Norris Obed Stow, but may have lived some time with his aunt, Cornelia, and her husband and children. He attended Oberlin College and graduated in 1843. He went on to study law in Elyria, and was admitted to the bar at Columbus, Ohio, in 1845. He practiced law in Elyria until 1853.

While living in Elyria, he became involved in politics with the Whig Party. In December 1847, he purchased the Elyria Courier from John H. Faxon, and operated it as a Whig partisan paper for two years. During the 1848 presidential race, however, he refused to endorse the Whig candidate Zachary Taylor, and instead supported the Free Soil nominee, former president Martin Van Buren. Despite this break in 1848, West continued to operate within the Whig party and ran for prosecuting attorney in 1851 on the Whig ticket.

He came west to Wisconsin about 1853 and settled in Decatur, Wisconsin, in the eastern part of Green County. At the time of his death, he was referred to as one of the founders of the Republican Party. He likely attended the July 13, 1854, state convention in Madison, but not the earlier convention at Ripon, Wisconsin, which was the true origin of the party. West was quite active with the Republican Party in the 1850s, and worked as a "political assistant" to the publisher of the Monroe Sentinel for the 1860 presidential election.

He first held elected office in 1857, when he was elected the first director of the Brodhead school district.

He was then the Republican nominee for Wisconsin State Assembly in Green County's 2nd (Southern) district in 1858, and subsequently the Republican nominee for Wisconsin Senate in the 24th Senate district (all of Green County) in 1861. In these two elections for state office, West faced off against two of his distant cousins, Frederick Fitch West and his brother Francis Henry West. Frederick F. West was the Democratic nominee for Assembly in 1858, Francis H. West was the Union nominee for Senate in 1861. Edmund West prevailed in both elections, serving in the 1859, 1862, and 1863 legislative sessions.

He did not run for re-election to the Senate in 1863, and in 1865 he moved to Chicago, where he concentrated on his legal career for much of the rest of his life. He partnered with L. L. Bond in Chicago and gradually came to devote all of his energy to patent law. Their firm West & Bond became the leading patent law firm operating in the northwest.

His health began a gradual decline during his 98th year. He celebrated his 99th birthday on April 26, 1922, but almost immediately afterward developed a severe Pneumonia. He died at his home four days later on April 30, 1922.

== Personal life and family ==
Edmund A. West was the only known son of Edmund West and his wife Julia (née Johnson). His parents came from Connecticut and were among the earliest settlers of Elyria, Ohio. His father, Edmund West, opened the first store in Elyria in 1818 and later became the first county treasurer of Lorain County, Ohio, in 1824. His mother had been the first teacher at Carlisle, Ohio. Edmund A. West's paternal grandfather, Jeremiah West, was a medical doctor and served five years as a surgeon in the American Revolutionary War. The Wests were descended from Francis West, a carpenter who came to the Massachusetts Bay Colony from England in the 1630s. The previously mentioned Frederick and Francis West were also descendants of the colonist Francis West, but he was their last common ancestor with Edmund West—they were fifth cousins.

Edmund A. West married twice. He married Caroline P. Day in 1847. She was also a recent graduate of Oberlin College. They had at least one daughter before her death in 1873. West subsequently married Caroline Amelia DeClercq in 1878, and that marriage lasted until her death in 1901. Edmund West's only known child, Julia P. West, died in 1889.

== Electoral history ==
=== Wisconsin Assembly (1858) ===
Wisconsin Assembly, Green 2nd District Election, 1858
Party	Candidate	Votes	%	±%
General Election, November 2, 1858
Republican	Edmund A. West	824	62.42%	+8.31%
Democratic	Frederick F. West	496	37.58%	
Plurality		328	24.85%	+16.61%
Total votes		1,320	100.0%	+8.73%
Republican hold				

=== Wisconsin Senate (1861) ===
Wisconsin Senate, 24th District Election, 1861
Party	Candidate	Votes	%	±%
General Election, November 5, 1861
Republican	Edmund A. West	1,228	57.68%	−0.48%
National Union	Francis H. West	901	42.32%	
Plurality		327	15.36%	-0.95%
Total votes		2,129	100.0%	-24.18%
Republican hold				

Wisconsin State Assembly
Preceded by William G. Brown	Member of the Wisconsin State Assembly from the Green 2nd district January 3, 1859 – January 2, 1860	Succeeded by Martin Mitchell
Wisconsin Senate
Preceded by John Wesley Stewart	Member of the Wisconsin Senate from the 24th district January 6, 1862 – January 4, 1864	Succeeded by Walter S. Wescott
