= Battle of Bentonville =

1865 battle of the American Civil War

- Part of the American Civil War
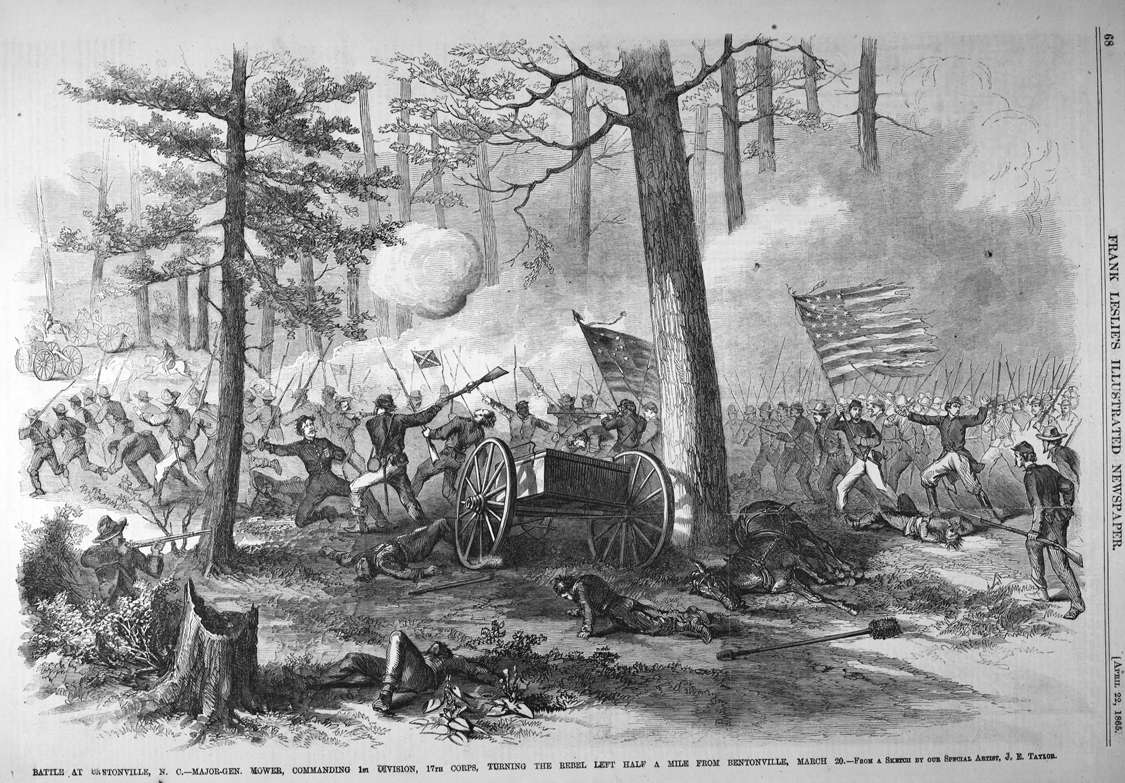
- Frank Leslie's Illustrated Newspaper April 22, 1865 issue, showing union troops routing the rebel left flank
Date	March 19–21, 1865
Location	Bentonville, North Carolina 35°18′23″N 78°19′26″W
Result	Union victory

Belligerents
United States (Union)	Confederate States

Commanders and leaders
(United States) William T. Sherman	(Confederate States of America) Joseph E. Johnston (Confederate States of America) Braxton Bragg

Units involved
Military Division of the Mississippi	Army of the South

Strength
60,000	21,900

Casualties and losses
1,527 total (194 killed, 1,112 wounded, 221 missing/captured)	2,606 total (239 killed, 1,694 wounded, 673 missing/captured)
- Location within North Carolina

The Battle of Bentonville (March 19–21, 1865) was fought in Johnston County, North Carolina, near the village of Bentonville, as part of the Western Theater of the American Civil War. It was the last battle between the western field armies of William T. Sherman and Joseph E. Johnston.

As the right wing of Sherman's army under command of Maj. Gen. Oliver O. Howard marched toward Goldsborough, the left wing under command of Maj. Gen. Henry W. Slocum encountered the entrenched men of Johnston's army. On the first day of the battle, the Confederates attacked the 14th Army Corps and routed two divisions, but the rest of Sherman's army defended its positions successfully. The next day, as Sherman sent reinforcements to the battlefield and expected Johnston to withdraw, only minor sporadic fighting occurred. On the third day, as skirmishing continued, the division of Maj. Gen. Joseph A. Mower followed a path into the Confederate rear and attacked. The Confederates were able to repulse the attack as Sherman ordered Mower back to connect with his own corps. Johnston elected to withdraw from the battlefield that night.

As a result of the overwhelming Union strength and the heavy casualties his army suffered in the battle, Johnston surrendered to Sherman little more than a month later at Bennett Place, near Durham Station. Coupled with Gen. Robert E. Lee's surrender on April 9, Johnston's surrender represented the effective end of the war.

== Background ==
Following his March to the Sea, Major General William T. Sherman, commanding the Military Division of the Mississippi, moved his army northward through the Carolinas. The Union general in chief, Lieutenant General Ulysses S. Grant had ordered Sherman to bring his troops north to Virginia in order to battle the Army of Northern Virginia. However, Sherman argued that it would take too long to transport his troops there, and that his army could destroy Confederate supply lines to Petersburg and defeat Confederate forces by marching through the Carolinas. During the late winter and early spring of 1865, Sherman's army cut a swath of destruction through South Carolina. On March 8, Union soldiers crossed into North Carolina as Confederate units attempted to concentrate their forces to defeat the enemy during the march. Sherman divided his command into two parts, a Left Wing (the Army of Georgia) commanded by Maj. Gen. Henry Warner Slocum and a Right Wing (the Army of the Tennessee) commanded by Maj. Gen. Oliver Otis Howard. The two wings marched separately toward Goldsboro beginning on March 13, with no one in the Union command expecting major resistance from Johnston.

On February 23, Confederate general-in-chief Robert E. Lee ordered Johnston to take command of the Army of Tennessee and other Confederate units in the Carolinas, Georgia, and Florida, and to "concentrate all available forces and drive back Sherman." Johnston managed to concentrate in North Carolina the Army of Tennessee commanded by Lt. Gen. Alexander P. Stewart, Maj. Gen. Robert Hoke's division from the Army of Northern Virginia, troops from the Department of South Carolina, Georgia, and Florida commanded by Lt. Gen. William J. Hardee, and cavalry under the command of Lt. Gen. Wade Hampton, calling the united force the Army of the South. Confederate maps erroneously showed that the two Union wings were twelve miles (19 km) apart, which meant each would take a day to reach the other. Johnston planned to concentrate his entire army to defeat Slocum's wing and to destroy its trains before it reunited with the rest of the Union column. The attack was planned for "as soon after dawn tomorrow [March 19] as possible".

== Opposing forces ==
Opposing commanders at Bentonville
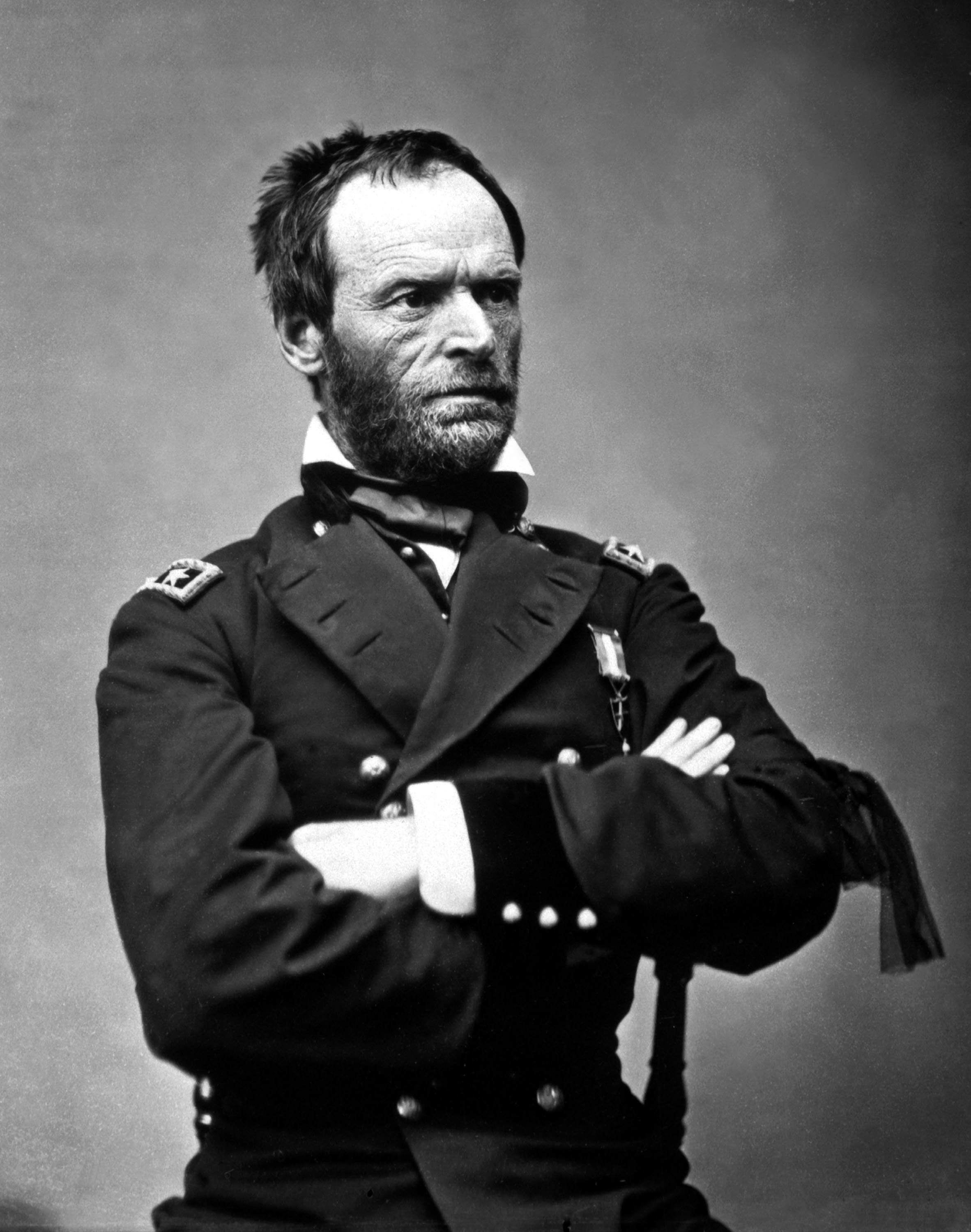
Maj. Gen.
William T. Sherman, United States Army

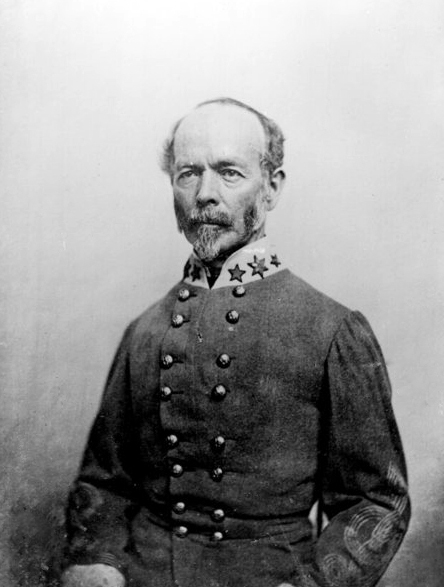
Gen.
Joseph E. Johnston, Confederate States Army

== Battle ==
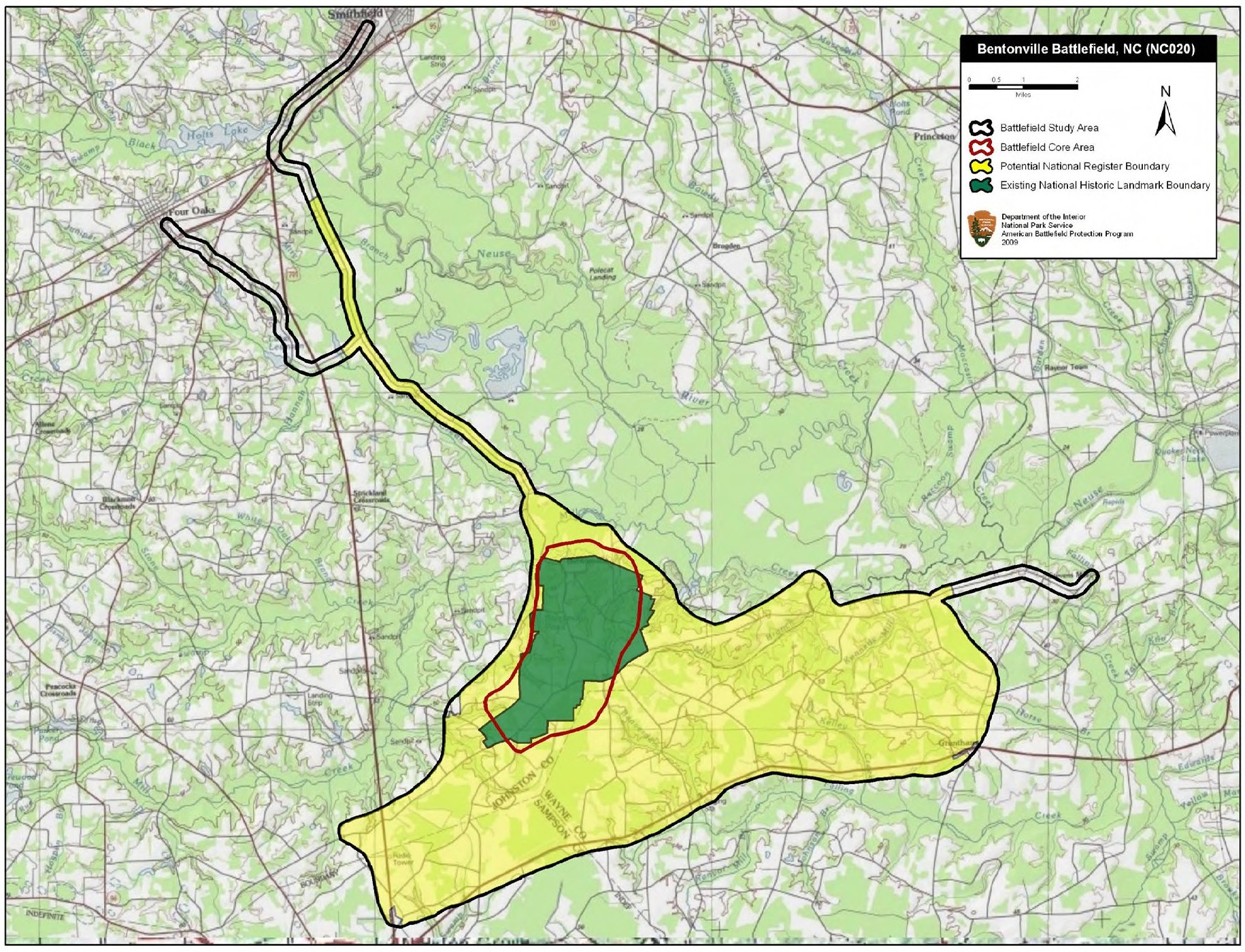
Map of Bentonville Battlefield core and study areas by the American Battlefield Protection Program

The Confederate attack commenced on March 19, as Slocum's men marched on the Goldsboro Road, one-mile (1.6 km) south of Bentonville. Hoke's division under Bragg's command deployed on the Confederate left facing west, while Stewart's army deployed on the Confederate right facing south. Slocum was convinced he faced only enemy cavalry and artillery, not an entire army. In addition, Sherman did not believe that Johnston would fight with the Neuse River to his rear. Therefore, Slocum initially notified Sherman that he was facing only cursory resistance near Bentonville and did not require aid.

Believing he faced only cavalry, Slocum attempted to brush aside the Confederates by attacking with the 1st Division of Brig. Gen. William P. Carlin from the 14th Army Corps, but this attack was driven back. Slocum then deployed his divisions in a defensive line, with Carlin's division on the left, Brig. Gen. James D. Morgan's 2nd Division on the right and two 20th Army Corps divisions in support, in order to delay the Confederates long enough to allow the rest of his wing to arrive. None of the divisions, except for Morgan's, constructed strong breastworks, which were further compromised by a gap in the center of the Union line. Lafayette McLaws' division from Hardee's command was approaching the Confederate positions at the time of the Union attacks. Due to Bragg's concern about a flanking attack on Hoke's left, McLaws was ordered to deploy on the Confederate left flank. About noon, Hardee arrived with the division of William B. Taliaferro, which was deployed behind the Army of Tennessee. Hardee was then placed in charge of the Confederate right wing.

It looked like a picture and at our distance was truly beautiful ... But it was a painful sight to see how close their battle flags were together, regiments being scarcely larger than companies and a division not much larger than a regiment should be.

— Col. Charles W. Broadfoot, 1st North Carolina Junior Reserves, describing the attack by the Army of Tennessee

At 3 pm, Confederate infantry from the Army of Tennessee launched an attack and drove the Union left flank back in confusion, nearly capturing Carlin in the process and overrunning the 14th Army Corps field hospital. Confederates under Maj. Gen. D.H. Hill filled the vacuum left by the retreating Federals and began enfilading the Union troops remaining along the front. Morgan's division was nearly surrounded and was being attacked from three sides, but the Confederate attacks were uncoordinated and therefore unsuccessful in driving them from the position. Hardee, using Taliaferro's division and Bate's corps from the Army of Tennessee, attacked the Union positions near the Harper house but were repulsed after multiple assaults. McLaws arrived after Taliaferro and Bate were repulsed. He attacked, but was repulsed as well. After a heated engagement, Union reinforcements arrived and checked Hill's assault. Fighting continued after nightfall as the Confederates tried without success to drive back the Union line. About midnight, the Confederates withdrew to their original positions and started entrenching.

Slocum had called for aid from Sherman during the afternoon attacks, and Howard's wing arrived on the field late on the afternoon of March 20, deploying on Slocum's right flank and extending the Union line towards Mill Creek. Johnston responded to Howard's arrival by pulling back Hoke's division so it ran at a right angle to Stewart's left flank, and deployed one of Hardee's divisions on Hoke's left. Confederate cavalry protected the Confederate flank to Mill Creek in a weak skirmish line. Only light skirmishing occurred on this day. Johnston remained on the field, claiming that he stayed to remove his wounded, but perhaps also in hope of enticing Sherman to attack again, as had happened at Kennesaw Mountain.

On March 21, Union Maj. Gen. Joseph A. Mower, commanding the division on the Union right flank, requested permission from his corps commander to launch a "little reconnaissance" to his front, which was granted. Mower instead launched an attack with two brigades on the Confederate left flank, which was defending Mill Creek Bridge. Mower's men managed to come within one-mile (1.6 km) of the crossing before Sherman peremptorily ordered them to pull back. In his memoirs, Sherman admitted that this was a mistake and that he missed an opportunity to end the campaign then and there, perhaps capturing Johnston's army entirely. Among the Confederate casualties was Hardee's 16-year-old son, Willie. Hardee had reluctantly allowed his son to attach himself to the 8th Texas Cavalry just hours before Mower's attack.

== Aftermath ==
During the battle, the Confederates suffered a total of nearly 2,600 casualties: 239 killed, 1,694 wounded and 673 missing. About half of the casualties were lost in the Army of Tennessee. The Union army lost 194 killed, 1,112 wounded, and 221 missing, for a total of 1,527 casualties. The wounded were treated at the house of John Harper, with 360 unknown Confederates buried in a mass grave next to the Harper family cemetery.

I can do no more than annoy him. I respectfully suggest that it is no longer a question whether you leave present position; you have only to decide where to meet Sherman. I will be near him.

— Joseph Johnston to Robert E. Lee

During the night of March 21 until the following dawn, Johnston withdrew his army across Mill Creek and burned the bridge behind him, leaving behind a cavalry detachment as a rearguard. The Union army failed to detect the Confederate retreat until it was over. Sherman did not pursue the Confederates, but continued his march to Goldsboro, where he joined the Union forces under Terry and Schofield. After resting and refitting his combined forces, Sherman planned to continue onward to Petersburg, Virginia. However, following Lee's surrender at Appomattox Court House, Johnston surrendered to Sherman at the Bennett Place, North Carolina on April 26.

After the Confederate Army defeat at the Battle of Bentonville the army re-assembled around the grounds of the Everitt P. Stevens House where the last Grand Review of the army was held on April 6, 1865. In attendance at the review were Generals William J. Hardee, Joseph E. Johnston and Governor Zebulon Baird Vance.

== Battlefield preservation ==
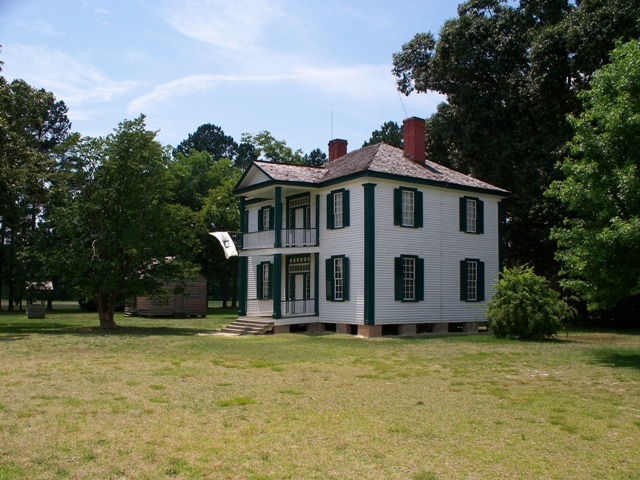
The Harper House, built in the 1850s, served as a Union field hospital during the battle and is located adjacent to the Bentonville Battlefield museum, which offers tours of its interior.

The site of the battle is preserved as the Bentonville Battleground State Historic Site, which was declared a National Historic Landmark in 1996. The park, founded in 1965, includes 130 acres (0.53 km^{2}) of the battlefield and runs a visitor center adjacent to the restored Harper House, which served as a hospital for Union soldiers during the battle. The Bentonville Battlefield Historical Association and the American Battlefield Trust also own portions of the battlefield not included in the state park, including 1,924 acres (7.79 km^{2}) by the Trust alone. The Trust and its partners, including the historical association, have acquired and preserved more than 2,063 acres (8.35 km^{2}) of the battlefield in more than 55 separate acquisitions since 1990.

== Additional images ==
American Civil War: Battle of Bentonville, North Carolina, 1865
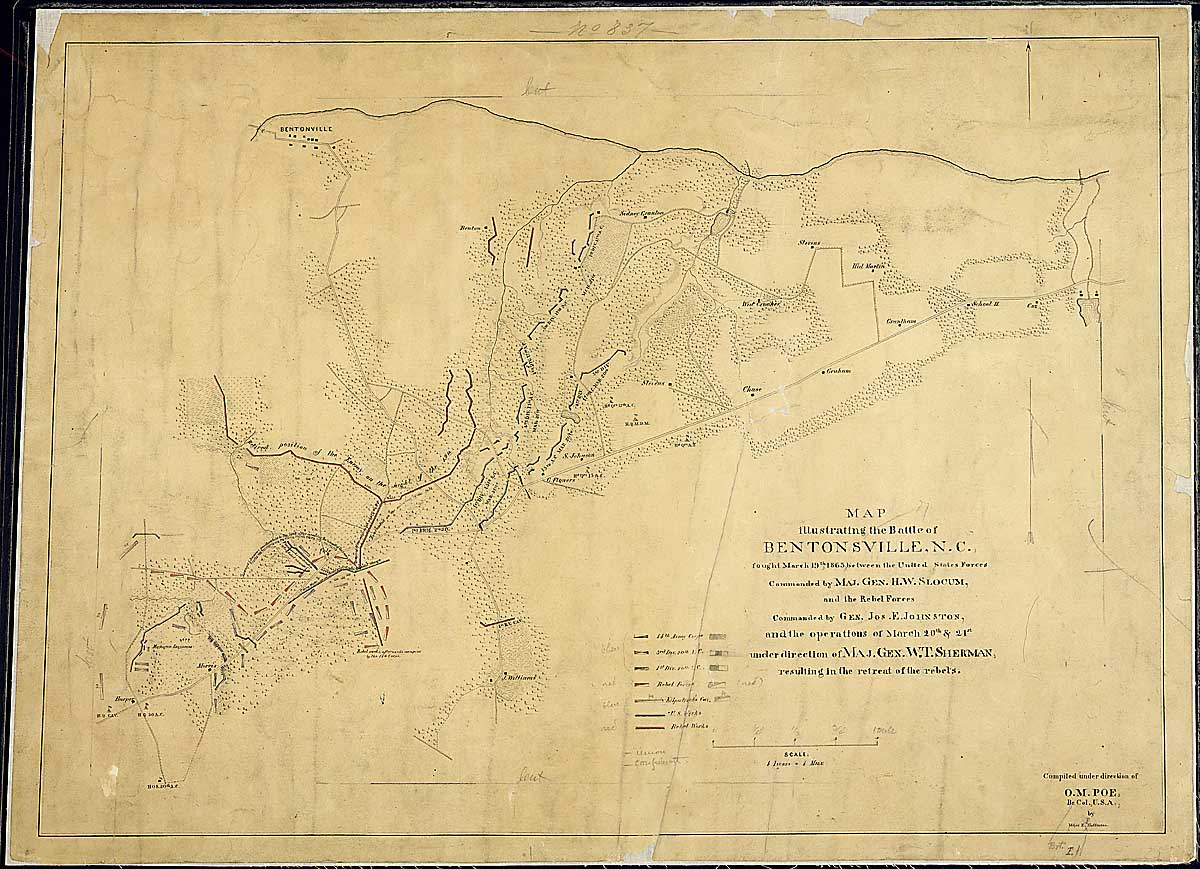
Map illustrating the Battle of Bentonsville, N.C., fought March 19th, 1865, between the United States Forces Commanded by Maj. Gen. H. W. Slocum and the Rebel Forces Commanded by Gen. Jos. E. Johnston, and the operations of March 20th & 21st under direction of Maj. Gen. W. T. Sherman resulting in the retreat of the rebels. Compiled under direction of O. M. Poe, Br. [Bvt.] Col., U.S.A., by Major E. [F.] Hoffmann. (NAID 305615)

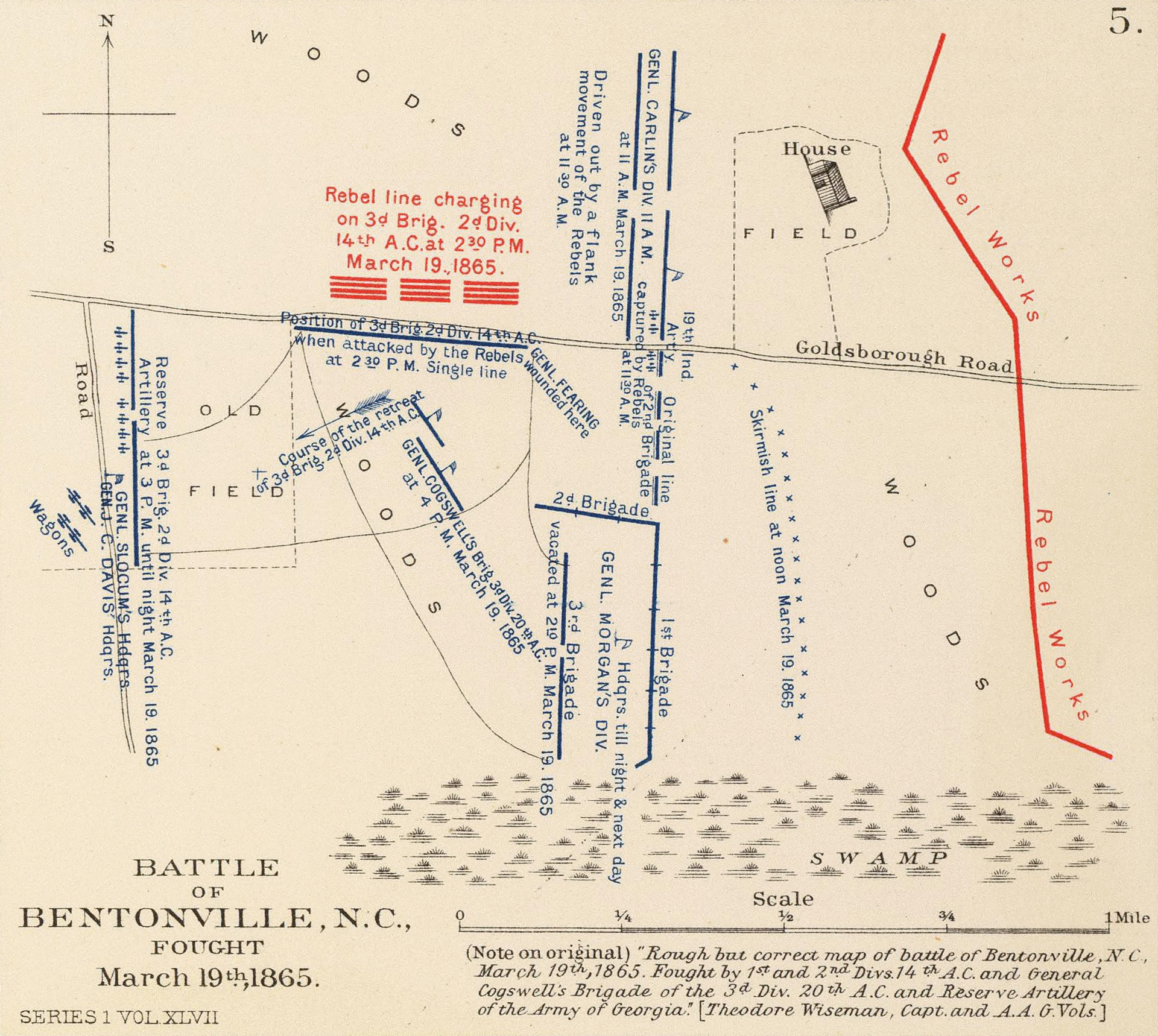
Simplified map of the battle

== See also ==
- Commemoration of the American Civil War
- Commemoration of the American Civil War on postage stamps
- Carolinas campaign
- List of costliest American Civil War land battles
- Troop engagements of the American Civil War, 1865
