= Battle of Dingle's Mill =

Battle of the American Civil War

Coordinates: 33°52′33″N 80°20′9″W

- Part of the American Civil War
Date	April 9, 1865
Location	Sumter, South Carolina
Result	Union victory

Belligerents
United States (Union)	Confederate States

Commanders and leaders
Edward E. Potter	Pierce M. B. Young

Units involved
brigades	20th SC Militia Regt & local volunteers

Strength
2700	158

Casualties and losses
4 killed 20 wounded	6 killed 7 wounded 2 captured
- Location within South Carolina

The Battle of Dingle's Mill was an American Civil War battle that took place near Sumter, South Carolina.

== Background ==
Major General Quincy A. Gillmore ordered a provisional division assembled under the command of Brigadier General Edward E. Potter. Potter was ordered to destroy the railroads in the area between Florence, Sumter, and Camden. The importance of the mission was pointedly made by Sherman's statement that "Those cars and locomotives should be destroyed if to do it costs you 500 men." Potter took command of the provisional division on April 1, 1865, at Georgetown. The division numbered 2,700 men composed of two infantry brigades and auxiliary troops.

The First Brigade commanded by Col. Philip P. Brown commander of the 157th N.Y consisted of:

- 157th New York Volunteer Infantry Regiment augmented by a detachment of the 56th N.Y. Veteran Volunteer Infantry
- 25th Ohio Veteran Volunteer Infantry
- 107th Ohio Volunteer Infantry

The Second Brigade, commanded by Col. Edward Needles Hallowell, commander of the 54th Massachusetts consisted of:

- 54th Massachusetts Volunteer Infantry
- 32nd Regiment United States Colored Troops
- 102nd Regiment United States Colored Troops

In addition small detachments of the 1st New York Engineers, 4th Massachusetts Cavalry and two guns of Battery B 3rd New York Artillery accompanied the two infantry brigades.

== Battle ==
On Easter Day, April 9, 1865, the Battle of Dingle's Mill was fought 3 miles (4.8 km) south of Sumter. At approximately three in the morning, General Edward E. Potter's army, called Potter's Raiders, came from the direction of Kingstree. They were joined by Col. Edward Needles Hallowell's troops, who had crossed the Pocotaligo River, throwing Colonel Presley's men across Turkey Creek. This put them north of the pond at Dingle's Mill.

Confederate militiamen, under the command of Col. James Fowler Pressley, dug in their heels behind meager breastworks and awaited the arrival of the Union forces. The two working pieces of artillery were commanded by Lt. William Alexander McQueen and a patient of Sumter hospital, Lt Pamerya, an artilleryman from New Orleans. A third piece of artillery was too rusted to work.

General Potter ordered Col. Hallowell to attack from the left and rear. The 54th was a part of this flanking column. Unable to reach the Rebels' position, the United States Colored Troops countermarched to where Colonel Brown's First Brigade was stationed on the main road. A Confederate volunteer remembered hearing "the church bells in town ringing for afternoon service" as the battle got underway. Hallowell's brigade reached their comrades a little after two in the afternoon.

Lt. McQueen was struck in the shoulder, incapacitating him, while Lt. Pamerya was killed by a minie ball in the forehead. The Confederate forces fell back toward Sumterville in the face of overwhelming odds. They made one more stand, but left the field of battle about six in the evening, ending the battle.

== Aftermath ==
At about this same time, General Robert E. Lee was meeting with General Ulysses S. Grant at Appomattox Courthouse, 300 miles (480 km) away. The Confederate force disbanded and returned to their homes after fighting the battle.

- Southern losses were six killed, seven wounded, two captured.
- Northern losses were four killed, twenty-three wounded.

One witness, W. H. Garland of Fernandina, Florida, claimed at least fifteen additional Northern forces were dead where they had crossed the swamp, and were buried in shallow graves which were dug up and robbed by camp followers of General Potter. After the battle, the camp followers also hanged Mr. Bee, an elderly Charleston gentleman who had fled to Sumter County from Charleston during the war. His home was located near what is now called Bee Street, probably east of Manning Avenue.
