= Prairie Spring Hotel =

- U.S. National Register of Historic Places
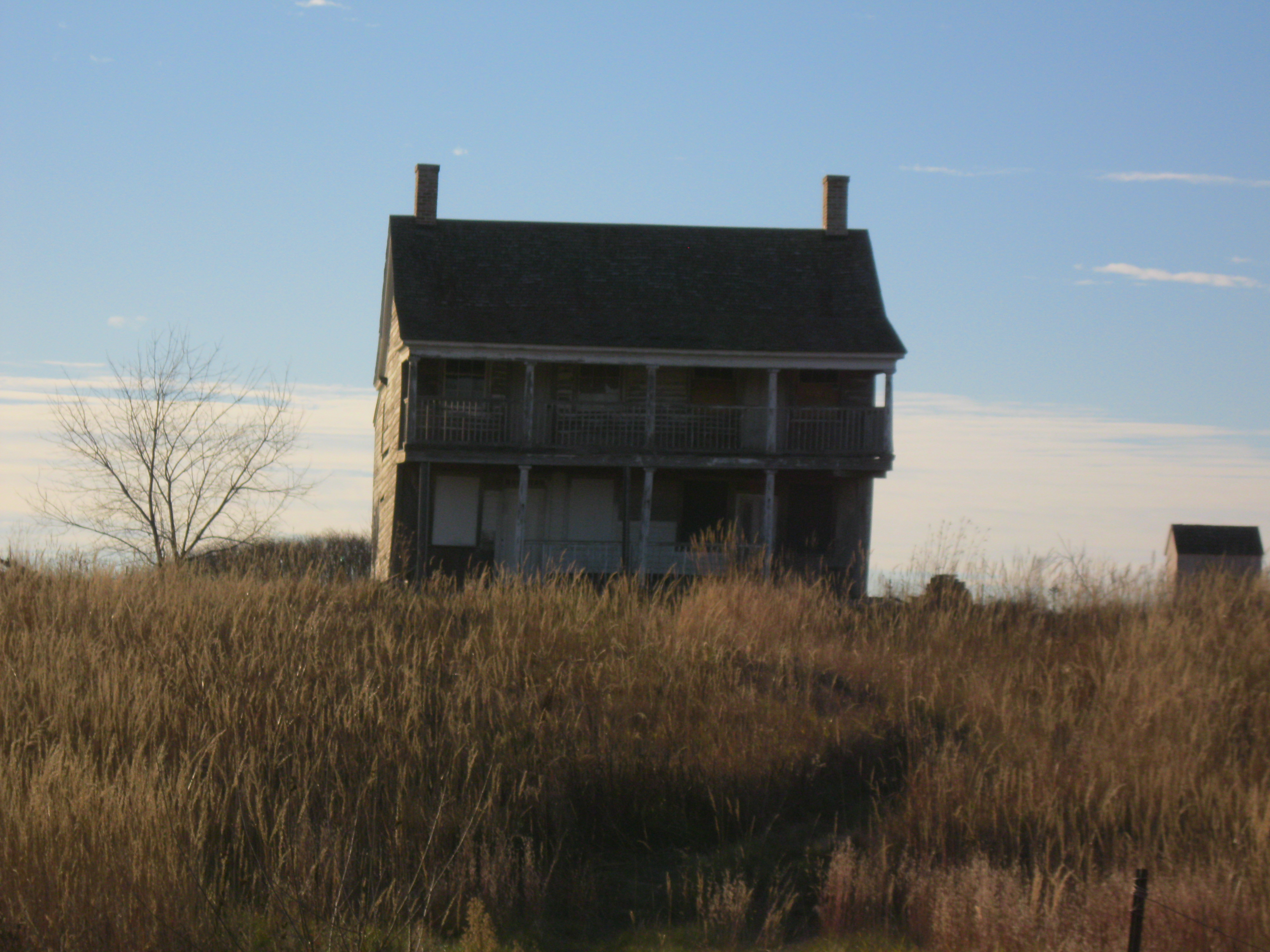

- Location within Wisconsin Location within the United States
- Location: WI 23 South, Willow Springs, Wisconsin
- Coordinates: 42°48′2″N 90°7′56″W
- Area: 3 acres (1.2 ha)
- Built: 1834
- Architectural style: Greek Revival
- NRHP reference No.: 99001273
- Added to NRHP: October 21, 1999

The Prairie Spring Hotel, also known as the Daniel Morgan Parkinson House, was built in 1834 with Greek Revival elements. The structure is located in Lafayette County outside Willow Springs, Wisconsin It was listed on the National Register of Historic Places in 1999.

In 1827 Daniel Morgan Parkinson left his home in Tennessee and brought his family to Galena. He and his sons tried lead-mining but didn't like it. The family ran an inn in Mineral Point, with his wife Rebecca "...a most excellent and popular landlady...." When the Black Hawk War broke out, Daniel and his son Peter served under Henry Dodge, including in the decisive Battle of Wisconsin Heights.

During the war, the Parkinsons spent some time in the stockade of Fort Defiance, five miles southeast of Mineral Point. In 1832 Daniel bought 80 acres of land a half mile from the fort, on the Military Road from Mineral Point to Galena. In 1833 he began building his hotel and home there on the hilltop.

This was very early, before Wisconsin was a state. This area was still part of Michigan Territory. Most structures built in the lead-mining region at the time were simple and functional. Parkinson instead built a two-story I-house - a style he knew from Tennessee - with walls of hand-hewn oak joined by mortise and tenon. It was clad in white oak clapboard, with a two-story front porch. The house was originally heated by limestone fireplaces. Inside, walls are lath and plaster, and mantels from the fireplaces remain.

Daniel Parkinson continued his public service after the war. He was elected a delegate to the territorial legislature in 1836 and again in 1840. In 1837 he was involved in incorporating the village of Mineral Point. In 1846 he represented Lafayette County at the first Constitutional Convention. In 1849 he served in the state of Wisconsin's second House of Representatives. He was one of the faction that was against banks and paper money, because of bad experiences during the territorial period. In the 1850s he served on the Lafayette county board, representing Willow Springs.

Before the hotel was complete, the road from Mineral Point to Galena shifted west, and in the 1840s it shifted further, so the hotel business faded, but the Parkinson family lived in the house and farmed. Parkinsons lived in the house until 1928. It was eventually abandoned and near demolition when in 1994 Dean Connors and the Lead Region Historic Trust moved it 800 feet to the north and stabilized it.

== See also ==
- List of the oldest buildings in Wisconsin
