= Fayette, Wisconsin =

- Town
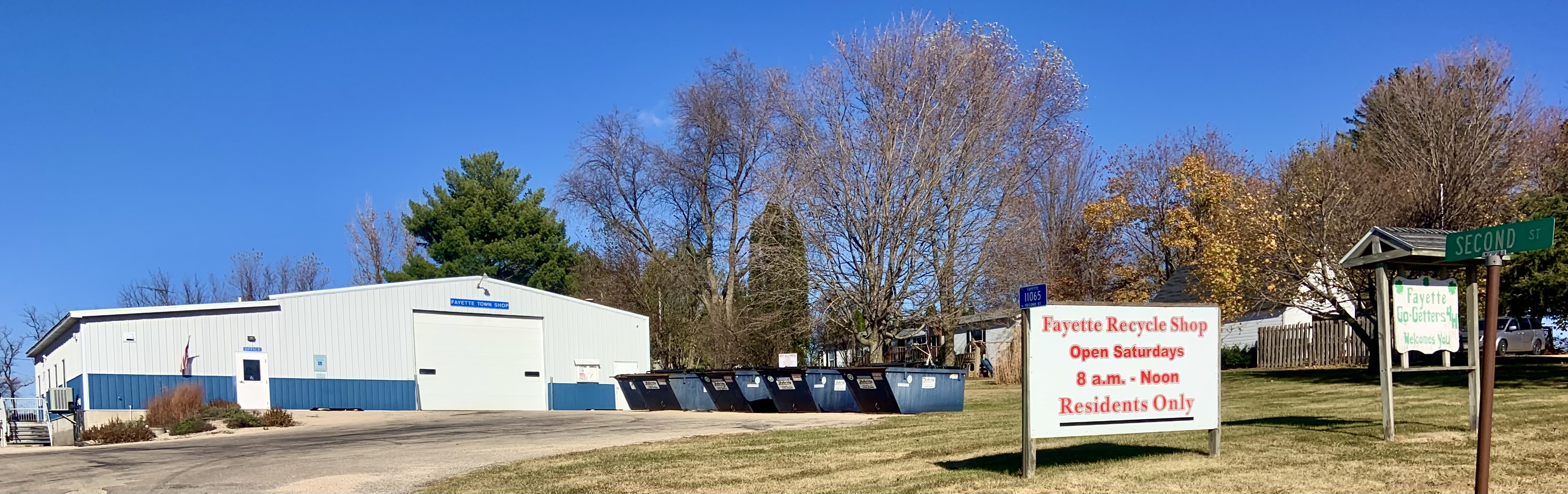
- Town hall

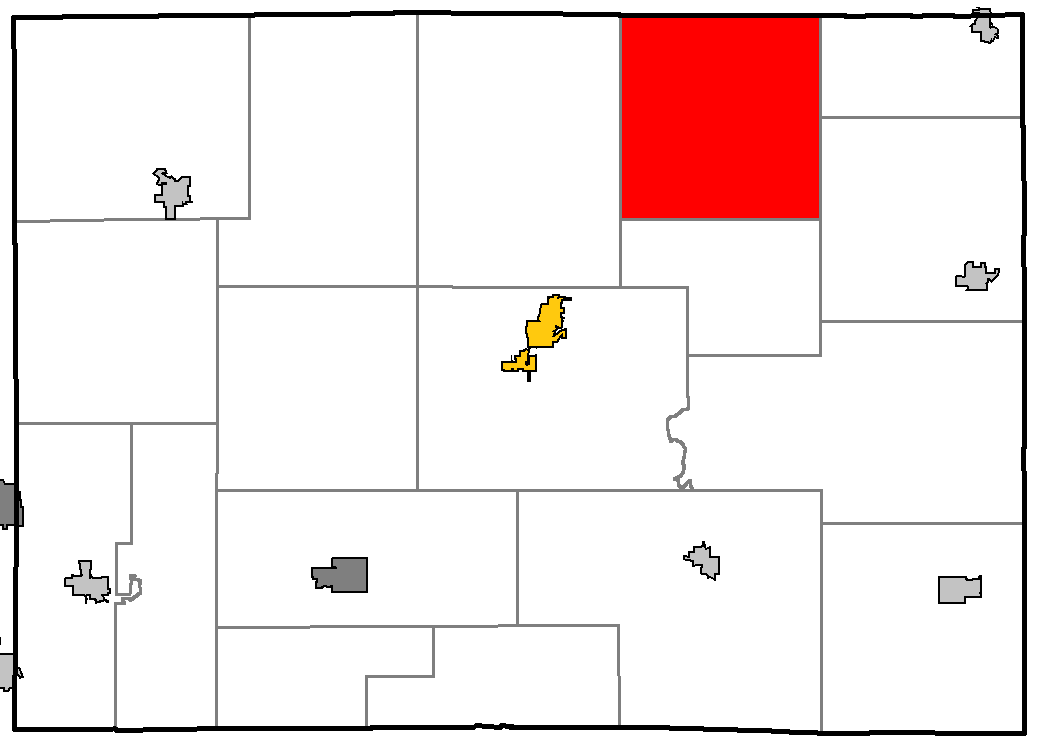
- Location of Fayette, within Lafayette County, Wisconsin

- Location of Lafayette County, Wisconsin
- Coordinates: 42°46′37″N 89°59′47″W
- Country: United States
- State: Wisconsin
- County: Lafayette

Area
  - Total: 35.88 sq mi (92.93 km^{2})
  - Land: 35.16 sq mi (91.06 km^{2})
  - Water: 0.72 sq mi (1.87 km^{2})
- Elevation: 1,076 ft (328 m)

Population (2020)
  - Total: 381
  - Density: 10.8/sq mi (4.18/km^{2})
- Time zone: UTC-6 (Central (CST))
  - Summer (DST): UTC-5 (CDT)
- ZIP Codes: 53530 (Darlington); 53504 (Argyle); 53516 (Blanchardville); 53565 (Mineral Point)
- Area code: 608
- FIPS code: 55-25475
- GNIS feature ID: 1583195

Fayette is a town in Lafayette County, Wisconsin, United States. The population was 381 at the 2020 census, up from 376 at the 2010 census. The unincorporated communities of Fayette and Yellowstone are located in the town.

== Geography ==
Fayette is in northeastern Lafayette County and is bordered to the north by Iowa County. According to the United States Census Bureau, the town has a total area of 35.9 square miles (92.9 km^{2}), of which 35.2 square miles (91.1 km^{2}) are land and 0.73 square miles (1.9 km^{2}), or 2.02%, are water. Yellowstone Lake is a reservoir on the Yellowstone River in the eastern part of the town.

== Demographics ==
Historical population
Census	Pop.	Note	%±
2000	366		—
2010	376		2.7%
2020	381		1.3%

As of the census of 2000, there were 366 people, 138 households, and 100 families residing in the town. The population density was 10.4 people per square mile (4.0/km^{2}). There were 155 housing units at an average density of 4.4 per square mile (1.7/km^{2}). The racial makeup of the town was 100.00% White.

There were 138 households, out of which 37.0% had children under the age of 18 living with them, 63.8% were married couples living together, 2.9% had a female householder with no husband present, and 27.5% were non-families. 21.7% of all households were made up of individuals, and 8.0% had someone living alone who was 65 years of age or older. The average household size was 2.65 and the average family size was 3.18.

In the town, the population was spread out, with 28.1% under the age of 18, 7.9% from 18 to 24, 28.4% from 25 to 44, 21.9% from 45 to 64, and 13.7% who were 65 years of age or older. The median age was 36 years. For every 100 females, there were 114.0 males. For every 100 females age 18 and over, there were 119.2 males.

The median income for a household in the town was $36,250, and the median income for a family was $40,625. Males had a median income of $23,750 versus $21,806 for females. The per capita income for the town was $16,566. About 5.7% of families and 9.7% of the population were below the poverty line, including 15.6% of those under age 18 and 3.4% of those age 65 or over.

== Notable people ==
- Robert McKee Bashford, jurist and politician
- Therese A. Jenkins, activist
- Eugene D. Parkinson, farmer and politician
- Buck Zumhofe, professional wrestler

== Recreation ==
- Yellowstone Lake State Park is on the north side of Yellowstone Lake and offers camping, picnicking, and a swimming beach. The south side of the lake is part of the Yellowstone State Wildlife Area.
