= Daniel Morgan Parkinson =

American politician

- Born: October 20, 1790; Carter County, Tennessee, U.S.
- Died: October 1, 1868 (aged 77); Willow Springs, Wisconsin, U.S.
- Occupations: Farmer, hotelier, state militia officer, politician
- Known for: Service in the Black Hawk War and 1st Wisconsin Territorial Assembly
- Height: 6 ft 6 in (198 cm)
- Political party: Democratic
- Spouse: Elizabeth Hyder (first wife)
- Children: 3 sons
- Relatives: Daniel Morgan (maternal uncle)

Daniel Morgan Parkinson (October 20, 1790 – October 1, 1868) was a farmer, hotelier, state militia officer, and holder of various offices in frontier Wisconsin, including in the legislature.

== Background ==
Parkinson was born on October 20, 1790, in Carter County, Tennessee, sixth son of Scottish immigrant Peter Parkinson. His mother, born Mary Morgan, was the sister of Founding Father Daniel Morgan of Virginia, and the boy was named after his famous uncle. His father dies when he was two years old, and he was unable to spend much time in formal study, instead taking up farming. He married fellow Tennessee native Elizabeth Hyder (a cousin of General Wade Hampton), with whom he had three sons.

He left his home in White County, Tennessee and moved his family to various areas in Illinois where lead mining was booming. He and his sons tried lead mining but didn't like it. After serving in the 1827 Winnebago War, Parkinson moved to New Diggings, then on to Mineral Point, in what was then Michigan Territory, where he ran an inn with his wife Rebecca "...a most excellent and popular landlady...." When the Black Hawk War broke out, Daniel and his son Peter Parkinson served as officers of the territorial militia under Henry Dodge, including in the decisive Battle of Wisconsin Heights. Six foot six inches in height "with bone, muscle and flesh to correspond", he was accounted an expert Indian fighter.

During the war, the Parkinsons spent some time in the stockade of Fort Defiance, five miles southeast of Mineral Point. In 1832 Daniel bought 80 acres of land in Willow Springs, Wisconsin in Lafayette County, a half mile from the fort, on the Military Road from Mineral Point to Galena. In 1833 he began building his hotel, tavern and home there on the hilltop. This two-story I-house building, called the Prairie Spring Hotel, was still standing in 2021.

== Public office ==
Parkinson, a Democrat, was elected a delegate to the 1st Wisconsin Territorial Assembly (which met thrice between October 25, 1836, and June 25, 1838); and again for the Third, which met twice between December 7, 1840, and February 19, 1842.

In 1837 he was involved in incorporating the village of Mineral Point. In 1846 he represented Lafayette County at the first Constitutional Convention. In 1849 he served in the new state of Wisconsin's second State Assembly. In 1850, he was the Democratic nominee for the Wisconsin's 5th State Senate district, but lost to Whig Levi Sterling. In the 1850s he served on the Lafayette county board of supervisors, representing Willow Springs.

== Death and heritage ==
Parkinson outlived three wives. He died on October 1, 1868, at his Willow Springs home, accompanied by his son, Peter Parkinson, who had by that time himself served in the Assembly.
