= Star Theatre (Argyle, Wisconsin) =

- U.S. National Register of Historic Places
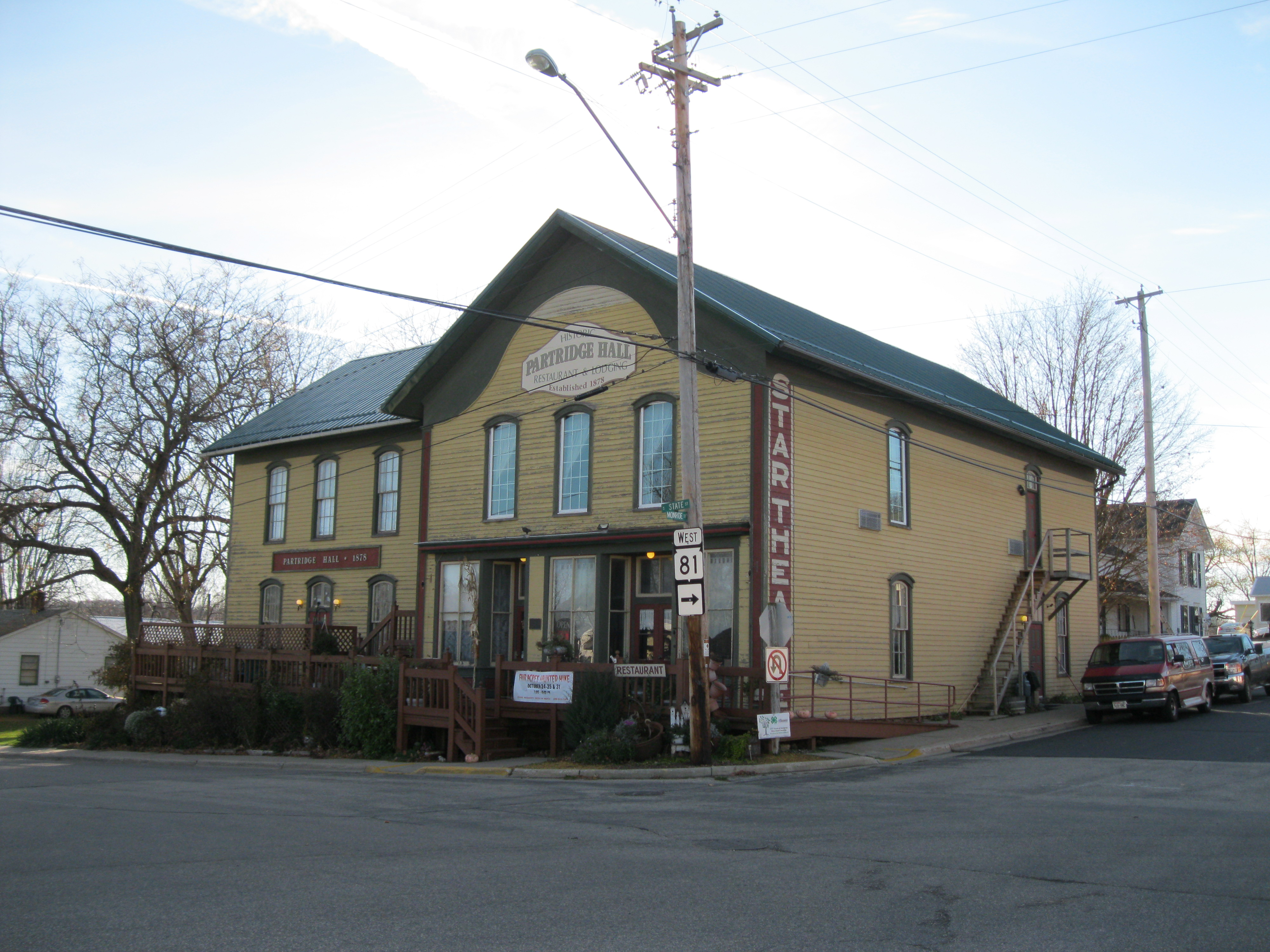

- Location within Wisconsin Location within the United States
- Location: 200 S. State St., Argyle, Wisconsin
- Coordinates: 42°41′59″N 89°52′2″W
- Built: 1878
- Architect: Alanson Partridge
- NRHP reference No.: 80000154
- Added to NRHP: November 7, 1980

Star Theatre, also known as Partridge Hall, is a shop/meeting hall/theater built in 1878 in Argyle, Wisconsin, in Lafayette County, Wisconsin, United States. It was listed on the National Register of Historic Places in 1980.

Alanson Partridge was a carpenter who moved from New York to Wisconsin in 1856. In 1878 he built the north wing of the building, with his carpentry shop on the first floor and a large hall above. It was called Partridge Hall, and rented for meetings, dances, and meals. Partridge himself sponsored some events like a Christmas Ball, and advertised it with barkers in the streets. Partridge advocated temperance, so alcohol was not served there. Some time after 1881 he added the south wing.

The building is two stories, frame covered with clapboards. Most of the windows have curved tops and the east gable is decorated with a bell-shaped fascia. The hall on the second floor had a stage.

In 1908 Partridge sold his hall to Argyle's Modern Woodmen of America. They continued to rent out the hall, and it remained a social center of the community, hosting meetings, proms, lectures, roller skating, and basketball games. In 1920 the hall was renamed the Star Theatre, and began to show motion pictures: silent films and talkies.

In 1945 the movies stopped and the building sat idle. For a while it was used as a hatchery. Around 1980 it was restored to house shops and a restaurant.
