= John Sheldon (Wisconsin politician) =

American farmer and businessman (1865–1933)

John P. Sheldon
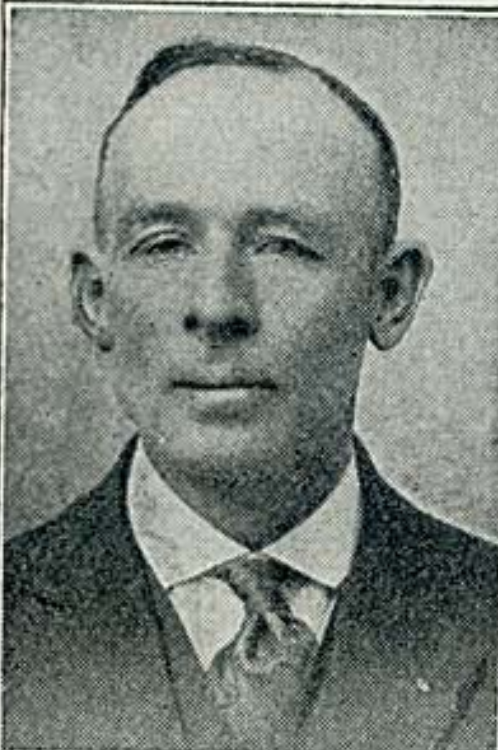

Member of the Wisconsin State Assembly from the Lafayette district
- In office January 1, 1919 – January 1, 1921
- Preceded by: Julius M. Engebretson
- Succeeded by: James U. Goodman

Personal details
- Born: John Pitts Sheldon; June 13, 1865 Willow Springs, Wisconsin
- Died: July 25, 1933 (aged 68) Darlington, Wisconsin
- Resting place: Union Grove Cemetery; Darlington, Wisconsin
- Party: Republican
- Spouses: Irene Walker; (died 1943)
- Parents: Thomas Hanford Sheldon (father); Mary Hannah (Pilling) Sheldon (mother)

John Pitts Sheldon (June 13, 1865 – July 25, 1933) was an American politician, farmer, and farm implement dealer. He was a member of the Wisconsin State Assembly, serving one term and representing Lafayette County, Wisconsin.

== Biography ==
Born on his family farm in the town of Willow Springs, Lafayette County, Wisconsin, Sheldon was a farmer and farm implement dealer. In 1913, he moved to Darlington, Wisconsin. Sheldon served on the Lafayette County Board of Supervisors, the Darlington Common Council, and the school board. In 1919, Sheldon served in the Wisconsin State Assembly and was a Republican. Sheldon died at his home in Darlington, Wisconsin, and was in ill health.

== Electoral history ==
Wisconsin Assembly, Lafayette District Election, 1918
Party	Candidate	Votes	%	±%
General Election, November 5, 1918
Republican	John P. Sheldon	1,967	58.70%	
Democratic	Richard M. Finley	1,384	41.30%	
Total votes		'3,351'	'100.0%'	
Republican hold				
