= Therese A. Jenkins =

American suffragist (1853–1936)

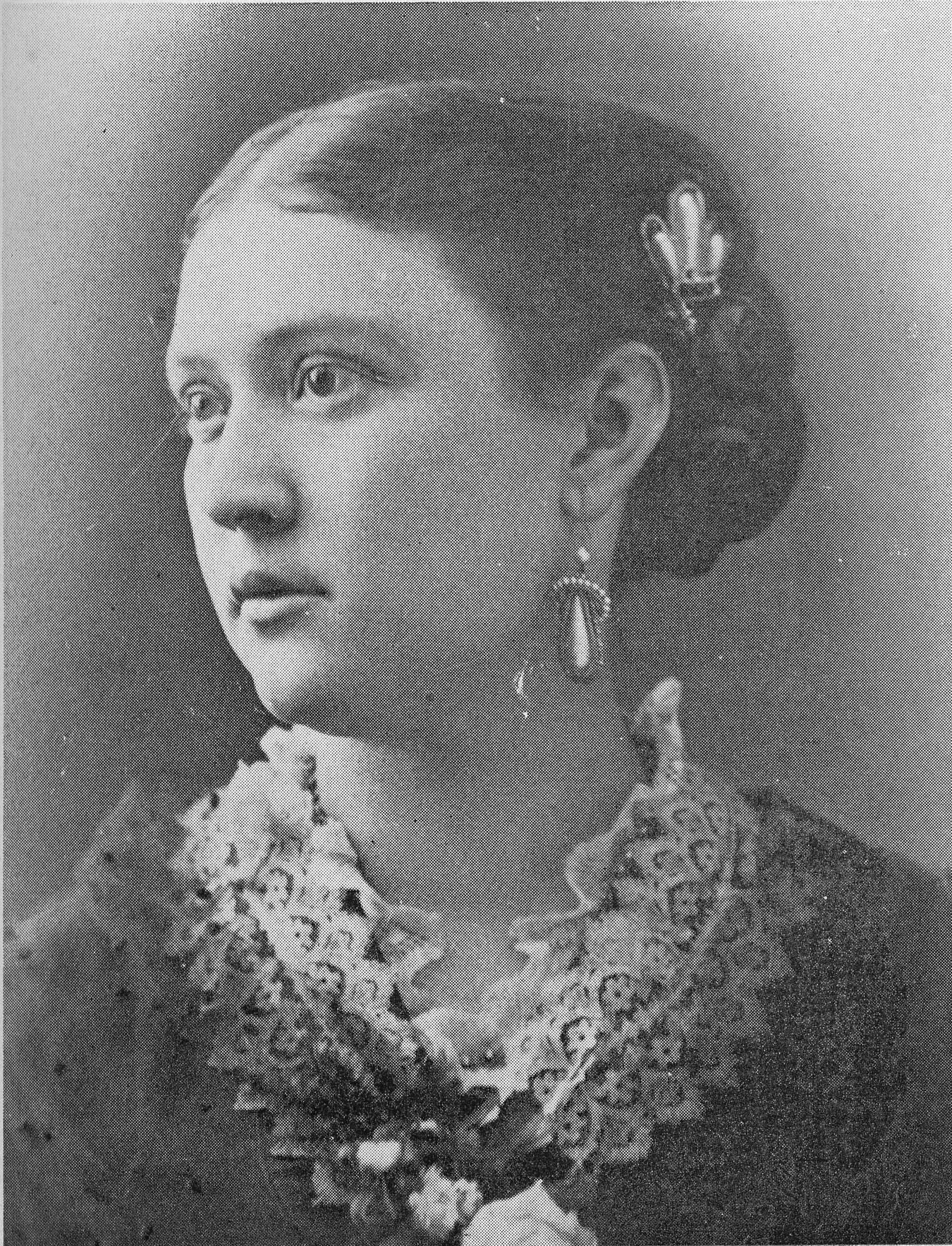
- Jenkins c. 1870s
- Born: Therese Alberta Parkinson; May 1, 1853; Fayette, Wisconsin, U.S.
- Died: February 28, 1936 (aged 82)
- Resting place: Lakeview Cemetery, Cheyenne, Wyoming, U.S.
- Occupation: Suffragist
- Known for: Saving women's suffrage in the U.S. state of Wyoming
- Spouse: James Flood Jenkins (m. 1877; died 1928)
- Children: 4
- Father: Peter Parkinson
- Relatives: Daniel Morgan Parkinson (grandfather)

Therese Alberta Parkinson Jenkins (May 1, 1853 – February 28, 1936) was an American suffragist, credited with saving women's suffrage in the State of Wyoming. She was the first woman delegate to any Republican National Convention, the one in Minneapolis in 1892.

== Early life ==
Therese Alberta Parkinson was born in Fayette, Wisconsin, on May 1, 1853. She was the daughter of the Peter "Badger Pete" Parkinson (1813-1895), one of the pioneers of Wisconsin, who fought in the Black Hawk War and won military honors, and Cleantha Stone Welch (1825-1863).

== Career ==
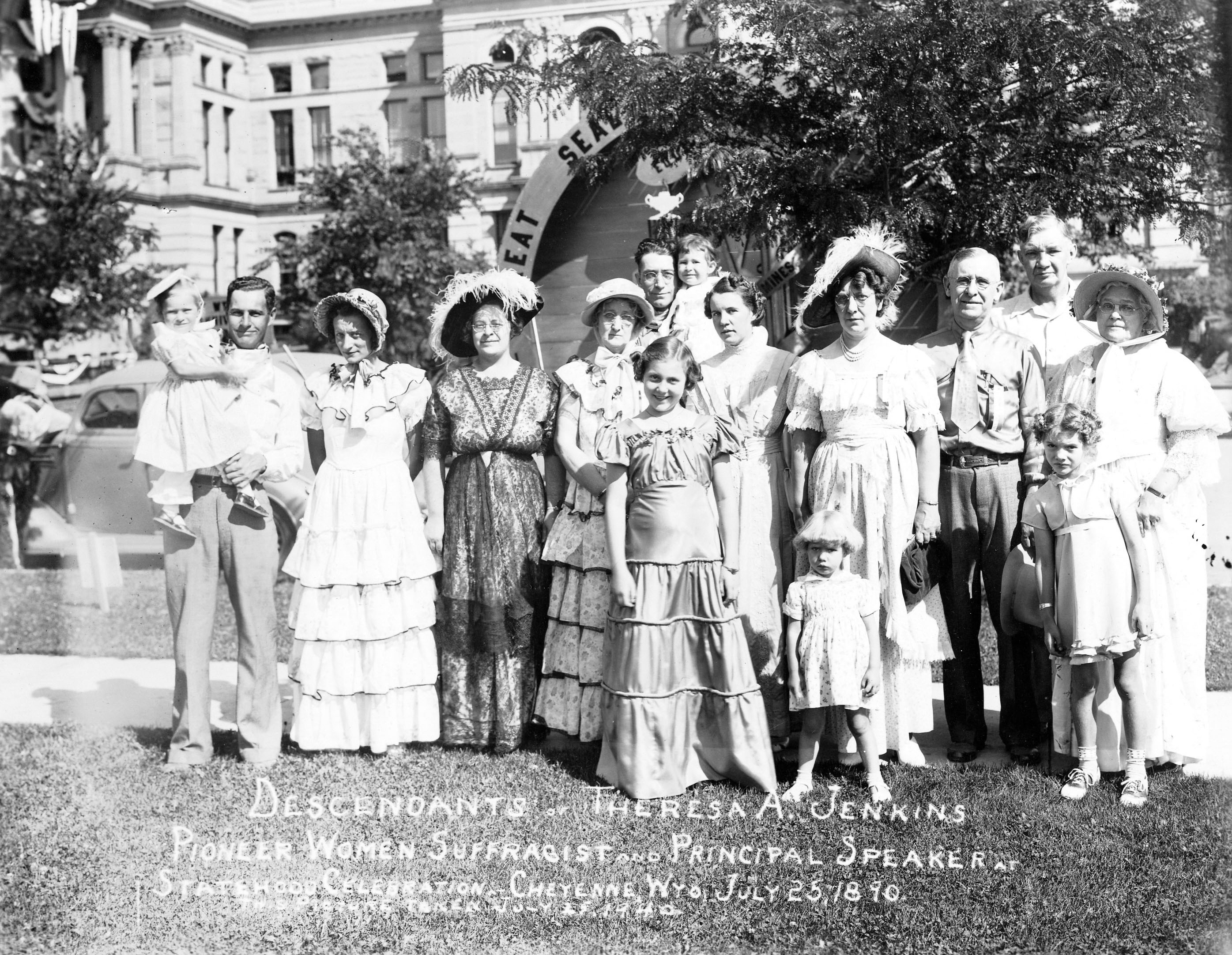
Wyoming Statehood Day Celebration, 1890

Beginning in 1887, Jenkins worked to secure equal rights and justice for all citizens. She was one of the orators of the day when Wyoming's admission to statehood was celebrated on July 23, 1890, and her address on that occasion was powerful and brilliant. She did much journalistic work. In April 1889, she contributed to the Popular Science a striking paper entitled "The Mental Force of Woman", in reply to Professor Cope's article on "The Relation of the Sexes to the Government", in a preceding number of that journal. She contributed a number of graceful poems to The Denver Times and other journals. She was the regular Wyoming correspondent of the Omaha Central West, The Woman's Tribune and The Union Signal.

In 1891 she was named National Superintendent of the Franchise for her work to protect women's suffrage in the new constituted Wyoming. She joined the amendment campaigns in Colorado in 1893 and Kansas in 1894.

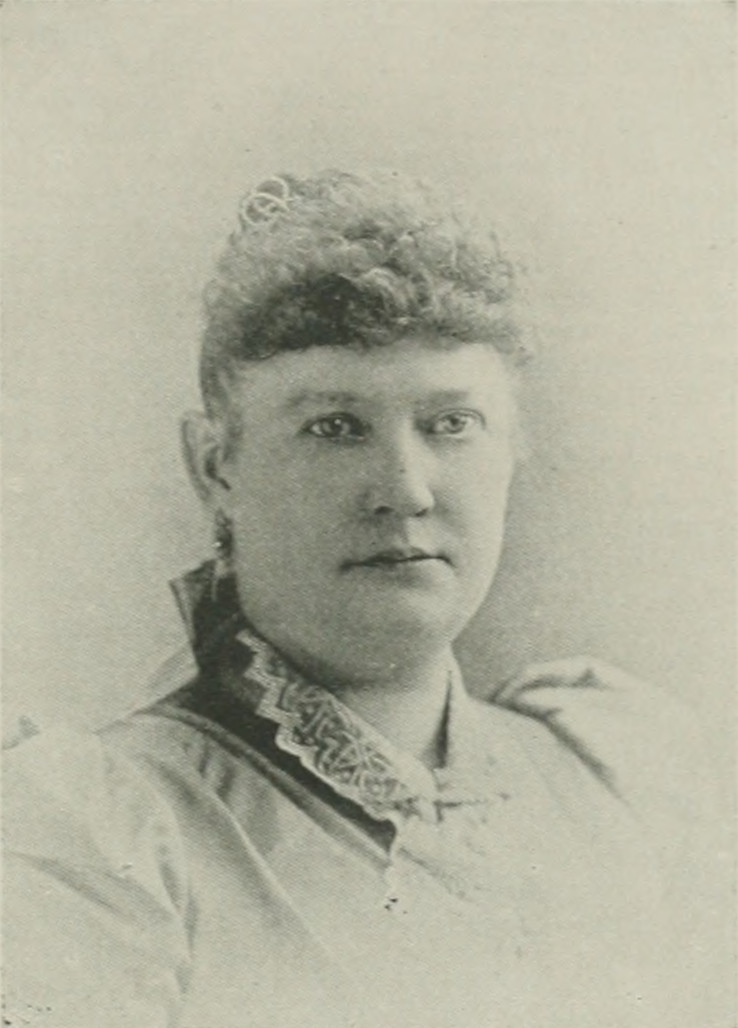
Therese A. Jenkins, a woman of the century, 1893

Jenkins and Cora Georgiana Snow Carleton were sent as alternate delegates to the Republican national convention in Minneapolis, Minnesota, in 1892. She was active in church work and was a member of the Woman's Relief Corps and, inspired by Frances Willard, she organized the local Woman's Christian Temperance Union (WCTU) in 1883; she advocated prohibition in Wyoming.

== Personal life ==
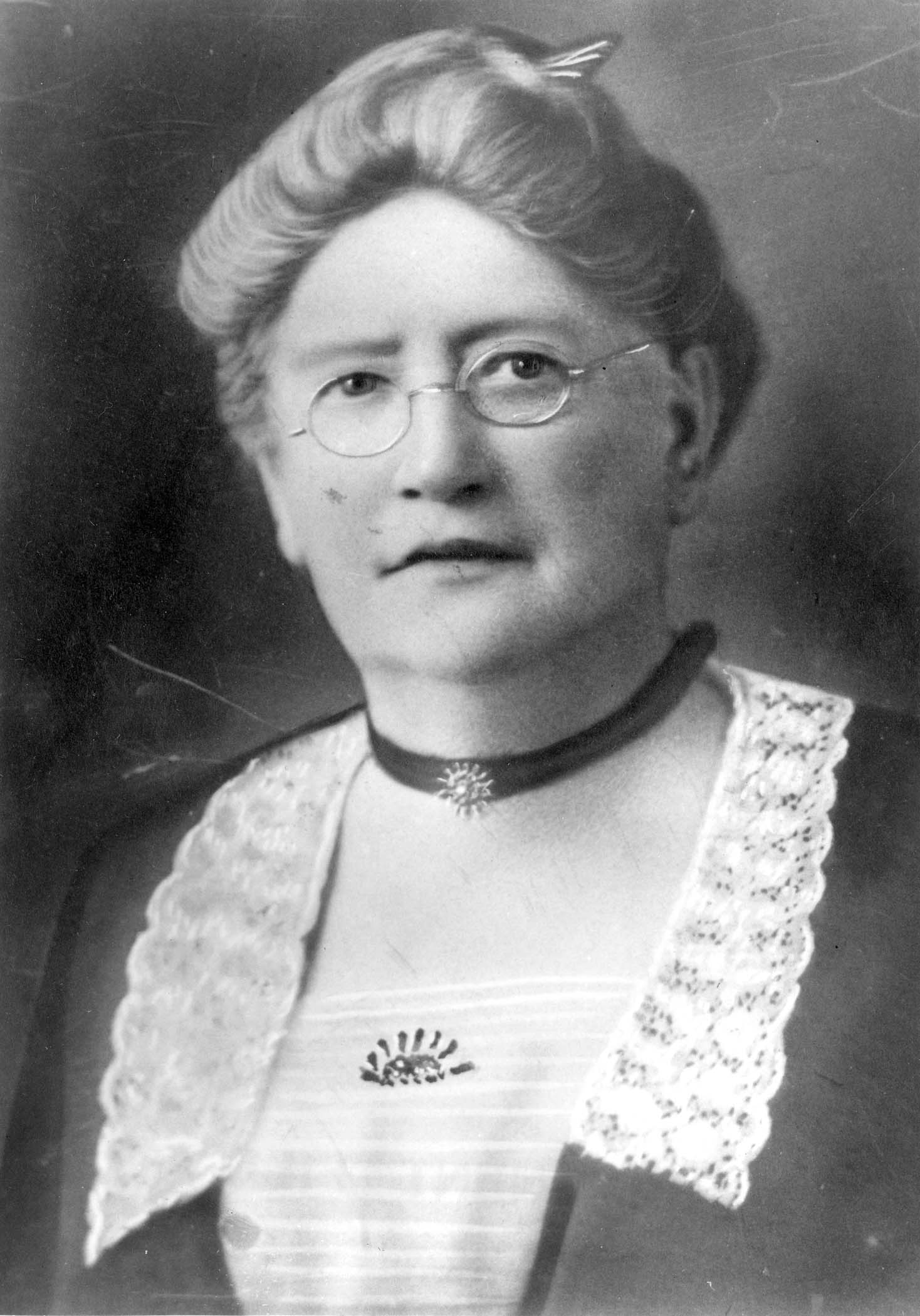
Therese A. Jenkins, ca 1910s

Parkinson moved from Wisconsin to Wyoming in 1877. On December 20, 1877, she married James Flood Jenkins (1852-1928), a commissary clerk and later wealthy merchant of Cheyenne, Wyoming. She had four children: May Jenkins (1879-1879), Elsie C. Jenkins (b. 1881), Horace M. Jenkins (b. 1882) and Agnes W. Jenkins (b. 1889).

She died on February 28, 1936, and is buried at Lakeview Cemetery, Cheyenne, with her husband.
