= James V. Hollman =

American politician

James V. Hollman (April 11, 1835 – February 2, 1916) was an American merchant and politician.

Hollman was born in Elk Grove, Lafayette County, Michigan Territory. He went to the public schools and was involved in the mercantile business in Platteville, Wisconsin. He served in the Wisconsin Assembly in 1885 and 1886 and was a Republican. Hollman died at his home in Platteville, Wisconsin.
