= Eugene Parkinson =

Eugene Parkinson may refer to:

- Eugene D. Parkinson, American farmer and politician
- Eugene Condell Leonard Parkinson, Jamaican politician
