= Robert C. Hoard =

American smelter, attorney and politician (c.1787–1867)

Robert C. Hoard (c. 1787 – May 10, 1867) was an American smelter, attorney, and politician from Mineral Point, Wisconsin Territory who served in the legislature of the Territory and held other local offices, including that of militia captain during the Black Hawk War.

== In Wisconsin ==
Hoard settled in Mineral Point in 1828 (he would live there the rest of his life), and with his partner John Long was the first to build a smelting furnace in the area, two miles east of "the Point." In 1831, Hoard built a smelting furnace in Kendall.

== Black Hawk War ==
During the Black Hawk War, Hoard was the Iowa County militia commander of the stockade Fort Defiance, about five miles southeast of Mineral Point. Hoard and the 65 militiamen under him were called into service May 21, 1832, and mustered out August 20, 1832.

== Public office ==
In April 1831, Hoard was a member of the first organized Iowa County county board meeting, representing the Pecatonica electoral precinct.

In 1835, those parts of Michigan Territory who were not set to become part of the new State of Michigan were invited to elect members to a seventh and last Michigan Territorial Council (the so-called "Rump Council"). Hoard was elected from Iowa County, but resigned almost as quickly as his election was certified (elected October 5, resigned October 9), and thus was one of the four (out of thirteen) who did not attend the "Rump Council" when it met (briefly) in January of 1836.

In 1837 and 1838, Hoard was appointed twice as a commissioner to lay out territorial highways which were to pass through Mineral Point.

In April of 1838, after the creation of Wisconsin Territory and the separation of other areas into new counties, the remainder of Iowa County held its first county board meeting, and Hoard was one of the three members of what was now called the county's board of commissioners. In 1840-1841, he was serving as attorney for Iowa County.

== Death ==
Hoard died May 10, 1867, at his home in Mineral Point, "aged about 80 years" and was buried in the Old City Cemetery.
