= Lamont, Wisconsin =

- Town
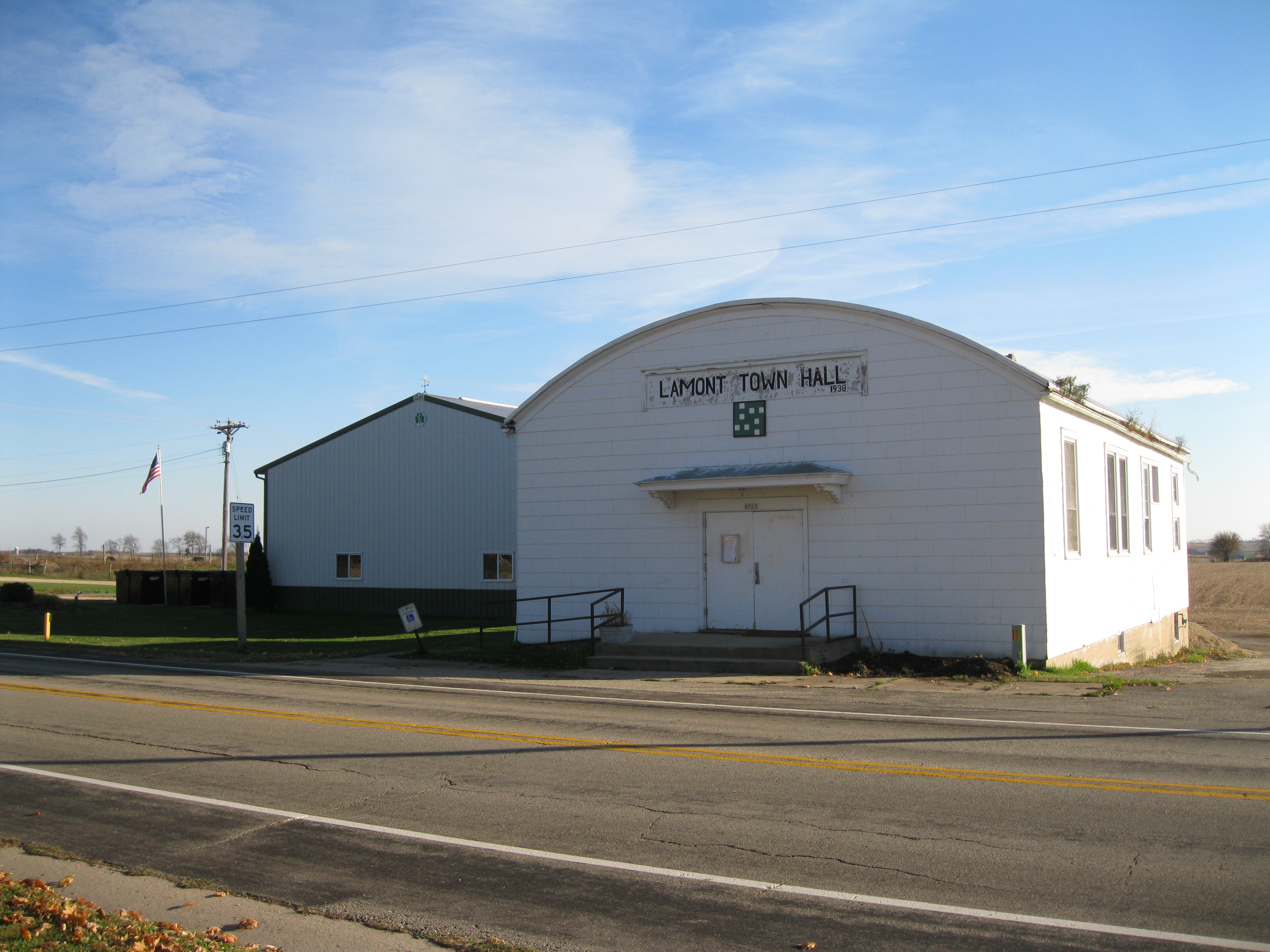
- Lamont Town Hall

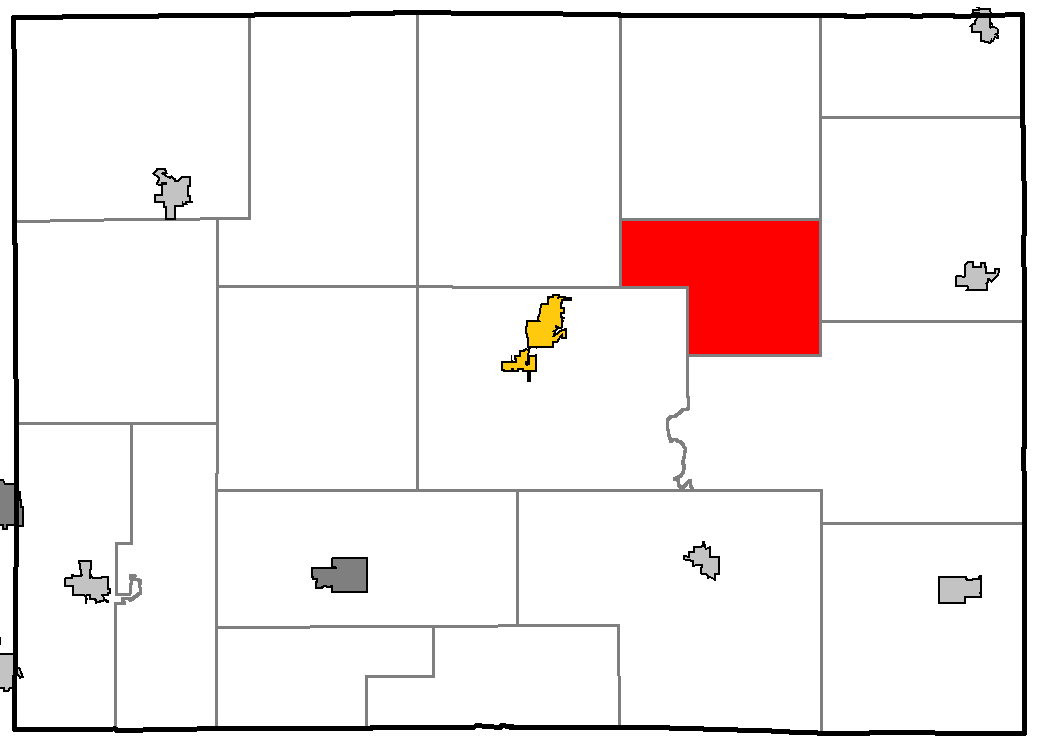
- Location of Lamont, within Lafayette County, Wisconsin

- Location of Lafayette County, Wisconsin
- Coordinates: 42°42′7″N 90°0′28″W
- Country: United States
- State: Wisconsin
- County: Lafayette

Area
  - Total: 19.93 sq mi (51.62 km^{2})
  - Land: 19.93 sq mi (51.62 km^{2})
  - Water: 0 sq mi (0.0 km^{2})
- Elevation: 1,037 ft (316 m)

Population (2020)
  - Total: 313
  - Density: 15.7/sq mi (6.06/km^{2})
- Time zone: UTC-6 (Central (CST))
  - Summer (DST): UTC-5 (CDT)
- ZIP Codes: 53530 (Darlington); 53504 (Argyle)
- Area code: 608
- FIPS code: 55-42175
- GNIS feature ID: 1583522

Lamont is a town in Lafayette County, Wisconsin, United States. The population was 313 at the 2020 census, slightly down from 314 at the 2010 census. The unincorporated community of Lamont is located in the town.

== Geography ==
Lamont is in the eastern part of Lafayette County. According to the United States Census Bureau, the town has a total area of 19.9 square miles (51.6 km^{2}), all land. Two-thirds of the town drains west to Otter Creek, a tributary of the Pecatonica River, just outside the western town border, and the other third drains east toward the East Branch of the Pecatonica.

== Demographics ==
Historical population
Census	Pop.	Note	%±
2000	267		—
2010	314		17.6%
2020	313		−0.3%

As of the census of 2000, there were 267 people, 94 households, and 76 families residing in the town. The population density was 13.4 people per square mile (5.2/km^{2}). There were 102 housing units at an average density of 5.1 per square mile (2.0/km^{2}). The racial makeup of the town was 100.00% White. Hispanic or Latino of any race were 0.75% of the population.

There were 94 households, out of which 36.2% had children under the age of 18 living with them, 73.4% were married couples living together, 4.3% had a female householder with no husband present, and 18.1% were non-families. 12.8% of all households were made up of individuals, and 9.6% had someone living alone who was 65 years of age or older. The average household size was 2.84 and the average family size was 3.14.

In the town, the population was spread out, with 26.6% under the age of 18, 6.7% from 18 to 24, 30.0% from 25 to 44, 24.3% from 45 to 64, and 12.4% who were 65 years of age or older. The median age was 39 years. For every 100 females, there were 115.3 males. For every 100 females age 18 and over, there were 117.8 males.

The median income for a household in the town was $40,156, and the median income for a family was $42,031. Males had a median income of $21,818 versus $23,125 for females. The per capita income for the town was $15,355. About 8.6% of families and 10.4% of the population were below the poverty line, including 17.7% of those under the age of 18 and 10.3% of those 65 or over.
