= Lamont (community), Wisconsin =

Lamont, Wisconsin
- Unincorporated community
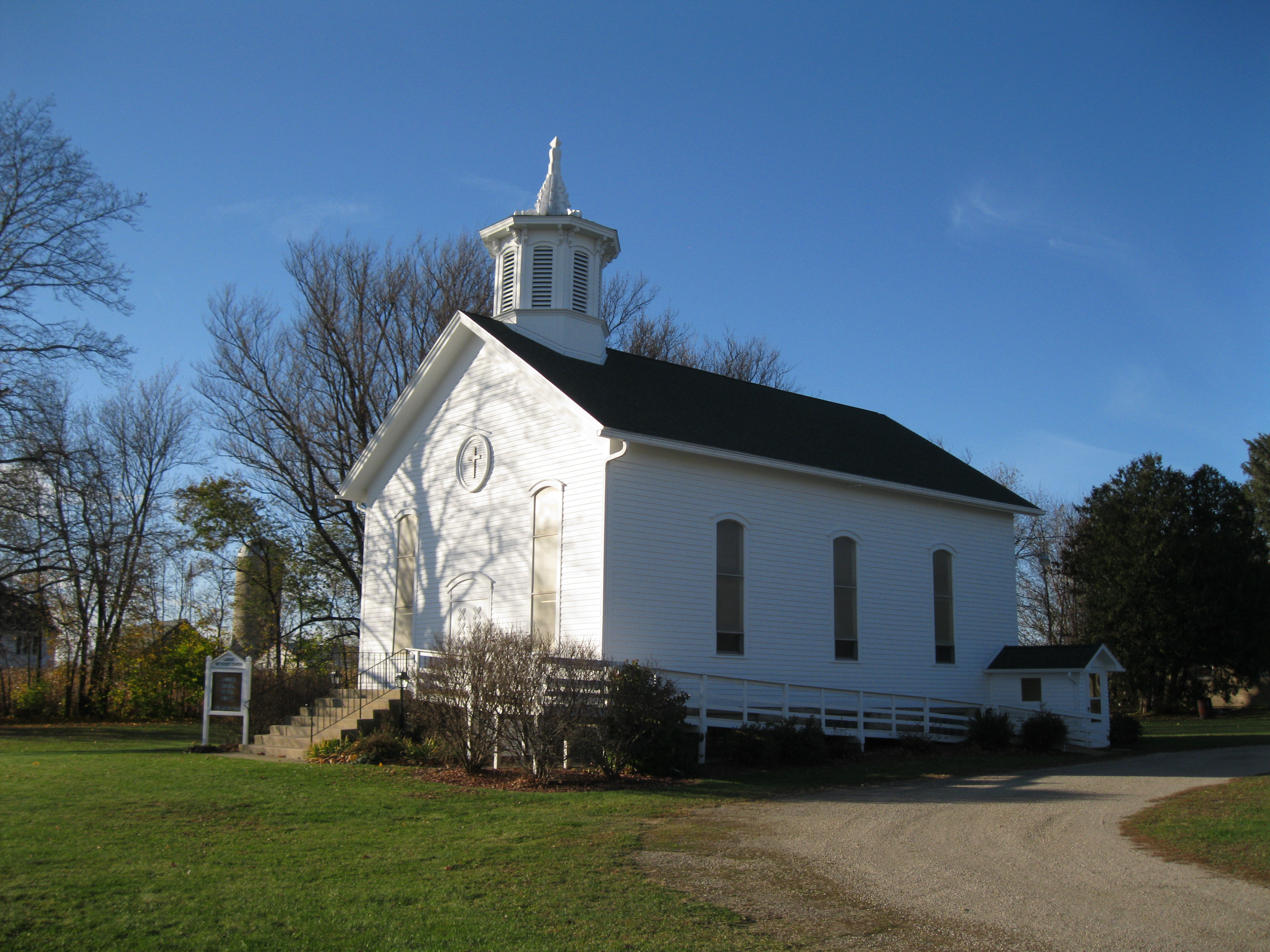
- Lamont Methodist Church

- Location within Wisconsin Location within the United States
- Coordinates: 42°42′17″N 89°59′07″W
- Country: United States
- State: Wisconsin
- County: Lafayette
- Town: Lamont
- Elevation: 1,073 ft (327 m)
- Time zone: UTC-6 (Central (CST))
  - Summer (DST): UTC-5 (CDT)
- Area code: 608
- GNIS feature ID: 1567819

Lamont is an unincorporated community in the town of Lamont, Lafayette County, Wisconsin, United States.

== Notable person ==
James U. Goodman (1872–1953), farmer, businessman, and politician, lived in the town of Lamont; he served as chairman of the Lamont Town Board.

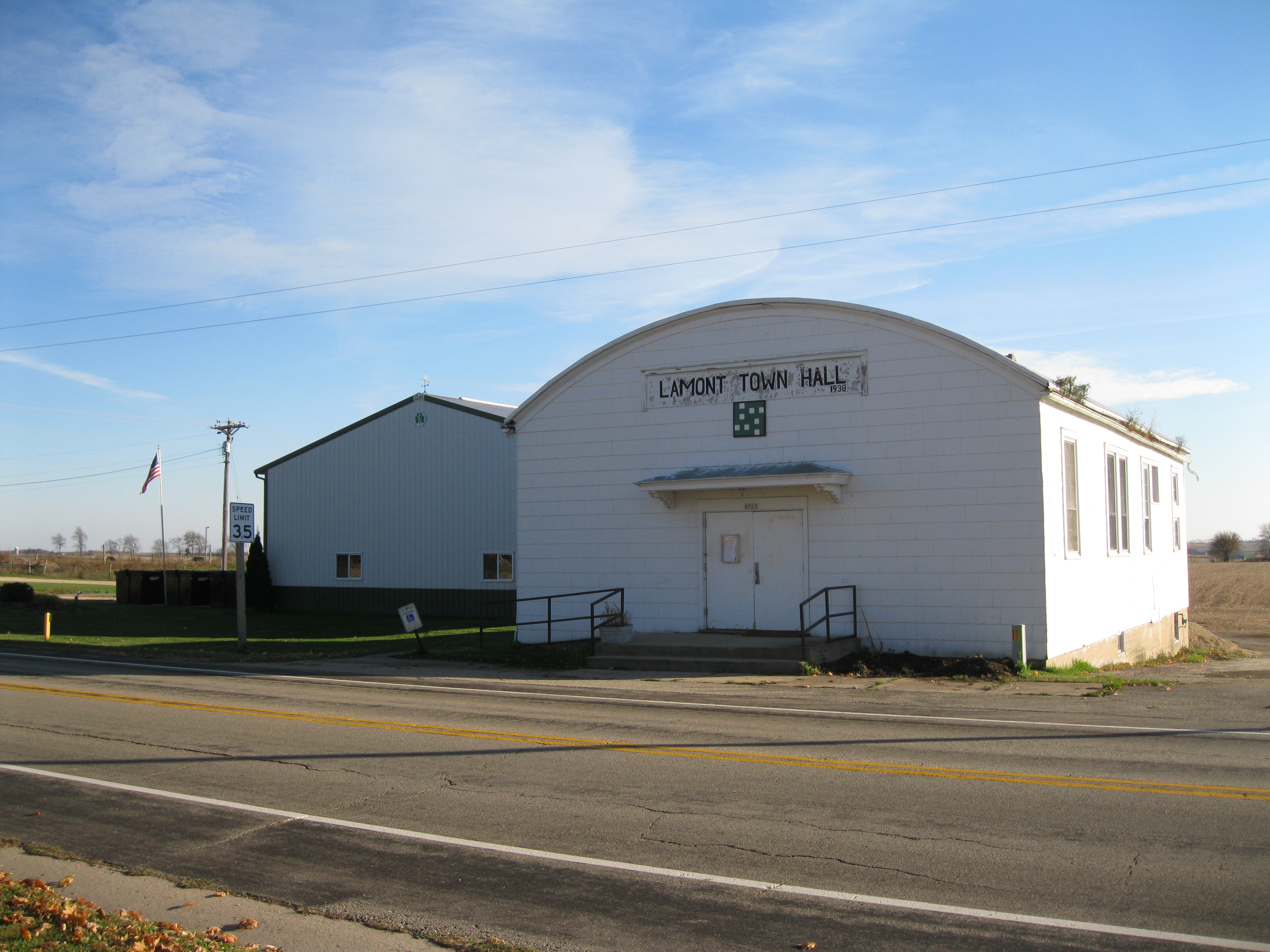
Lamont Town Hall
