= Kendall, Wisconsin =

Kendall is the name of some places in the U.S. state of Wisconsin:

- Kendall, Lafayette County, Wisconsin, a town
- Kendall, Monroe County, Wisconsin, a village
