= Yellowstone River (Wisconsin) =

Location
- Country: United States
- Location: Iowa and Lafayette counties, Wisconsin

Physical characteristics
- Source
  - location: Southern Iowa County
  - coordinates: 46.473957°N 92.03194°W
  - elevation: 794 ft (242 m)
- Mouth
  - location: East Branch Pecatonica River
  - coordinates: 42.8674986°N 90.0709579°W
- Length: 42.0 km (26.1 mi)
- Discharge
  - location: mouth
  - average: 55.53 cu ft/s (1.572 m^{3}/s) (estimate)

Basin features
- GNIS ID: 1577097

The Yellowstone River is a 42.0-kilometre (26.1 mi) river in Iowa and Lafayette counties in the U.S. state of Wisconsin. The river's source is in rural Iowa County east of Mineral Point, and its mouth is at the East Branch Pecatonica River northwest of Argyle.

The river is dammed at Yellowstone Lake, a popular fishing area which is protected as Yellowstone Lake State Park. An additional 4,000 acres (1,600 ha) of its watershed is part of the Yellowstone Wildlife Area.
