= Yellowstone, Wisconsin =

- Unincorporated community
- Location within Wisconsin Location within the United States
- Coordinates: 42°47′54″N 89°58′13″W
- Country: United States
- State: Wisconsin
- County: Lafayette
- Town: Fayette
- Elevation: 912 ft (278 m)
- Time zone: UTC-6 (Central (CST))
  - Summer (DST): UTC-5 (CDT)
- Area code: 608
- GNIS feature ID: 1577897

Yellowstone is an unincorporated community in the town of Fayette in Lafayette County, Wisconsin, United States.

== History ==
Zenas H. Gurley, Sr. led a branch of the LDS church in the 1850s in Yellowstone.
