= Belmont (town), Wisconsin =

Belmont, Wisconsin
- Town
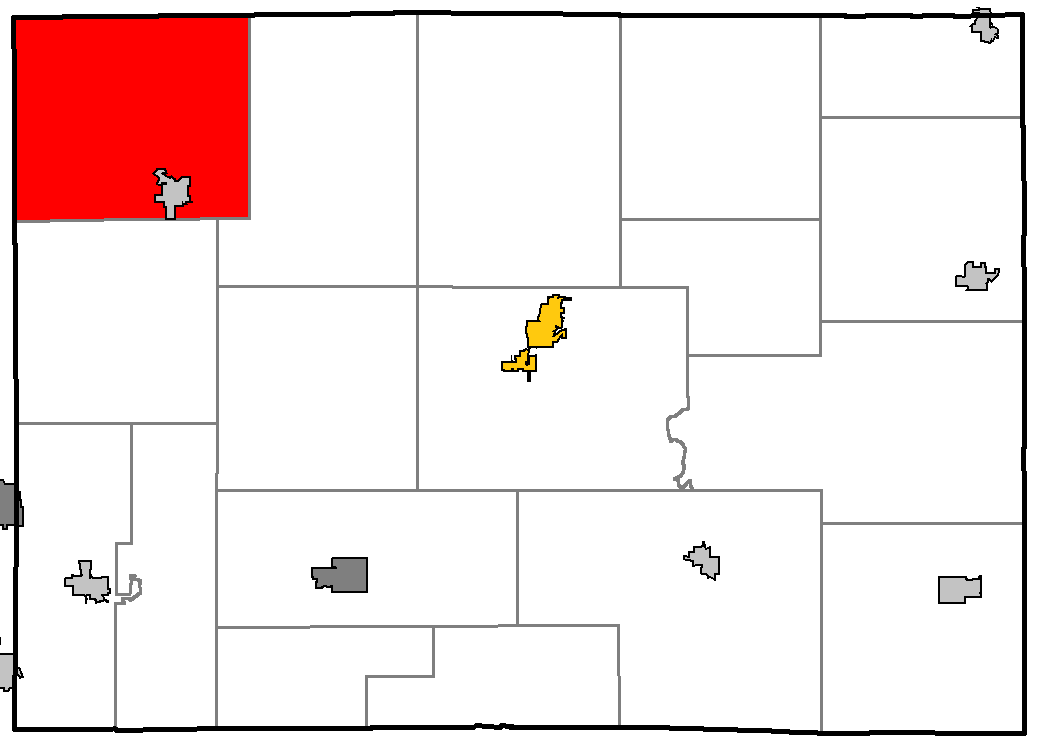
- Location of Belmont, within Lafayette County, Wisconsin

- Location within Wisconsin Location within the United States
- Coordinates: 42°46′11″N 90°21′28″W
- Country: United States
- State: Wisconsin
- County: Lafayette

Area
  - Total: 41.03 sq mi (106.28 km^{2})
  - Land: 40.93 sq mi (106.01 km^{2})
  - Water: 0.10 sq mi (0.27 km^{2})
- Elevation: 1,185 ft (361 m)

Population (2020)
  - Total: 794
  - Density: 19.4/sq mi (7.49/km^{2})
- Time zone: UTC-6 (Central (CST))
  - Summer (DST): UTC-5 (CDT)
- Area code: 608
- FIPS code: 55-065-06450
- GNIS feature ID: 1582789
- Website: https://www.townofbelmont.wi.gov/

Belmont is a town in Lafayette County, Wisconsin, United States. The population was 794 at the 2020 census, up from 676 at the 2000 census. The village of Belmont is located in the southeastern part of the town. The unincorporated community of Leslie close to the center of the town.

== Geography ==
Belmont occupies the northwestern corner of Lafayette County and is bordered to the north by Iowa County and to the west by Grant County. According to the United States Census Bureau, the town has a total area of 41.0 square miles (106.3 km^{2}), of which 0.1 square miles (0.3 km^{2}), or 0.25%, are water.

== Demographics ==
Historical population
Census	Pop.	Note	%±
2000	676		—
2010	767		13.5%
2020	794		3.5%

As of the census of 2000, there were 676 people, 249 households, and 186 families residing in the town. The population density was 16.4 people per square mile (6.3/km^{2}). There were 283 housing units at an average density of 6.9 per square mile (2.6/km^{2}). The racial makeup of the town was 98.52% White, 0.15% Native American, 0.44% from other races, and 0.89% from two or more races. 1.18% of the population were Hispanic or Latino of any race.

There were 249 households, out of which 39.8% had children under the age of 18 living with them, 59.0% were married couples living together, 10.4% had a female householder with no husband present, and 24.9% were non-families. 19.3% of all households were made up of individuals, and 4.8% had someone living alone who was 65 years of age or older. The average household size was 2.70 and the average family size was 3.11.

In the town, the population was spread out, with 29.9% under the age of 18, 8.0% from 18 to 24, 30.6% from 25 to 44, 21.7% from 45 to 64, and 9.8% who were 65 years of age or older. The median age was 34 years. For every 100 females, there were 106.7 males. For every 100 females age 18 and over, there were 111.6 males.

The median income for a household in the town was $39,196, and the median income for a family was $40,000. Males had a median income of $28,750 versus $21,339 for females. The per capita income for the town was $16,879. About 4.2% of families and 7.4% of the population were below the poverty line, including 8.5% of those under age 18 and none of those age 65 or over.
