= Argyle (town), Wisconsin =

Argyle, Wisconsin
- Town
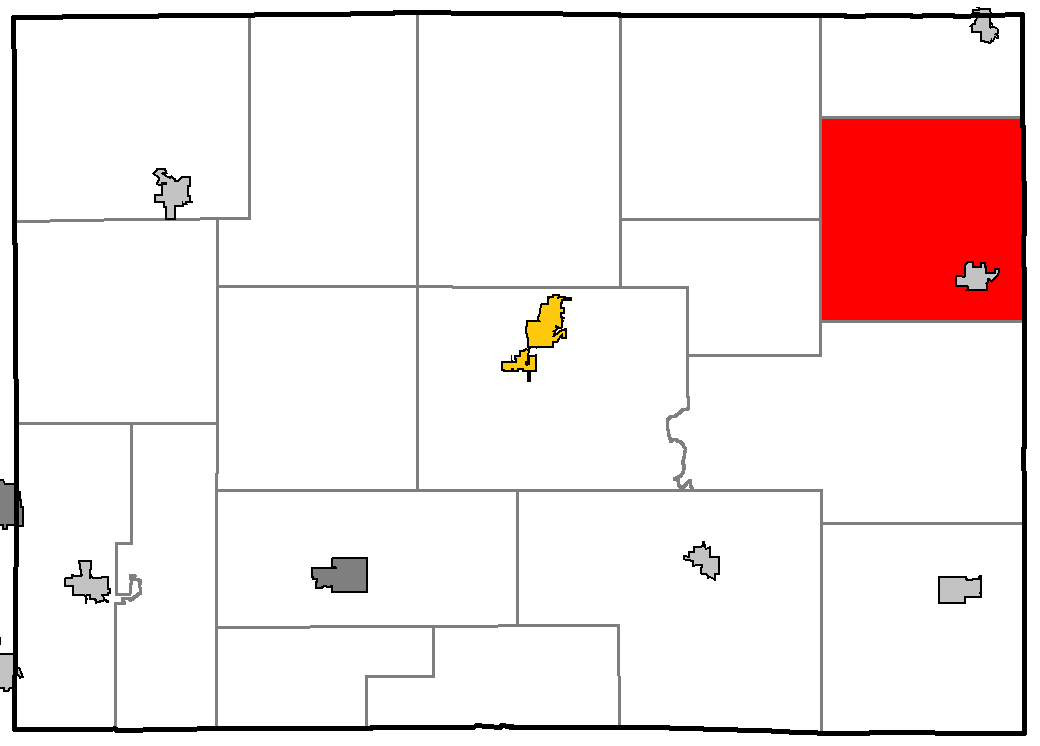
- Location of Argyle, within Lafayette County, Wisconsin

- Location within Wisconsin Location within the United States
- Coordinates: 42°43′35″N 89°53′49″W
- Country: United States
- State: Wisconsin
- County: Lafayette

Area
  - Total: 35.59 sq mi (92.18 km^{2})
  - Land: 35.54 sq mi (92.04 km^{2})
  - Water: 0.054 sq mi (0.14 km^{2})
- Elevation: 802 ft (244 m)

Population (2020)
  - Total: 449
  - Density: 12.6/sq mi (4.88/km^{2})
- Time zone: UTC-6 (Central (CST))
  - Summer (DST): UTC-5 (CDT)
- ZIP Codes: 53504 (Argyle); 53516 (Blanchardville)
- Area code: 608
- FIPS code: 55-065-02675
- GNIS feature ID: 1582711

Argyle is a town in Lafayette County, Wisconsin, United States. The population was 449 at the 2020 census, up from 436 at the 2010 census. The village of Argyle is located within the town, but its population (which is actually larger than that of the town) is not included in the population counted for the town.

== Geography ==
The town is in northeastern Lafayette County, with its eastern border following the Green County line. The village of Argyle is in the southeastern part of the town.

According to the United States Census Bureau, the town has a total area of 35.6 square miles (92.2 km^{2}), of which 0.04 square miles (0.1 km^{2}), or 0.15%, are water. The East Branch Pecatonica River flows north-to-south through the eastern part of the town, passing the through the village of Argyle. The Yellowstone River joins the East Branch from the west, north of Argyle village. The East Branch feeds the Pecatonica River, which flows southeast to the Rock River in Illinois.

== Demographics ==
Historical population
Census	Pop.	Note	%±
2000	479		—
2010	436		−9.0%
2020	449		3.0%

As of the census of 2000, there were 479 people, 178 households, and 145 families residing in the town. The population density was 13.5 people per square mile (5.2/km^{2}). There were 210 housing units at an average density of 5.9 per square mile (2.3/km^{2}). The racial makeup of the town was 96.66% White, 0.21% Black or African American, 1.25% Native American, 0.21% Pacific Islander, 0.21% from other races, and 1.46% from two or more races. 1.67% of the population were Hispanic or Latino of any race.

There were 178 households, out of which 33.7% had children under the age of 18 living with them, 72.5% were married couples living together, 3.9% had a female householder with no husband present, and 18.0% were non-families. 14.6% of all households were made up of individuals, and 4.5% had someone living alone who was 65 years of age or older. The average household size was 2.69 and the average family size was 2.97.

In the town, the population was spread out, with 25.3% under the age of 18, 5.2% from 18 to 24, 27.8% from 25 to 44, 22.1% from 45 to 64, and 19.6% who were 65 years of age or older. The median age was 40 years. For every 100 females, there were 118.7 males. For every 100 females age 18 and over, there were 110.6 males.

The median income for a household in the town was $39,519, and the median income for a family was $40,500. Males had a median income of $30,000 versus $22,500 for females. The per capita income for the town was $17,609. About 9.0% of families and 12.5% of the population were below the poverty line, including 19.6% of those under age 18 and 4.5% of those age 65 or over.
