= Leslie, Wisconsin =

- Unincorporated community
- Location within Wisconsin Location within the United States
- Coordinates: 42°46′14″N 90°21′59″W
- Country: United States
- State: Wisconsin
- County: Lafayette
- Town: Belmont
- Elevation: 1,161 ft (354 m)
- Time zone: UTC-6 (Central (CST))
  - Summer (DST): UTC-5 (CDT)
- Area code: 608
- GNIS feature ID: 1577699

Leslie is an unincorporated community located in the town of Belmont, Lafayette County, Wisconsin, United States. Leslie is located on County Highway G, 2.9 miles (4.7 km) northwest of the village of Belmont.

== History ==
A post office called Leslie was established in 1881, and remained in operation until it was discontinued in 1934. The community was named in honor of Leslie Johnson, the son of the original owner of the town site.
