= Darlington (town), Wisconsin =

Darlington, Wisconsin
- Town
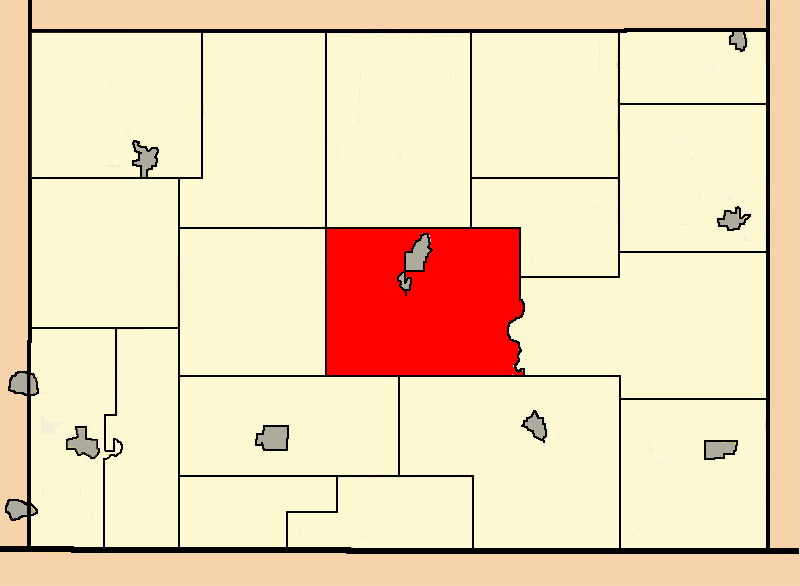
- Location of Darlington inside Lafeyette County

- Location within Wisconsin Location within the United States
- Coordinates: 42°39′45″N 90°7′12″W
- Country: United States
- State: Wisconsin
- County: Lafayette

Area
  - Total: 45.92 sq mi (118.92 km^{2})
  - Land: 45.92 sq mi (118.92 km^{2})
  - Water: 0 sq mi (0 km^{2})
- Elevation: 932 ft (284 m)

Population (2020)
  - Total: 923
  - Density: 20.1/sq mi (7.76/km^{2})
- Time zone: UTC-6 (CST)
  - Summer (DST): UTC-5 (CDT)
- ZIP Code: 53530
- Area code: 608
- FIPS code: 55-18900
- GNIS feature ID: 1583053

Darlington is a town in Lafayette County, Wisconsin, United States. The population was 923 at the 2020 census, up from 875 at the 2010 census. The city of Darlington, the Lafayette county seat, is located within the town. The unincorporated settlement of Red Rock is in the eastern part of the town.

== Geography ==
Darlington occupies the geographic center of Lafayette County and the town was originally named "Center". The city of Darlington is in the north-central part of the town. According to the United States Census Bureau, the town has a total area of 45.9 square miles (118.9 km^{2}), all land. Darlington is drained by the Pecatonica River, which flows through the northern and eastern parts of the town.

== Demographics ==
Historical population
Census	Pop.	Note	%±
2000	757		—
2010	875		15.6%
2020	923		5.5%

As of the census of 2000, there were 757 people, 266 households, and 196 families residing in the town. The population density was 16.4 people per square mile (6.3/km^{2}). There were 276 housing units at an average density of 6 per square mile (2.3/km^{2}). The racial makeup of the town was 99.74% White and 0.26% Native American. 0% of the population were Hispanic or Latino of any race.

There were 266 households, out of which 37.6% had children under the age of 18 living with them, 65.8% were married couples living together, 5.3% had a female householder with no husband present, and 26.3% were non-families. 22.2% of all households were made up of individuals, and 13.9% had someone living alone who was 65 years of age or older. The average household size was 2.8 and the average family size was 3.31.

In the town, the population was spread out, with 30.1% under the age of 18, 6.1% from 18 to 24, 26.8% from 25 to 44, 21.4% from 45 to 64, and 15.6% who were 65 years of age or older. The median age was 39 years. For every 100 females, there were 104 males. For every 100 females age 18 and over, there were 94.5 males.

The median income for a household in the town was $38,750, and the median income for a family was $43,750. Males had a median income of $32,321 versus $22,167 for females. The per capita income for the town was $16,614. About 5.4% of families and 5.1% of the population were below the poverty line, including 1.3% of those under age 18 and 12.4% of those age 65 or over.
