= Benton (town), Wisconsin =

Benton, Wisconsin
- Town
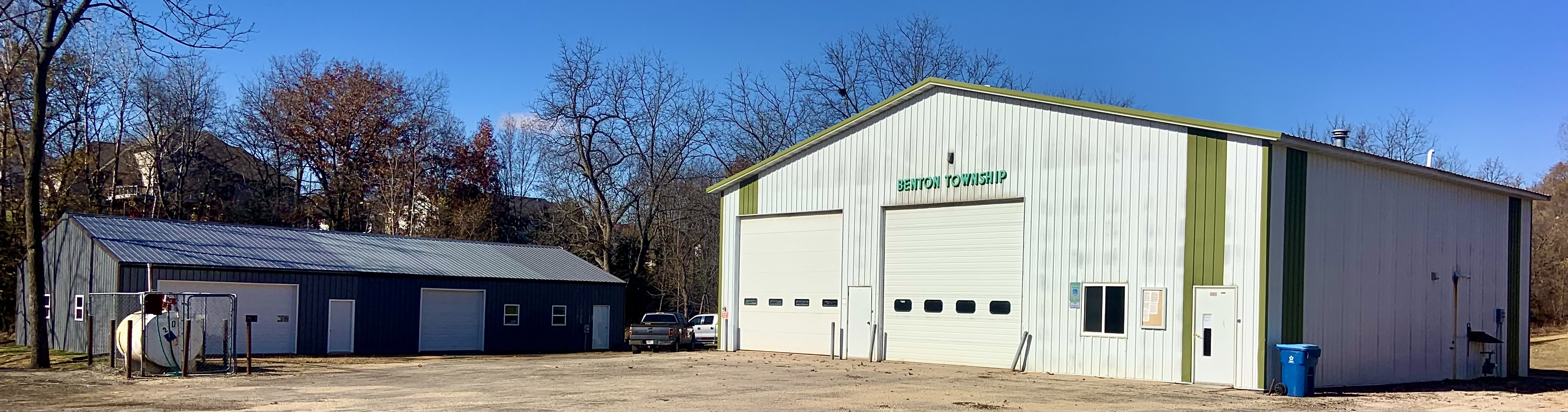
- Town hall

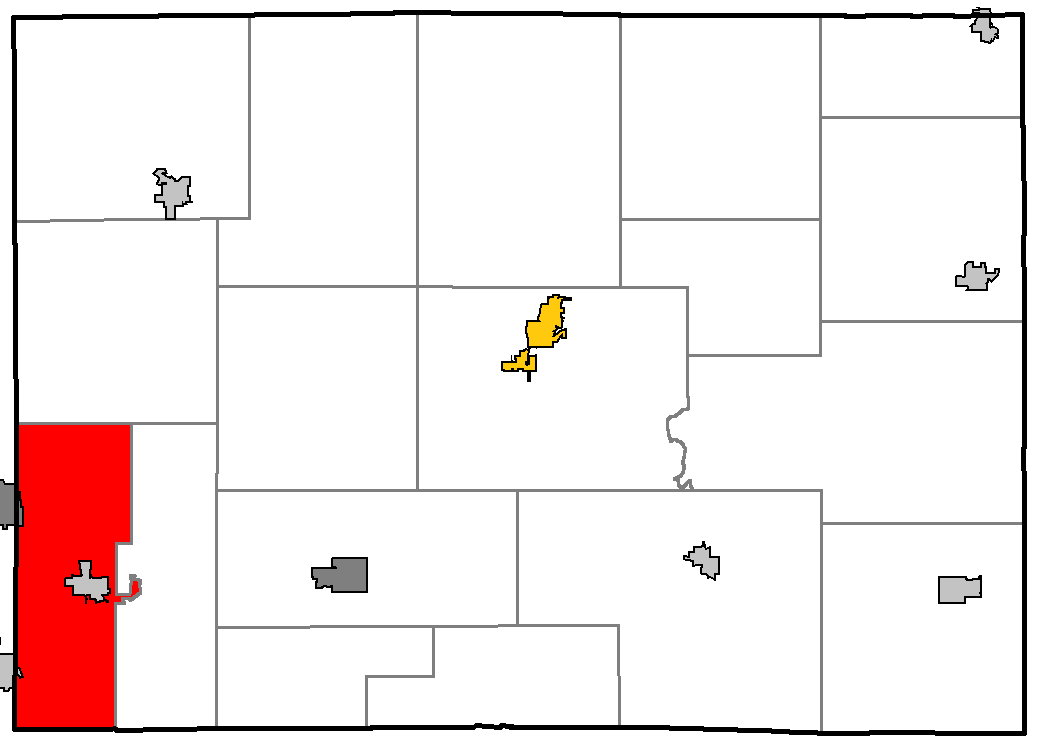
- Location of Benton, within Lafayette County, Wisconsin

- Location within Wisconsin Location within the United States
- Coordinates: 42°34′33″N 90°23′49″W
- Country: United States
- State: Wisconsin
- County: Lafayette

Area
  - Total: 28.00 sq mi (72.52 km^{2})
  - Land: 28.00 sq mi (72.52 km^{2})
  - Water: 0 sq mi (0.0 km^{2})
- Elevation: 910 ft (280 m)

Population (2020)
  - Total: 474
  - Density: 16.9/sq mi (6.54/km^{2})
- Time zone: UTC-6 (Central (CST))
  - Summer (DST): UTC-5 (CDT)
- ZIP Codes: 53803 (Benton); 53807 (Cuba City); 53811 (Hazel Green)
- Area code: 608
- FIPS code: 55-065-06850
- GNIS feature ID: 1582796

Benton is a town in Lafayette County, Wisconsin, United States. The population was 474 at the 2020 census, down from 504 at the 2010 census. The village of Benton is located within the town. The unincorporated communities of Jenkinsville and Strawbridge are also located in the town.

== Geography ==
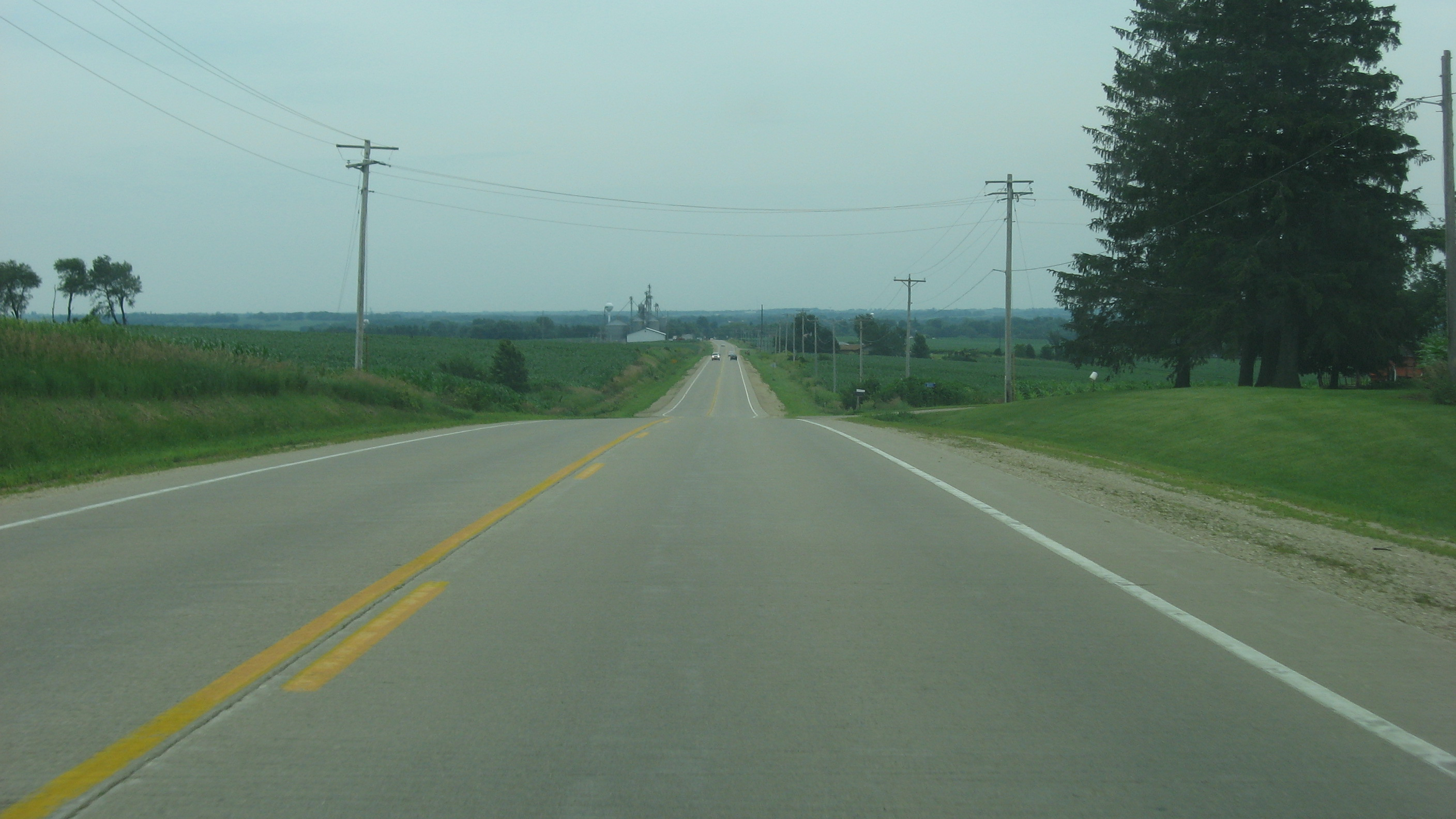
Hilly countryside west of Benton village

The town occupies the southwestern corner of Lafayette County. Its southern border is the Illinois state line, and its western border is the Grant County line. The village of Benton is just east of the center of town. The city of Cuba City, primarily in Grant County, borders the town along the northern part of its western border, and the village of Hazel Green borders the town to the southwest.

According to the United States Census Bureau, the town has a total area of 28.0 square miles (72.5 km^{2}), all land. The town is drained by the Galena River, which flows just to the east but occasionally curves into the town. The Galena is a south-flowing tributary of the Mississippi River.

== Demographics ==
Historical population
Census	Pop.	Note	%±
2000	469		—
2010	504		7.5%
2020	474		−6.0%

As of the census of 2000, there were 469 people, 159 households, and 131 families residing in the town. The population density was 16.7 people per square mile (6.5/km^{2}). There were 166 housing units at an average density of 5.9 per square mile (2.3/km^{2}). The racial makeup of the town was 99.57% White, and 0.43% from two or more races.

There were 159 households, out of which 39.0% had children under the age of 18 living with them, 74.8% were married couples living together, 5.7% had a female householder with no husband present, and 17.6% were non-families. 15.1% of all households were made up of individuals, and 5.0% had someone living alone who was 65 years of age or older. The average household size was 2.95 and the average family size was 3.28.

In the town, the population was spread out, with 29.4% under the age of 18, 7.9% from 18 to 24, 27.5% from 25 to 44, 26.0% from 45 to 64, and 9.2% who were 65 years of age or older. The median age was 36 years. For every 100 females, there were 115.1 males. For every 100 females age 18 and over, there were 116.3 males.

The median income for a household in the town was $38,077, and the median income for a family was $41,250. Males had a median income of $30,179 versus $21,250 for females. The per capita income for the town was $16,621. About 11.0% of families and 11.9% of the population were below the poverty line, including 14.0% of those under age 18 and 16.7% of those age 65 or over.

== History ==
Before the town of Benton was settled, Indians of the Pottawatomie and Winnebago tribes would pass through its modern boundaries. American Indians were also the first to discover the rich lead deposits located in the area, which is part of the Driftless Area, in what is now southwestern Wisconsin. As Europeans moved through the region, the American Indians of the area introduced them to the rich mineral deposits that would later draw them to the region en masse.

Though Europeans passed through and visited the region, threats from the Indians kept the area from being permanently settled until Andrew Murphy, along with his wife Catherine, five sons, a French voyageur named Francois and a servant named Peggy, established a homestead in the area that is now the town of Benton in 1827. Though no one settled for several years after the Murphy party, the relative safety after the conclusion of the Black Hawk War and the prosperity promised by the rich lead deposits brought large numbers of settlers.

Benton continued to grow and prosper, as the need for lead during the Civil War helped Benton recover from the Panic of 1857. Agriculture, too, fueled Benton's economy, and by the end of the 19th century Benton was home to three churches, four general stores, and many businesses.

Benton has long since moved from the extractive economy of mining to one based in agriculture and modern business.
