= Fayette (community), Wisconsin =

Fayette, Wisconsin
- Unincorporated community
- Location within Wisconsin Location within the United States
- Coordinates: 42°45′15″N 90°02′07″W
- Country: United States
- State: Wisconsin
- County: Lafayette
- Town: Fayette
- Elevation: 1,040 ft (320 m)
- Time zone: UTC-6 (Central (CST))
  - Summer (DST): UTC-5 (CDT)
- Area code: 608
- GNIS feature ID: 1564892

Fayette is an unincorporated community located in the town of Fayette, Lafayette County, Wisconsin, United States. Deriving its name from Lafayette County, the post office was established in August 1849 with Martin W. Anderson as the first postmaster.
