= James U. Goodman =

American Businessman and Politician

Member of the Wisconsin State Assembly
- In office 1921–1927

Personal details
- Born: May 11, 1872
- Died: June 7, 1953 (aged 81) St. Clare Hospital, Monroe, Wisconsin
- Party: Republican
- Occupation: Farmer; Auctioneer

James U. Goodman (May 11, 1872 – June 7, 1953) was an American farmer, teacher, businessman and politician.

Goodman was born in Jo Daviess County, Illinois and went to public schools. He taught in schools and was a farmer. Goodman was in the real estate business and was an auctioneer. Goodman was also President of the Argyle Equity Shipping Association. Goodman served as chairman, clerk, and supervisor for the town of Lamont, Lafayette County, Wisconsin. He also served as chairman of the Argyle Town Board in Lafayette County. Goodman served in the Wisconsin State Assembly from 1921 to 1927 and was a Republican. Goodman died at St. Clare Hospital in Monroe, Wisconsin after a short illness.
