= Eugene D. Parkinson =

American politician (1850–1936)

Member of the Wisconsin State Assembly
- In office 1911

Personal details
- Born: Eugene Delos Parkinson; February 21, 1850 Fayette, Wisconsin, U.S.
- Died: October 9, 1936 (aged 86) Fayette, Wisconsin, U.S.
- Party: Democratic
- Occupation: Politician, farmer

Eugene Delos Parkinson (February 21, 1850 – October 9, 1936) was an American farmer and politician.

Born in the town of Fayette, Lafayette County, Wisconsin, Parkinson went to the public and private school in Fayette, Wisconsin. Parkinson was a farmer. From 1903 to 1905, Parkinson served as sheriff for Lafayette County. He also served on the school board. Parkinson served on the Lafayette Town Board and was chairman of the town board. In 1911, Parkinson served in the Wisconsin State Assembly and was a Democrat. Parkinson died at his home in Fayette, Wisconsin after a short illness.
