= Yellowstone Lake State Park =

State Park in Lafayette County, Wisconsin

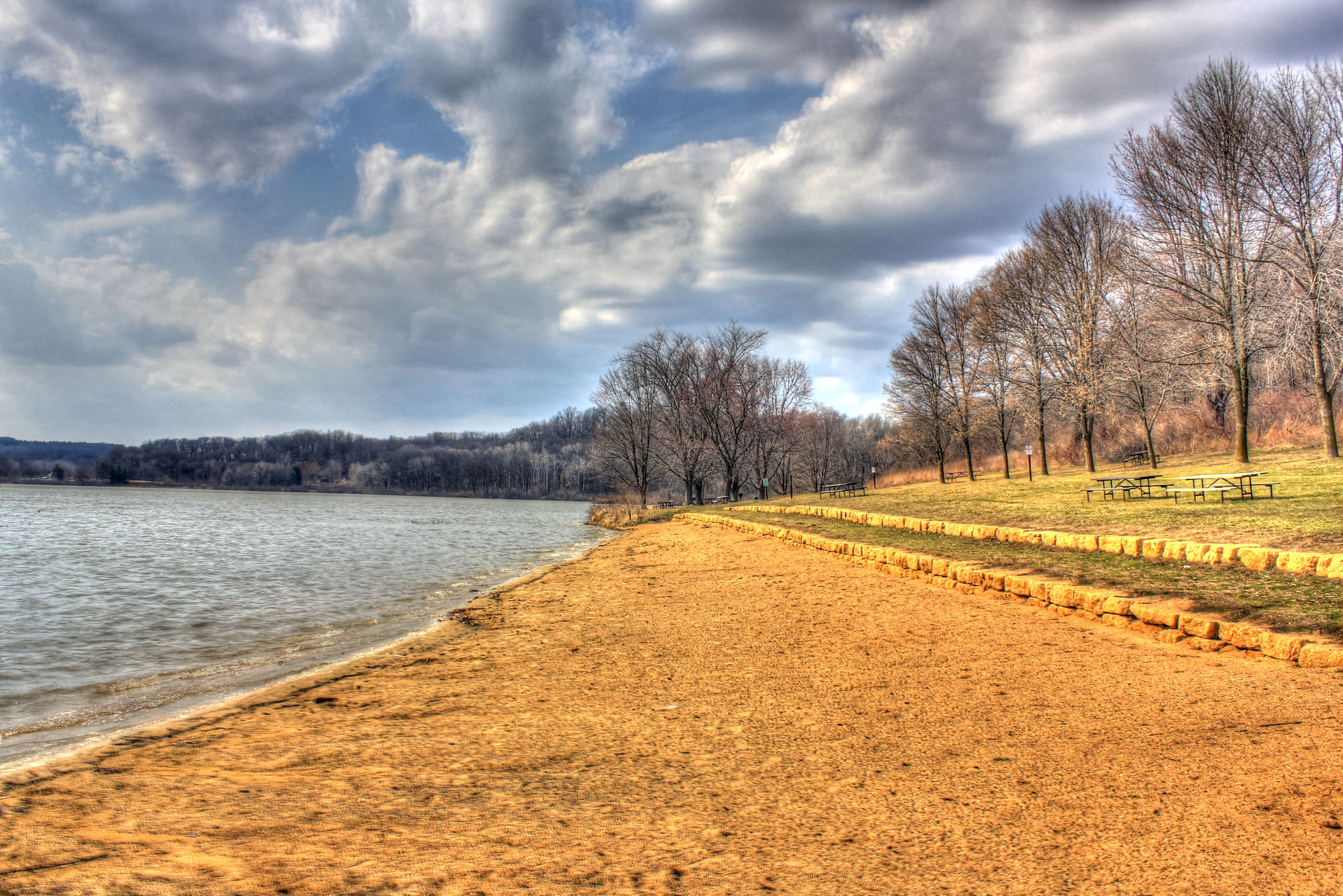
- Yellowstone Lake shoreline

- Location within Wisconsin Location within the United States
- Interactive map of Yellowstone Lake State Park
- Location: Lafayette County, Wisconsin, United States
- Coordinates: 42°45′48″N 89°58′40″W
- Area: 450 acres (180 ha)
- Established: 1970
- Administrator: Wisconsin Department of Natural Resources
- Website: Official website
- Wisconsin State Parks

Yellowstone Lake State Park is a state park in Lafayette County, Wisconsin, United States. The park sits on the shore of 453-acre (183 ha) Yellowstone Lake, a reservoir along the Yellowstone River. It is included in the 4,047-acre (1,638 ha) Yellowstone Wildlife Area.

The park has 128 campsites and 5 group sites. There is a swimming area with sand beach, picnic areas, playgrounds, and a boat launch. Fishing species include bluegill, largemouth bass, walleye, channel catfish, northern pike and muskellunge. The adjacent 4,000-acre wildlife area offers extensive horse trails and a shooting range.

The man-made lake is sustained by the Yellowstone River, a tributary of the Pecatonica River which enters on the northwest side, and the man-made dike built on the southeast side. The dam at the southern end of the dike is crossed by a narrow, steel catwalk, from which fishing is not allowed.
