= Meekers Grove, Wisconsin =

- Unincorporated community
- Location within Wisconsin Location within the United States
- Coordinates: 42°38′44″N 90°22′10″W
- Country: United States
- State: Wisconsin
- County: Lafayette
- Town: Elk Grove
- Elevation: 971 ft (296 m)
- Time zone: UTC-6 (Central (CST))
  - Summer (DST): UTC-5 (CDT)
- Area code: 608
- GNIS feature ID: 1577722

Meekers Grove is an unincorporated community located in the town of Elk Grove, Lafayette County, Wisconsin, United States. It consists of a grouping of two houses, a One-room school that caught fire and was demolished in 2000, and nearby farms.

== Attractions ==
Red's Supper Club stands at the intersection of County H and State Road 81, approximately 1 mile north of Meeker's Grove.

St. Peter's Catholic Church stands at 26203 St. Peters Road.

There is an abandoned rock quarry on Red School Road near the Madden Branch of the Galena River (Illinois), approximately 1 mile east of Meeker's Grove.

== History ==
There used to be a One-room school located at the address 10487 County H (at the intersection of County H and Red School Road) but it was struck by lightning and caught fire in 2000 and was demolished shortly thereafter. You can still see playground equipment and a small parking lot at the location today. This school, painted red, was the namesake for Red School Road.
