= Elk Grove, Wisconsin =

- Town
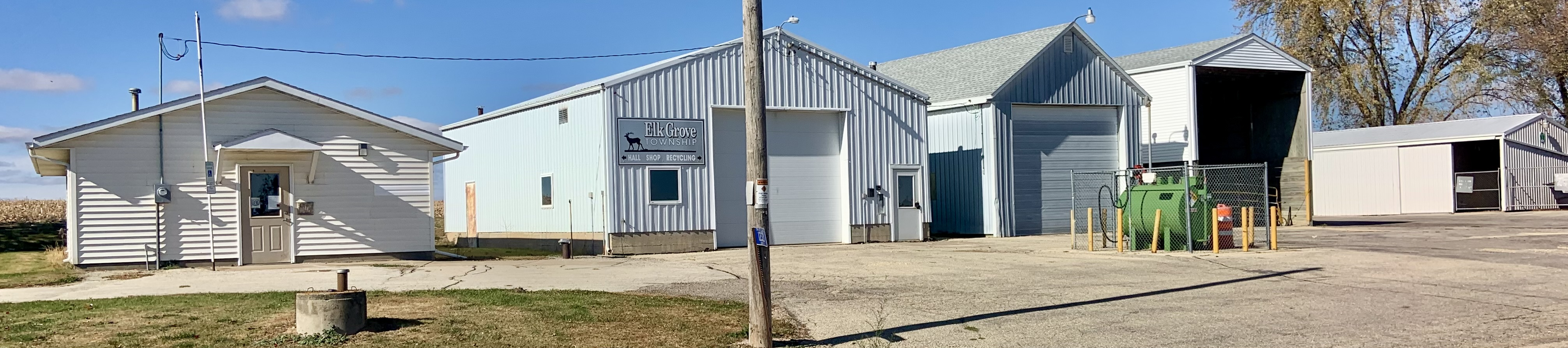
- Town hall

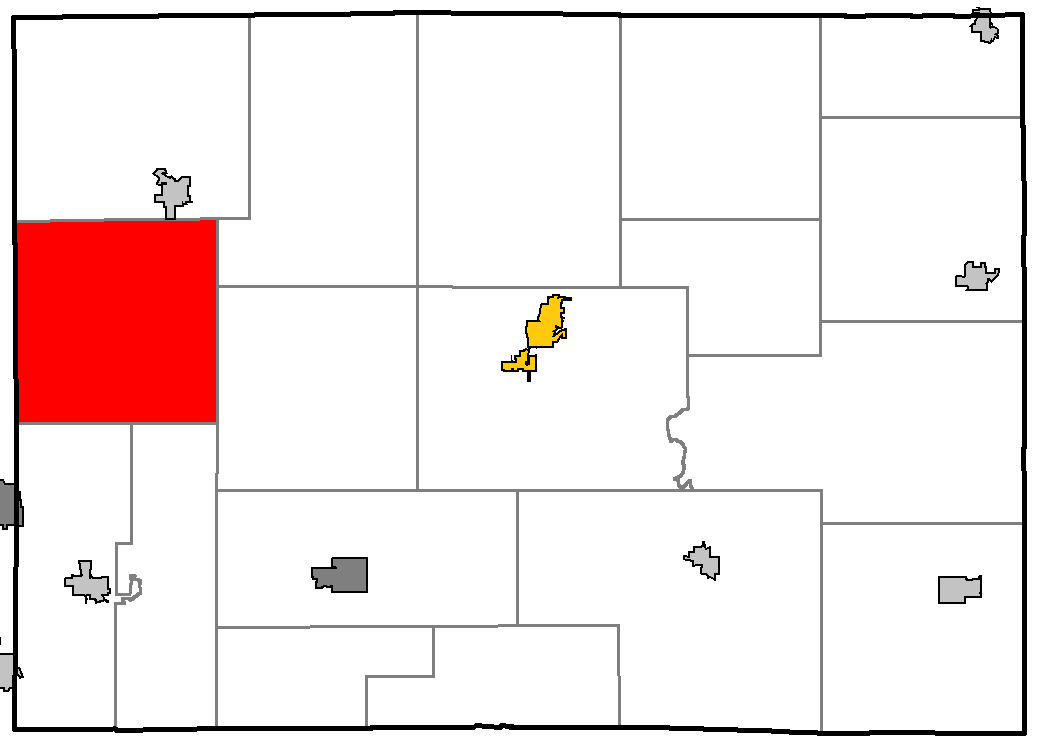
- Location of Elk Grove, within Lafayette County, Wisconsin

- Location of Lafayette County, Wisconsin
- Coordinates: 42°40′12″N 90°22′4″W
- Country: United States
- State: Wisconsin
- County: Lafayette

Area
  - Total: 36.3 sq mi (94.0 km^{2})
  - Land: 36.3 sq mi (94.0 km^{2})
  - Water: 0 sq mi (0.0 km^{2})
- Elevation: 942 ft (287 m)

Population (2020)
  - Total: 566
  - Density: 15.6/sq mi (6.02/km^{2})
- Time zone: UTC-6 (Central (CST))
  - Summer (DST): UTC-5 (CDT)
- ZIP Codes: 53510 (Belmont); 53807 (Cuba City); 53818 (Platteville)
- Area code: 608
- FIPS code: 55-23262
- GNIS feature ID: 1583148

Elk Grove is a town in Lafayette County, Wisconsin, United States. The population was 566 at the 2020 census, up from 551 at the 2010 census. The unincorporated communities of Ipswich, Meekers Grove and Elk Grove, where Wisconsin State Representative James V. Holland (1835-1916) was born, are located in the town.

== Geography ==
Elk Grove is in western Lafayette County and is bordered to the west by Grant County. According to the United States Census Bureau, the town has a total area of 36.3 square miles (94.0 km^{2}), all land. It is drained by the Galena River and its tributaries.

== Demographics ==
Historical population
Census	Pop.	Note	%±
2000	463		—
2010	551		19.0%
2020	566		2.7%

As of the census of 2000, 463 people, 145 households, and 112 families reside in the town. The population density was 12.8 people per square mile (4.9/km^{2}). There were 158 housing units at an average density of 4.4 per square mile (1.7/km^{2}). The racial makeup of the town was 97.41% White, 0.22% Native American and 2.38% Asian. Hispanic or Latino of any race were 0.22% of the population.

There were 145 households, out of which 43.4% had children under the age of 18 living with them, 62.8% were married couples living together, 6.2% had a female householder with no husband present, and 22.1% were non-families. 19.3% of all households were made up of individuals, and 7.6% had someone living alone who was 65 years of age or older. The average household size was 3.19 and the average family size was 3.72.

In the town, the population was spread out, with 35.9% under the age of 18, 9.1% from 18 to 24, 27.9% from 25 to 44, 19.0% from 45 to 64, and 8.2% who were 65 years of age or older. The median age was 30 years. For every 100 females, there were 121.5 males. For every 100 females age 18 and over, there were 130.2 males.

The median income for a household in the town was $36,607, and the median income for a family was $43,750. Males had a median income of $21,477 versus $20,000 for females. The per capita income for the town was $13,519. About 12.1% of families and 19.8% of the population were below the poverty line, including 31.3% of those under age 18 and 9.1% of those age 65 or over.
