= Peter Parkinson =

American politician (1813–1895)

Member of the Wisconsin State Assembly
- In office 1854

Personal details
- Born: January 22, 1813 Carter County, Tennessee, U.S.
- Died: May 30, 1895 (aged 82) Fayette, Wisconsin, U.S.
- Party: Democratic
- Children: Therese A. Jenkins
- Parent: Daniel Morgan Parkinson (father)
- Occupation: Politician

Military service
- Allegiance: United States
- Branch/service: United States Army
- Rank: Officer
- Unit: 2nd Stryker Cavalry Regiment
- Battles/wars: Black Hawk War

Peter Parkinson (January 22, 1813 in Carter County, Tennessee – May 30, 1895 in Fayette, Wisconsin) was an American politician who served as a member of the Wisconsin State Assembly.

His father, Daniel Morgan Parkinson, was also a member of the Assembly. Parkinson served in the Black Hawk War under Henry Dodge and later as an officer with the 2nd Stryker Cavalry Regiment.

== Political career ==
Parkinson was a member of the Assembly in 1854. He was a Democrat.
