= Lafayette County Courthouse (Wisconsin) =

- U.S. National Register of Historic Places
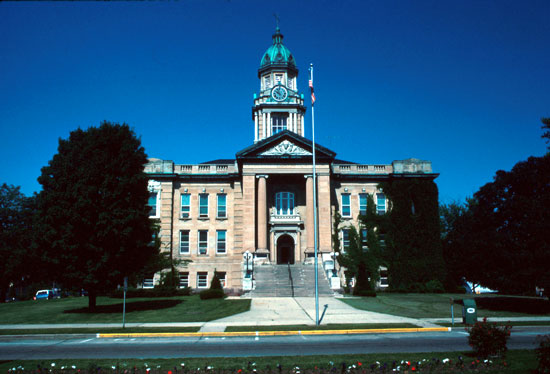
- Lafayette County Courthouse

- Location within Wisconsin Location within the United States
- Interactive map showing the location for Lafayette County Courthouse
- Location: 626 Main St. Darlington, Wisconsin
- Coordinates: 42.68245°N 90.11834°W
- Built: 1905-1907
- Architect: Kinney & Detweiler
- Architectural style: Classical Revival
- NRHP reference No.: 78000114
- Added to NRHP: December 22, 1978

The Lafayette County Courthouse is a Neoclassical building constructed in Darlington, Wisconsin in 1905. It was added to the National Register of Historic Places in 1978.

An earlier county courthouse stood on the southeast corner of the same lot since 1861 - a three-story stone building. By 1900 more space was needed. Matt Murphy of Benton, Wisconsin was the remaining trustee of a fund to care for widows and others affected by the Civil War. The fund was not needed after the federal government took responsibility for those affected by the war, and after exploring other options, Murphy dedicated it to help build the new 1905 courthouse. Along with the Civil War survivors' fund, Murphy gave 70% of his own estate to the county for a courthouse. Ultimately, the cost of building the courthouse was more than $136,000. It is the only county courthouse in the United States to be fully funded by one person.

The building was designed in Neoclassical style by Menno S. Detweiler and Frank W. Kinney of Minneapolis. The main block of the building is three stories tall, clad in buff limestone, with rusticated quoins. The main entrance protrudes as a distyle in antis Greek temple form, with a relief sculpture of Matt Murphy in the pediment. The roof is hipped. From the center rises the cupola. The first stage has Ionic columns between windows topped with clock faces. The second stage of the cupola is octagonal, topped with copper.

Inside, light from a skylight in the cupola illuminates the center of the building, with marble wainscoting, hexagonal tiles, arches, and murals depicting Justice, Equality, Courage and Liberty.

Scenes from the 2009 film Public Enemies were filmed at the courthouse.
