= East Branch Pecatonica River =

River in Wisconsin, United States

Coordinates: 42°35′07″N 89°50′32″W

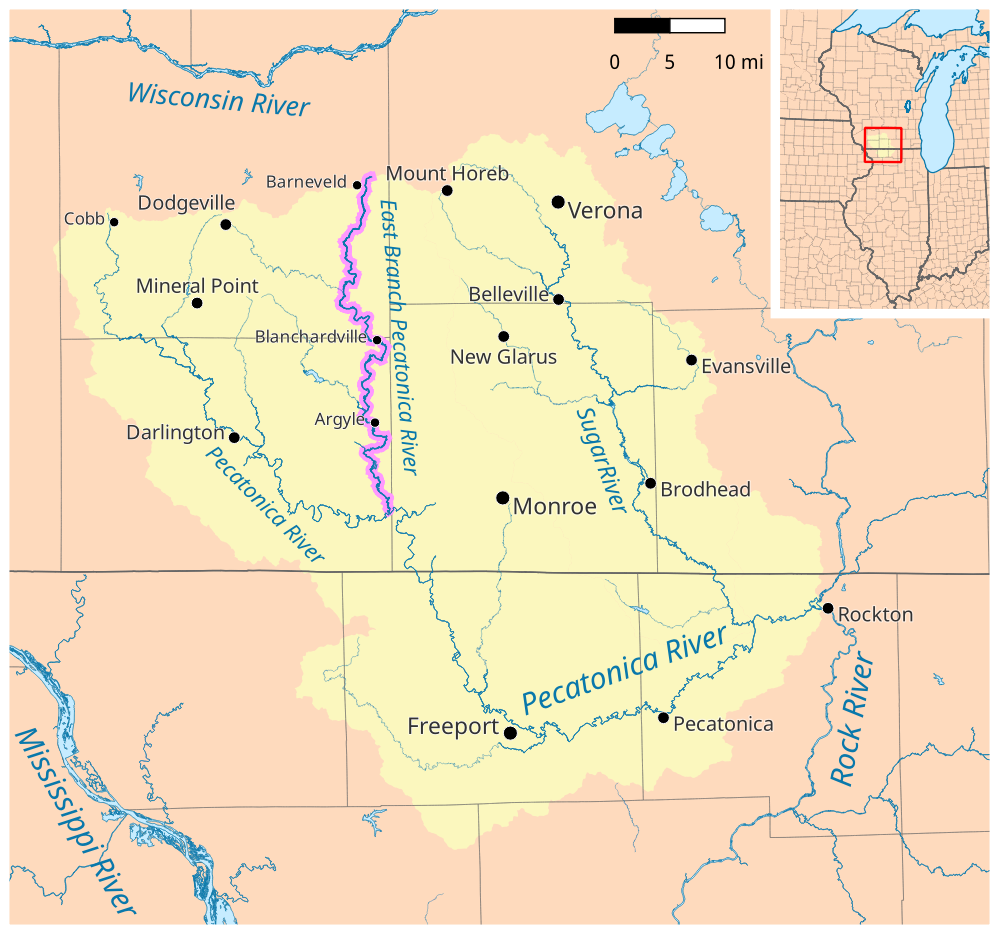
Location of the East Branch Pecatonica River in the Pecatonica River watershed

The East Branch Pecatonica River is a tributary of the Pecatonica River, approximately 62.5 miles (100.6 km) long, in southwest Wisconsin in the United States.

It rises in the hills of eastern Iowa County, approximately 2 miles (3 km) north of Barneveld and approximately 25 miles (40 km) west of Madison. It flows south past Barneveld, Blanchardville, and Argyle, and joins the Pecatonica in southeast Lafayette County, approximately 5 miles (8 km) north of the state line with Illinois.

== See also ==
- List of Wisconsin rivers
