= Fort Defiance (Wisconsin) =

Coordinates: 42°47.783′N 90°07.773′W

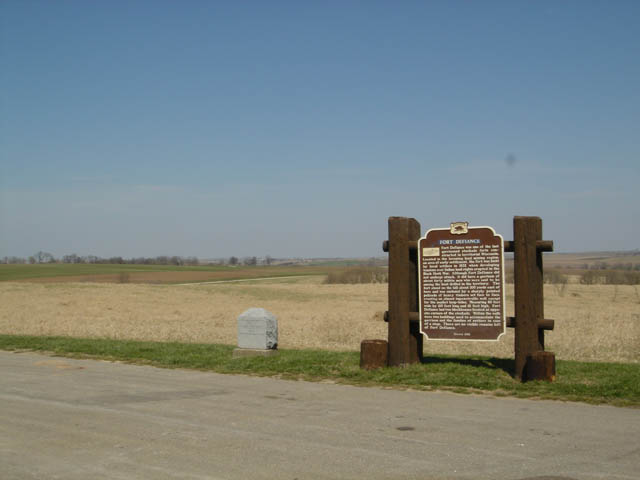

Fort Defiance was one of the last garrisoned stockade forts constructed in territorial Wisconsin. It was located approximately five miles southeast of Mineral Point, Wisconsin. It was located in the booming lead mining region in an area of early settlement. The fort was built by local settlers in 1832 when developing tensions over Native American land rights erupted into the Black Hawk War. Although Fort Defiance did not experience attack, it did have a garrison of about 40 militia men who were said to be among the best drilled in the territory. Fort Defiance had two blockhouses located at opposite corners of the stockade. Within the walls were two buildings used to accommodate the garrison and the families of settlers in case of a siege. There are no visible remains.

It was commanded by Captain Robert C. Hoard, a smelter from Mineral Point who would later be elected to the legislatures of the Michigan Territory and Wisconsin Territory.
