= Willow Springs, Wisconsin =

- Town
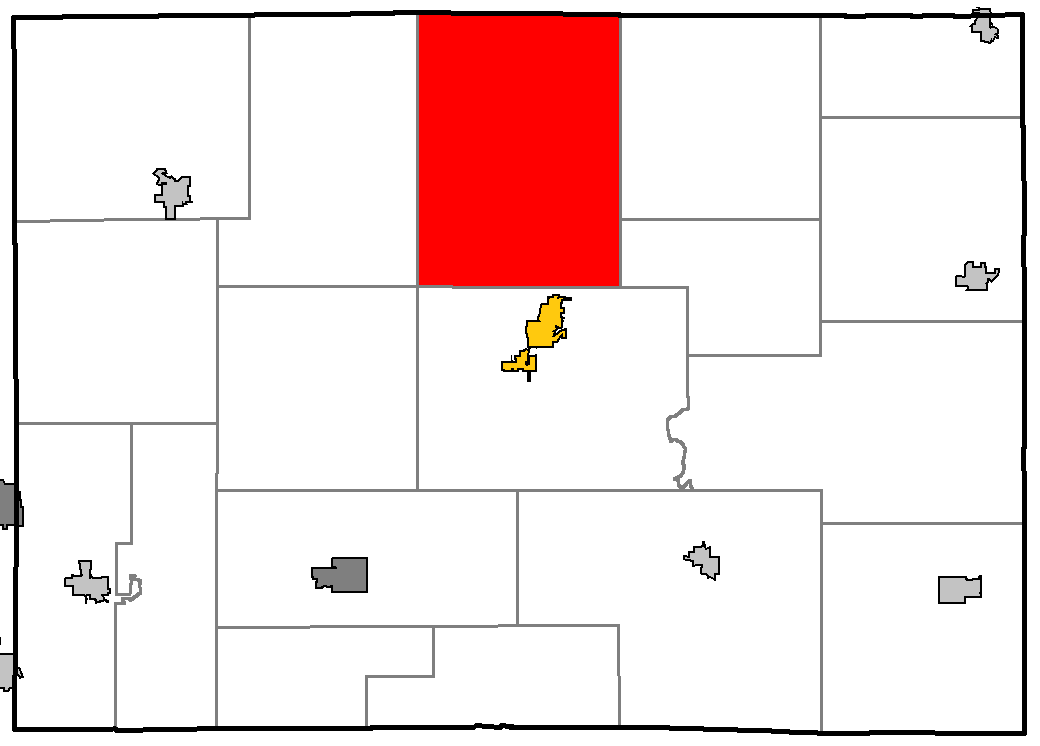
- Location of Willow Springs, within Lafayette County, Wisconsin

- Location of Lafayette County, Wisconsin
- Coordinates: 42°45′7″N 90°7′49″W
- Country: United States
- State: Wisconsin
- County: Lafayette

Area
  - Total: 48.2 sq mi (124.9 km^{2})
  - Land: 48.2 sq mi (124.9 km^{2})
  - Water: 0 sq mi (0.0 km^{2})
- Elevation: 909 ft (277 m)

Population (2020)
  - Total: 789
  - Density: 16.4/sq mi (6.32/km^{2})
- Time zone: UTC-6 (Central (CST))
  - Summer (DST): UTC-5 (CDT)
- ZIP Codes: 53565 (Mineral Point); 53530 (Darlington)
- Area code: 608
- FIPS code: 55-87275
- GNIS feature ID: 1584442

Willow Springs is a town in Lafayette County, Wisconsin, United States. The population was 789 at the 2020 census, up from 758 at the 2010 census. The unincorporated community of Calamine is located in the town.

== Geography ==
Willow Springs is in northern Lafayette County, bordered by Iowa County to the north. According to the United States Census Bureau, the town has a total area of 48.2 square miles (124.9 km^{2}), all land. It is drained by two southward-flowing waterways: the Pecatonica River in the west, and Otter Creek, its tributary, in the east.

== Demographics ==
Historical population
Census	Pop.	Note	%±
2000	632		—
2010	758		19.9%
2020	789		4.1%

As of the census of 2000, there were 632 people, 230 households, and 178 families residing in the town. The population density was 13.1 people per square mile (5.1/km^{2}). There were 237 housing units at an average density of 4.9 per square mile (1.9/km^{2}). The racial makeup of the town was 96.68% White, 0.16% (1 resident) African American, 0.32% (2 residents) Asian, 1.74% from other races, and 1.11% from two or more races. Hispanic or Latino of any race were 2.37% of the population.

There were 230 households, out of which 35.7% had children under the age of 18 living with them, 69.1% were married couples living together, 4.8% had a female householder with no husband present, and 22.2% were non-families. 20.4% of all households were made up of individuals, and 9.1% had someone living alone who was 65 years of age or older. The average household size was 2.75 and the average family size was 3.18.

In the town, the population was spread out, with 25.6% under the age of 18, 10.8% from 18 to 24, 24.8% from 25 to 44, 28.0% from 45 to 64, and 10.8% who were 65 years of age or older. The median age was 37 years. For every 100 females, there were 110.0 males. For every 100 females age 18 and over, there were 117.6 males.

The median income for a household in the town was $41,094, and the median income for a family was $46,500. Males had a median income of $30,000 versus $24,861 for females. The per capita income for the town was $16,458. About 10.4% of families and 12.1% of the population were below the poverty line, including 19.8% of those under age 18 and 6.9% of those age 65 or over.

== Notable people ==
- James G. Monahan, politician and editor; born in the town
- Danverse Neff, merchant and politician, chaired the board of Willow Springs
- John Sheldon, farmer, businessman, and politician; born in the town
