= Kendall, Lafayette County, Wisconsin =

Town in Wisconsin, United States

Kendall, Wisconsin
- Town
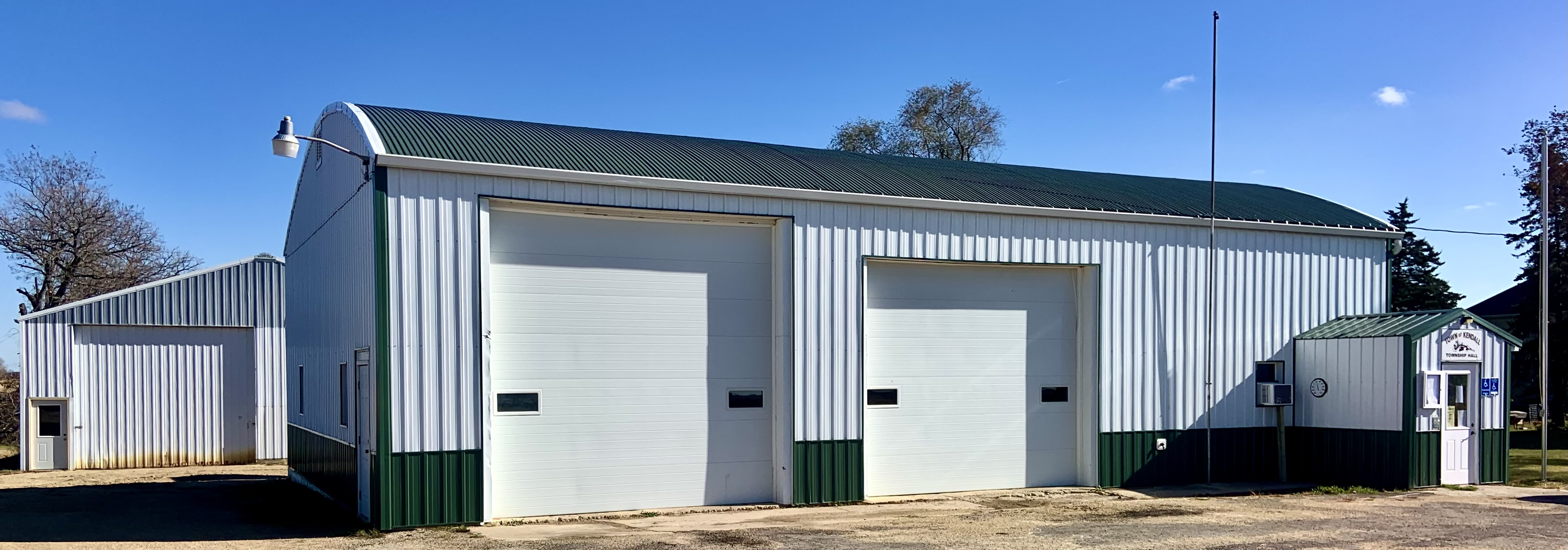
- Town hall

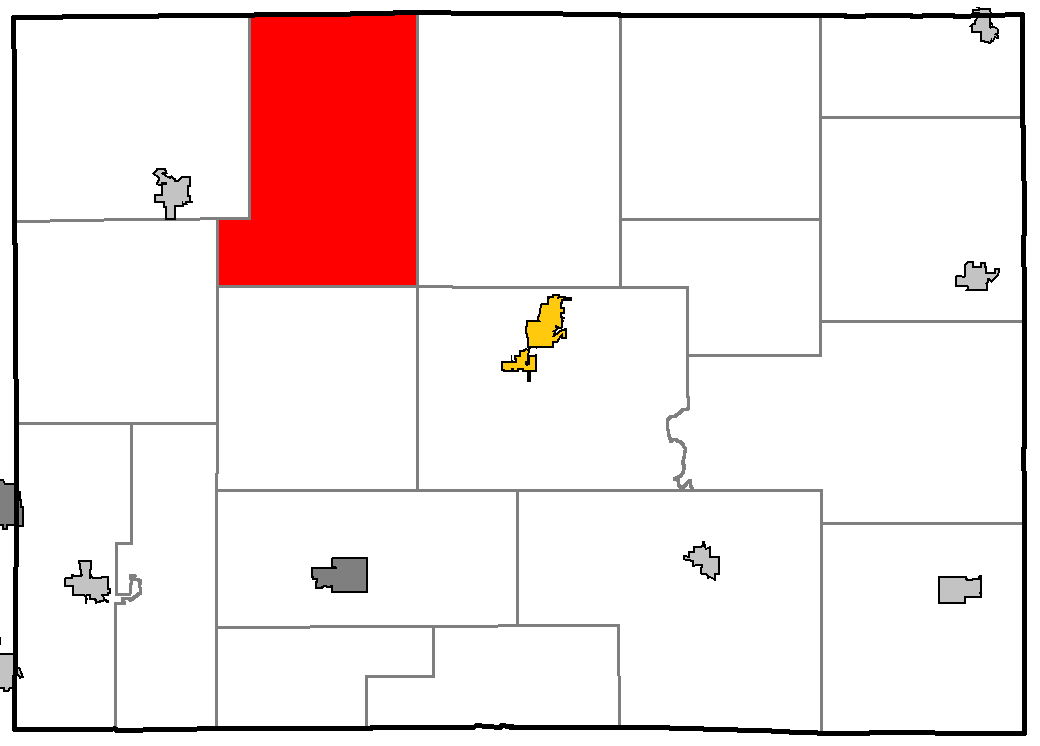
- Location of Kendall, in Lafayette County, Wisconsin

- Location of Lafayette County, Wisconsin
- Coordinates: 42°45′10″N 90°14′30″W
- Country: United States
- State: Wisconsin
- County: Lafayette

Area
  - Total: 42.54 sq mi (110.17 km^{2})
  - Land: 42.52 sq mi (110.13 km^{2})
  - Water: 0.015 sq mi (0.04 km^{2})
- Elevation: 875 ft (267 m)

Population (2020)
  - Total: 402
  - Density: 9.45/sq mi (3.65/km^{2})
- Time zone: UTC-6 (CST)
  - Summer (DST): UTC-5 (CDT)
- ZIP Codes: 53565 (Mineral Point); 53510 (Belmont); 53530 (Darlington)
- Area code: 608
- FIPS code: 55-065-39125
- GNIS feature ID: 1583468

Kendall is a town in Lafayette County, Wisconsin, United States. As of the 2020 census, the population was 402, up from 454 at the 2010 census. The unincorporated communities of Slateford and Truman are located in the town.

== Geography ==
Kendall is in northwestern Lafayette County and is bordered to the north by Iowa County. According to the United States Census Bureau, the town has a total area of 42.5 square miles (110.2 km^{2}), of which 0.02 square miles (0.04 km^{2}), or 0.03%, are water. The Pecatonica River crosses the northeastern part of the town, picking up several tributaries which drain the town, including the Mineral Point Branch, Cottage Inn Branch, Bonner Branch, and Wood Branch.

== Demographics ==
At the 2000 census there were 320 people, 110 households, and 88 families in the town. The population density was 7.5 people per square mile (2.9/km^{2}). There were 118 housing units at an average density of 2.8 per square mile (1.1/km^{2}). The racial makeup of the town was 98.12% White, 0.31% from other races, and 1.56% from two or more races. Hispanic or Latino of any race were 2.50%.

Of the 110 households 38.2% had children under the age of 18 living with them, 67.3% were married couples living together, 6.4% had a female householder with no husband present, and 19.1% were non-families. 13.6% of households were one person and 6.4% were one person aged 65 or older. The average household size was 2.91 and the average family size was 3.24.

The age distribution was 29.7% under the age of 18, 11.3% from 18 to 24, 23.8% from 25 to 44, 25.0% from 45 to 64, and 10.3% 65 or older. The median age was 36 years. For every 100 females, there were 90.5 males. For every 100 females age 18 and over, there were 102.7 males.

The median household income was $40,714 and the median family income was $41,750. Males had a median income of $25,833 versus $28,125 for females. The per capita income for the town was $15,466. None of the families and 1.3% of the population were living below the poverty line, including no under eighteens and none of those over 64.
