= Argyle (village), Wisconsin =

Argyle, Wisconsin
- Village
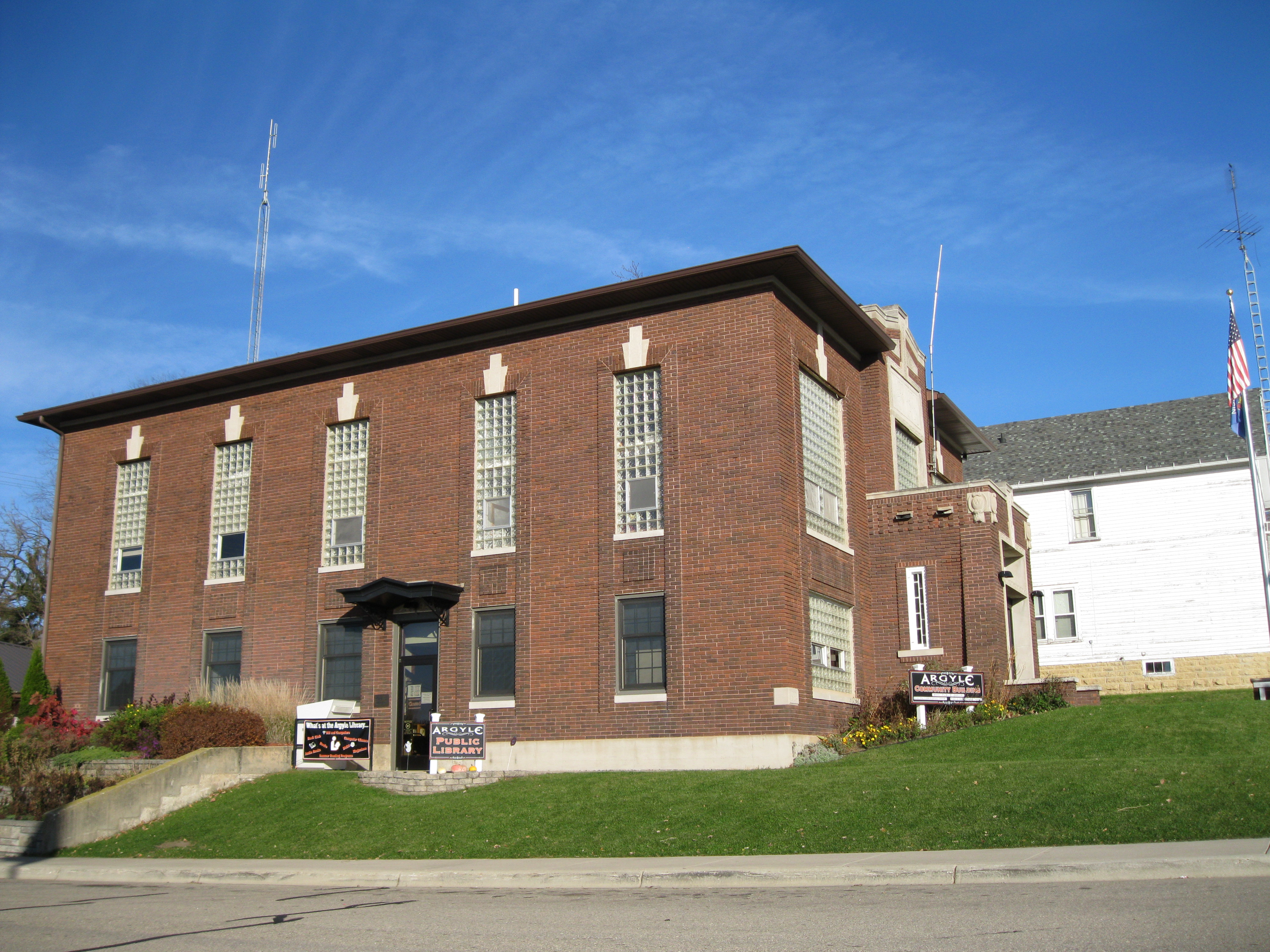
- Argyle Community Building and Public Library

- Location of Argyle in Lafayette County, Wisconsin.
- Coordinates: 42°44′13″N 89°54′5″W
- Country: United States
- State: Wisconsin
- County: Lafayette

Area
  - Total: 0.63 sq mi (1.63 km^{2})
  - Land: 0.63 sq mi (1.63 km^{2})
  - Water: 0 sq mi (0.00 km^{2})
- Elevation: 807 ft (246 m)

Population (2020)
  - Total: 783
  - Density: 1,240/sq mi (480/km^{2})
- Time zone: UTC-6 (Central (CST))
  - Summer (DST): UTC-5 (CDT)
- Area code: 608
- FIPS code: 55-02675
- GNIS feature ID: 1582710
- Website: www.argylewi.gov

Argyle is a village in Lafayette County, Wisconsin, United States. The population was 783 at the 2020 census, down from 857 at the 2010 census. The village is surrounded by the Town of Argyle.

== History ==
The village began at a convenient ford for crossing the East Branch Pecatonica River. The first settler named it after the Duke of Argyll, who had sponsored his coming to the United States. That came after an application for a post office under the name of Hazel Green was denied on the grounds that there already was a Hazel Green in Wisconsin. The village's original settlers were predominantly from New England, Norway and Ireland, which is reflected in the village's three oldest churches, Argyle Methodist Church (UMC), Argyle Lutheran Church (ELCA), and St. Joseph's Catholic Church.

== Geography ==
Argyle is located at 42°42′07″N 89°51′59″W (42.701827, -89.866408).

According to the United States Census Bureau, the village has a total area of 0.62 square miles (1.61 km^{2}), all land. The East Branch Pecatonica River flows through this area.

== Demographics ==
Historical population
Census	Pop.	Note	%±
1880	322		—
1890	411		27.6%
1910	603		—
1920	701		16.3%
1930	692		−1.3%
1940	735		6.2%
1950	702		−4.5%
1960	786		12.0%
1970	673		−14.4%
1980	720		7.0%
1990	798		10.8%
2000	823		3.1%
2010	857		4.1%
2020	783		−8.6%
U.S. Decennial Census

=== 2010 census ===
As of the census of 2010, there were 857 people, 366 households, and 223 families residing in the village. The population density was 1,382.3 inhabitants per square mile (533.7/km^{2}). There were 393 housing units at an average density of 633.9 per square mile (244.8/km^{2}). The racial makeup of the village was 99.1% White, 0.1% African American, 0.4% Native American, 0.1% from other races, and 0.4% from two or more races. Hispanic or Latino of any race were 2.0% of the population.

There were 366 households, of which 31.7% had children under the age of 18 living with them, 46.2% were married couples living together, 9.0% had a female householder with no husband present, 5.7% had a male householder with no wife present, and 39.1% were non-families. 33.3% of all households were made up of individuals, and 15.1% had someone living alone who was 65 years of age or older. The average household size was 2.34 and the average family size was 3.00.

The median age in the village was 39.6 years. 24.9% of residents were under the age of 18; 8.9% were between the ages of 18 and 24; 23.6% were from 25 to 44; 25.5% were from 45 to 64; and 17.3% were 65 years of age or older. The gender makeup of the village was 51.8% male and 48.2% female.

=== 2000 census ===
As of the census of 2000, there were 823 people, 343 households, and 214 families residing in the village. The population density was 1,361.0 people per square mile (529.6/km^{2}). There were 365 housing units at an average density of 603.6 per square mile (234.9/km^{2}). The racial makeup of the village was 99.88% White and 0.12% Black or African American. 0.73% of the population were Hispanic or Latino of any race.

There were 343 households, out of which 30.0% had children under the age of 18 living with them, 49.0% were married couples living together, 9.3% had a female householder with no husband present, and 37.6% were non-families. 31.2% of all households were made up of individuals, and 16.9% had someone living alone who was 65 years of age or older. The average household size was 2.40 and the average family size was 3.01.

In the village, the population was spread out, with 25.8% under the age of 18, 6.2% from 18 to 24, 28.7% from 25 to 44, 19.7% from 45 to 64, and 19.7% who were 65 years of age or older. The median age was 39 years. For every 100 females, there were 103.2 males. For every 100 females age 18 and over, there were 99.0 males.

The median income for a household in the village was $36,103, and the median income for a family was $44,063. Males had a median income of $28,029 versus $22,434 for females. The per capita income for the village was $15,974. About 6.7% of families and 8.7% of the population were below the poverty line, including 9.5% of those under age 18 and 10.1% of those age 65 or over.

== Education ==
The elementary school, middle school, and high school in Argyle are in one building located in the northwest part of the village. Enrollment in the elementary school is about 120 students, with about 180 students in the middle and high school.

== Historic landmarks ==
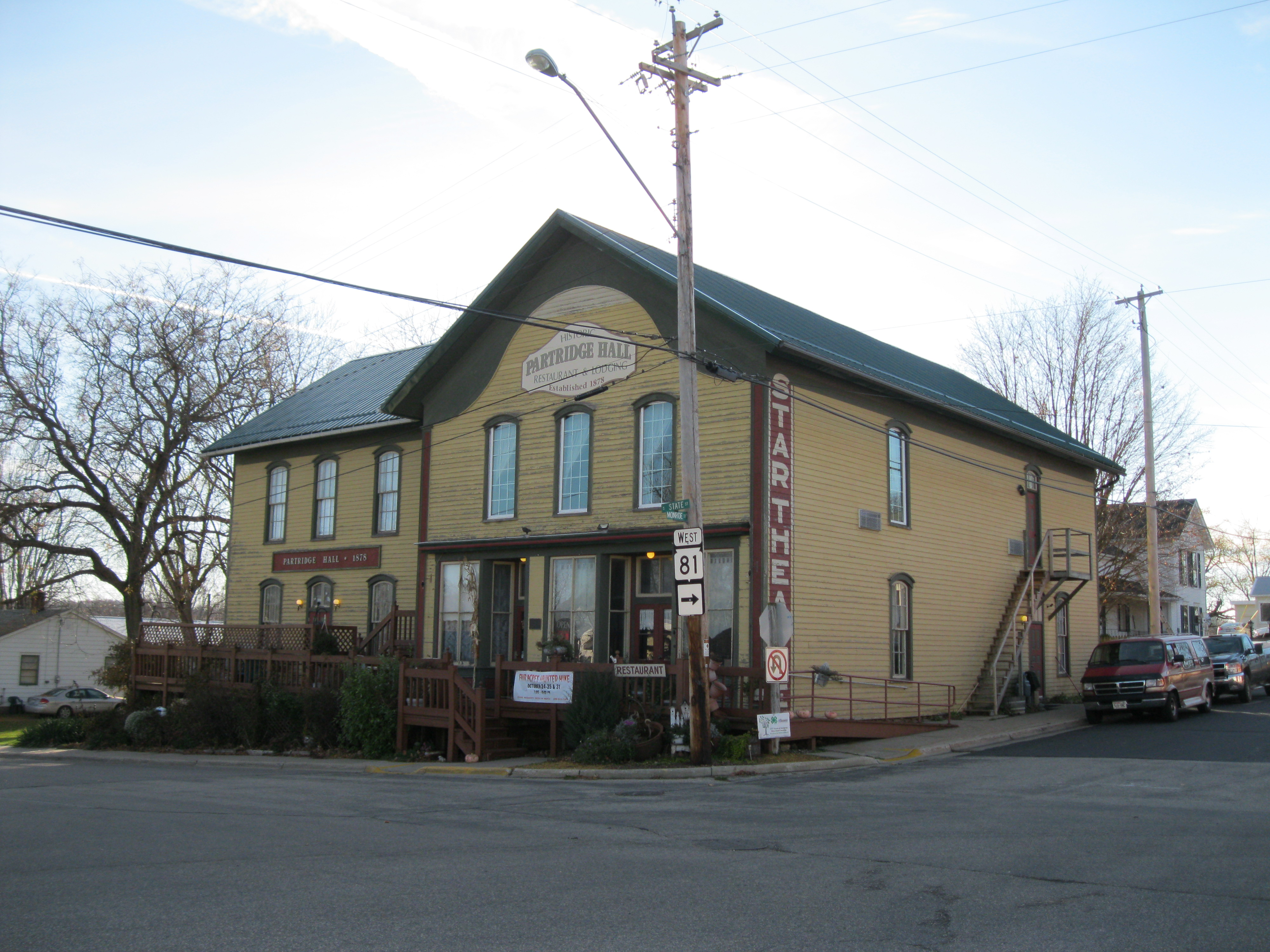
Star Theatre

The Star Theatre in Argyle is on the National Register of Historic Places.

== Notable people ==
- Byron Andrews (1852-1910), journalist for Chicago Inter-Ocean newspaper, part owner of National Tribune Publishing Co. in Washington, D.C., Private corresponding secretary to U.S. Pres. Ulysses S. Grant during Industrial Excursions to Mexico and Cuba
- Robert La Follette, Sr. (1855-1925), 20th Governor of Wisconsin, United States Senator, and candidate for President of the United States (Progressive Party) lived in Argyle.
- Margaret R. Fox (1916-2006), American electronics engineer and computer scientist
- James U. Goodman (1872-1953), Wisconsin State Representative, lived in Argyle.
- Charles Irwin Lambert (1877-1954), physicist and educator at Columbia University, was born in Argyle.
- Martin O. Monson (1885-1969), Wisconsin State Representative, was born in Argyle.
- S. Dell Penniston (1870-1961), Wisconsin State Representative, was born in Argyle.
