= Lafayette County, Wisconsin =

County in Wisconsin, United States

- County
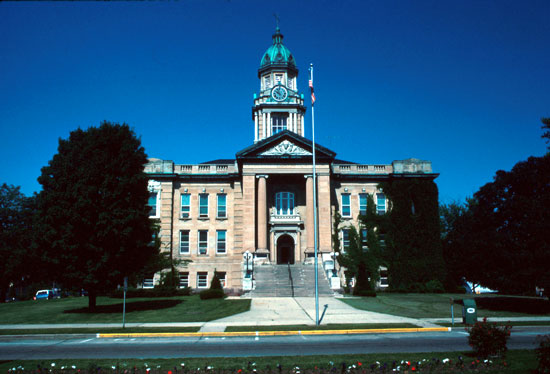
- Lafayette County Courthouse in 1982

- Location within the U.S. state of Wisconsin
- Coordinates: 42°40′N 90°08′W
- Country: United States
- State: Wisconsin
- Founded: 1846
- Named for: Marquis de Lafayette
- Seat: Darlington
- Largest city: Darlington

Area
  - Total: 635 sq mi (1,640 km^{2})
  - Land: 634 sq mi (1,640 km^{2})
  - Water: 1.0 sq mi (2.6 km^{2}) 0.2%

Population (2020)
  - Total: 16,611
  - Estimate (2025): 17,478 ▲
  - Density: 27.6/sq mi (10.7/km^{2})
- Time zone: UTC−6 (Central)
  - Summer (DST): UTC−5 (CDT)
- Congressional district: 2nd
- Website: www.lafayettecountywi.org

Lafayette County, sometimes spelled La Fayette County, is a county located in the U.S. state of Wisconsin. It was part of the Wisconsin Territory at the time of its founding. As of the 2020 census, the population was 16,611. Its county seat is Darlington. The county was named in honor of the Marquis de Lafayette, the French general who rendered assistance to the Continental Army in the American Revolutionary War. The county is considered a high-farming concentration county by the U.S. Department of Agriculture, meaning at least 20 percent of its earnings came from agriculture.

The courthouse scenes from the 2009 film Public Enemies were filmed at the Lafayette County Courthouse in Darlington.

== Geography ==
According to the U.S. Census Bureau, the county has a total area of 635 square miles (1,640 km^{2}), of which 634 square miles (1,640 km^{2}) is land and 1.0 square mile (2.6 km^{2}) (0.2%) is water.

=== Major highways ===
- U.S. Highway 151
- Highway 11 (Wisconsin)
- Highway 23 (Wisconsin)
- Highway 78 (Wisconsin)
- Highway 81 (Wisconsin)
- Highway 126 (Wisconsin)

=== Adjacent counties ===
- Grant County – west
- Iowa County – north
- Green County – east
- Stephenson County, Illinois – southeast
- Jo Daviess County, Illinois – south

== Demographics ==
Historical population
Census	Pop.	Note	%±
1850	11,531		—
1860	18,134		57.3%
1870	22,659		25.0%
1880	21,279		−6.1%
1890	20,265		−4.8%
1900	20,959		3.4%
1910	20,075		−4.2%
1920	20,002		−0.4%
1930	18,649		−6.8%
1940	18,695		0.2%
1950	18,137		−3.0%
1960	18,142		0.0%
1970	17,456		−3.8%
1980	17,412		−0.3%
1990	16,076		−7.7%
2000	16,137		0.4%
2010	16,836		4.3%
2020	16,611		−1.3%
2025 (est.)	17,478	▲	5.2%

=== Racial and ethnic composition ===
Lafayette County, Wisconsin – Racial and ethnic composition Note: the US Census treats Hispanic/Latino as an ethnic category. This table excludes Latinos from the racial categories and assigns them to a separate category. Hispanics/Latinos may be of any race.
Race / ethnicity (NH = Non-Hispanic)	Pop 1980	Pop 1990	Pop 2000	Pop 2010	Pop 2020	% 1980	% 1990	% 2000	% 2010	% 2020
White alone (NH)	17,321	15,994	15,921	16,102	15,081	99.48%	99.49%	98.66%	95.64%	90.79%
Black or African American alone (NH)	1	10	17	39	27	0.01%	0.06%	0.11%	0.23%	0.16%
Native American or Alaska Native alone (NH)	12	19	18	36	20	0.07%	0.12%	0.11%	0.21%	0.12%
Asian alone (NH)	12	15	36	57	36	0.07%	0.09%	0.22%	0.34%	0.22%
Native Hawaiian or Pacific Islander alone (NH)	x	x	6	0	4	x	x	0.04%	0.00%	0.02%
Other race alone (NH)	14	1	0	0	19	0.08%	0.01%	0.00%	0.00%	0.11%
Mixed race or Multiracial (NH)	x	x	47	80	335	x	x	0.29%	0.48%	2.02%
Hispanic or Latino (any race)	52	37	92	522	1,089	0.30%	0.23%	0.57%	3.10%	6.56%
Total	17,412	16,076	16,137	16,836	16,611	100.00%	100.00%	100.00%	100.00%	100.00%

=== 2020 census ===
As of the 2020 census, the population was 16,611. The population density was 26.2 people per square mile (10.1 people/km^{2}). There were 7,156 housing units at an average density of 11.3 units per square mile (4.4 units/km^{2}). <0.1% of residents lived in urban areas, while 100.0% lived in rural areas.

The racial makeup of the county was 91.7% White, 0.2% Black or African American, 0.3% American Indian and Alaska Native, 0.2% Asian, <0.1% Native Hawaiian and Pacific Islander, 3.7% from some other race, and 3.9% from two or more races. Hispanic or Latino residents of any race comprised 6.6% of the population.

The median age was 40.9 years, 24.8% of residents were under the age of 18, and 18.7% of residents were 65 years of age or older. For every 100 females there were 103.1 males, and for every 100 females age 18 and over there were 103.5 males age 18 and over.

There were 6,618 households, of which 28.8% had children under the age of 18 living in them. Of all households, 53.4% were married-couple households, 19.5% were households with a male householder and no spouse or partner present, and 19.8% were households with a female householder and no spouse or partner present. About 27.2% of all households were made up of individuals and 12.3% had someone living alone who was 65 years of age or older.

Of those housing units, 7.5% were vacant. Among occupied housing units, 77.3% were owner-occupied and 22.7% were renter-occupied. The homeowner vacancy rate was 0.8% and the rental vacancy rate was 6.1%.

=== 2000 census ===
2000 Census Age Pyramid for Lafayette County

As of the 2000 census, there were 16,137 people, 6,211 households, and 4,378 families residing in the county. The population density was 26 people per square mile (10 people/km^{2}). There were 6,674 housing units at an average density of 10 per square mile (3.9/km^{2}). The racial makeup of the county was 99.03% White, 0.11% Black or African American, 0.11% Native American, 0.22% Asian, 0.04% Pacific Islander, 0.14% from other races, and 0.35% from two or more races. 0.57% of the population were Hispanic or Latino of any race. 33.8% were of German, 17.5% Norwegian, 13.6% Irish, 11.9% English, 6.8% Swiss and 6.0% American ancestry.

There were 6,211 households, out of which 33.30% had children under the age of 18 living with them, 59.00% were married couples living together, 7.60% had a female householder with no husband present, and 29.50% were non-families. 25.40% of all households were made up of individuals, and 13.10% had someone living alone who was 65 years of age or older. The average household size was 2.57 and the average family size was 3.10.

In the county, the population was spread out, with 27.20% under the age of 18, 7.60% from 18 to 24, 27.20% from 25 to 44, 22.10% from 45 to 64, and 15.80% who were 65 years of age or older. The median age was 38 years. For every 100 females there were 99.80 males. For every 100 females age 18 and over, there were 98.00 males.

== Communities ==
=== Cities ===
- Cuba City (mostly in Grant County)
- Darlington (county seat)
- Shullsburg

=== Villages ===
- Argyle
- Belmont
- Benton
- Blanchardville (partly in Iowa County)
- Gratiot
- Hazel Green (mostly in Grant County)
- South Wayne

=== Towns ===
- Argyle
- Belmont
- Benton
- Blanchard
- Darlington
- Elk Grove
- Fayette
- Gratiot
- Kendall
- Lamont
- Monticello
- New Diggings
- Seymour
- Shullsburg
- Wayne
- White Oak Springs
- Willow Springs
- Wiota

=== Census-designated places ===
- Wiota
- Woodford

=== Other unincorporated communities ===
- Avon
- Calamine
- Elk Grove
- Etna
- Fayette
- Five Corners
- Ipswich
- Jenkinsville
- Lamont
- Leadmine
- Leslie
- Meekers Grove
- New Diggings
- Red Rock
- Riverside
- Seymour Corners
- Slateford
- Strawbridge
- Truman
- White Oak
- Yellowstone

== Politics ==
United States presidential election results for Lafayette County, Wisconsin
Year	Republican		Democratic		Third party(ies)	
Year	No.	%	No.	%	No.	%
1892	2,366	47.87%	2,286	46.25%	291	5.89%
1896	2,919	54.74%	2,236	41.94%	177	3.32%
1900	2,852	55.83%	2,100	41.11%	156	3.05%
1904	2,875	58.19%	1,928	39.02%	138	2.79%
1908	2,832	55.96%	2,100	41.49%	129	2.55%
1912	1,747	39.14%	1,852	41.50%	864	19.36%
1916	2,544	54.07%	2,059	43.76%	102	2.17%
1920	4,893	76.11%	1,357	21.11%	179	2.78%
1924	2,671	34.69%	1,265	16.43%	3,763	48.88%
1928	5,134	58.53%	3,585	40.87%	52	0.59%
1932	3,246	39.52%	4,886	59.49%	81	0.99%
1936	3,801	41.11%	4,976	53.81%	470	5.08%
1940	5,059	53.71%	4,315	45.81%	45	0.48%
1944	4,421	54.27%	3,696	45.37%	30	0.37%
1948	3,288	46.28%	3,740	52.65%	76	1.07%
1952	5,731	66.23%	2,905	33.57%	17	0.20%
1956	4,733	59.33%	3,212	40.26%	33	0.41%
1960	4,715	56.60%	3,607	43.30%	8	0.10%
1964	3,194	41.64%	4,471	58.28%	6	0.08%
1968	4,084	55.10%	2,853	38.49%	475	6.41%
1972	4,898	62.91%	2,804	36.01%	84	1.08%
1976	4,131	50.48%	3,839	46.91%	213	2.60%
1980	4,421	51.46%	3,598	41.88%	572	6.66%
1984	4,584	60.43%	2,961	39.03%	41	0.54%
1988	3,665	50.69%	3,521	48.70%	44	0.61%
1992	2,582	32.85%	3,143	39.99%	2,134	27.15%
1996	2,172	33.62%	3,261	50.48%	1,027	15.90%
2000	3,336	45.93%	3,710	51.08%	217	2.99%
2004	3,929	46.84%	4,402	52.48%	57	0.68%
2008	2,984	38.10%	4,732	60.43%	115	1.47%
2012	3,314	41.68%	4,536	57.04%	102	1.28%
2016	3,977	51.91%	3,288	42.91%	397	5.18%
2020	4,821	56.35%	3,647	42.63%	87	1.02%
2024	5,256	59.51%	3,469	39.28%	107	1.21%

Lafayette County has been a reliably Republican county at the federal level for most of its existence. Starting in 1992 however, it voted for the Democratic presidential nominees six elections in a row before shifting back to the GOP in 2016.

== See also ==
- National Register of Historic Places listings in Lafayette County, Wisconsin
