= Jacob S. Bugh =

19th century American politician

County Judge of Waushara County, Wisconsin
- In office January 5, 1891 – October 23, 1901
- Preceded by: David Losey Bunn
- Succeeded by: John Clark

Member of the Wisconsin State Assembly from the Waushara County district
- In office January 1, 1883 – January 5, 1885
- Preceded by: Nathaniel W. Milliken
- Succeeded by: Samuel R. Clark
- In office January 2, 1860 – January 7, 1861
- Preceded by: Charles White
- Succeeded by: Henry G. Webb

Personal details
- Party: Republican
- Spouse: Lydia Ann Hood (m. 1861; died 1883)
- Children: Charles H. Bugh^{(b. 1862; died 1862)}; William A. Bugh^{(b. 1864; died 1915)}; Frances H. (Dubois)^{(b. 1866; died 1942)}
- Relatives: Samuel G. Bugh (brother); William A. Bugh (brother); Thomas Hood (father-in-law)

Military service
- Allegiance: United States
- Branch/service: United States Volunteers; Union Army; Wisconsin Militia
- Years of service: 1865
- Rank: Major, USV; Colonel, Wis. Militia
- Unit: Paymaster Corps
- Battles/wars: American Civil War

Jacob Sylvester Bugh (January 23, 1826 – October 23, 1901) was an American farmer, judge, and Wisconsin pioneer. He was one of the founders of Waushara County, Wisconsin, and represented the county for two terms in the Wisconsin State Assembly. He was county judge for the last 10 years of his life.

His brothers, William A. Bugh and Samuel G. Bugh, also served in the Wisconsin Legislature.

== Biography ==
Bugh was born in Somerset, Ohio, in January 1826, although sources have differed on the exact date. He was raised and educated there, studying in the district schools and the Somerset Academy.

In 1849, Bugh emigrated west to the new state of Wisconsin and settled on a claim in what is now Dakota, Wisconsin. At the time, this area of the state was mostly unorganized and attached to Marquette County. Bugh was instrumental in the effort to create a new county from the northern half of Marquette, which became Waushara County. He subsequently played an important role in the development of the county, including the location of the county seat at Wautoma, Wisconsin.

He was the first register of deeds for the county of Waushara, and was re-elected several times, serving seven years. In 1859, he was elected to the Wisconsin State Assembly on the Republican Party ticket, and served in the 1860 session of the Legislature.

At the outbreak of the American Civil War, he was appointed to the military staff of Governor Alexander Randall with the rank of colonel, to assist in raising Wisconsin volunteers for the Union Army. He served in the recruiting service for most of the war, and was appointed to the United States Volunteers paymaster corps by President Abraham Lincoln near the end of the war, with a commission in that service as a major.

After the war, he was appointed assessor of internal revenue for the 5th district of Wisconsin, by President Andrew Johnson, and served in that office for five years. He was subsequently appointed deputy collector of internal revenue, and served four years in that role. In local affairs, he served several years as chairman of the town board of Dakota, and was chairman of the Waushara County board of supervisors. He was returned to the Wisconsin State Assembly with the election of 1882, and served in the 1883–1884 session.

He was elected county judge of Waushara County in 1890, and was re-elected in 1896, serving until his death in 1901. Bugh died at his home in Wautoma, Wisconsin, on October 23, 1901.

== Personal life and family ==
Jacob S. Bugh was the sixth of nine children born to John Bugh and his wife Marian (née Wolfe). John Bugh was a staunch abolitionist and his home in Ohio was a stop on the Underground Railroad.

Jacobs's brothers, William Augustus Bugh and Samuel Gonsalus Bugh were also prominent settlers in early Wisconsin and both served in the Wisconsin Legislature.

Jacob Bugh married Lydia Ann Hood in 1861. Lydia Hood was a daughter of Thomas Hood, a Dane County judge and politician. Jacob and Lydia Bugh had three children, though one died in infancy.

Wisconsin State Assembly
Preceded by Charles White	Member of the Wisconsin State Assembly from the Waushara County district January 2, 1860 – January 7, 1861	Succeeded by Henry G. Webb
Preceded by Nathaniel W. Milliken	Member of the Wisconsin State Assembly from the Waushara County district January 1, 1883 – January 5, 1885	Succeeded by Samuel R. Clark
Legal offices
Preceded by David Losey Bunn	County Judge of Waushara County, Wisconsin; January 5, 1891 – October 23, 1901	Succeeded by John Clark
