= Perry County Courthouse =

Perry County Courthouse may refer to:

- Perry County Courthouse (Arkansas), Perryville, Arkansas
- Perry County Courthouse (Illinois), Pinckneyville, Illinois
- Old Perry County Courthouse (Indiana), Rome, Indiana
- Perry County Courthouse (Mississippi), New Augusta, Mississippi, a Mississippi Landmark
- Perry County Courthouse (Missouri), Perryville, Missouri
- Perry County Courthouse (Ohio), New Lexington, Ohio
- Old Perry County Courthouse (Ohio), Somserset, Ohio
- Perry County Courthouse (Pennsylvania), New Bloomfield, Pennsylvania
- Perry County Courthouse (Tennessee), Linden, Tennessee
