= Perry County Courthouse (Ohio) =

Local government building in the United States

- Perry County Courthouse and Jail
- U.S. National Register of Historic Places
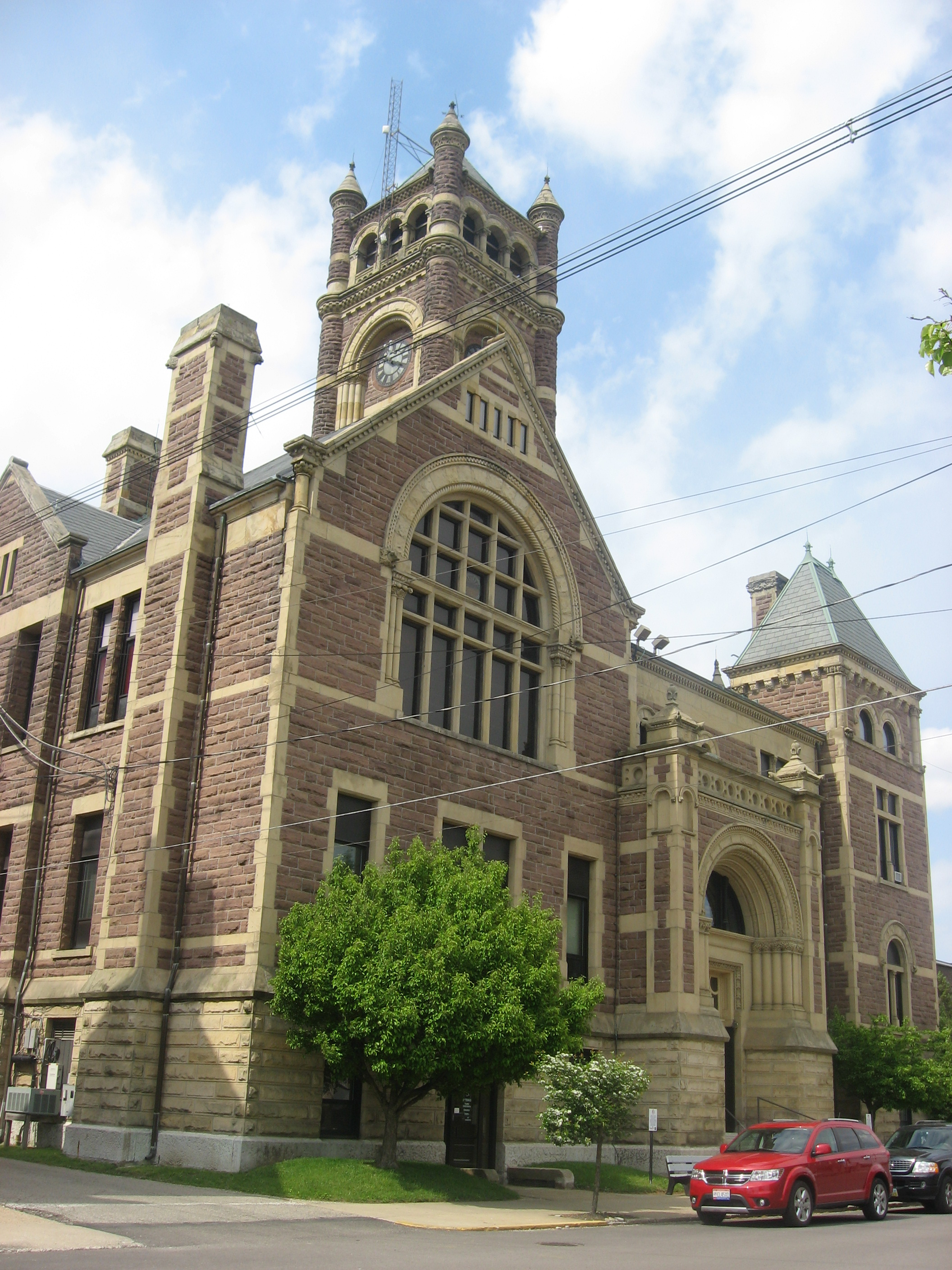
- Southern side of the courthouse

- Location within Ohio Location within the United States
- Interactive map showing the location of Perry County Courthouse
- Location: Main and Brown Sts., New Lexington, Ohio
- Coordinates: 39°42′50″N 82°12′30″W
- Area: Less than 1 acre (0.40 ha)
- Built: 1887
- Architect: Joseph W. Yost; Hibbert and Schaus
- Architectural style: Richardsonian Romanesque
- NRHP reference No.: 81000449
- Added to NRHP: October 8, 1981

The Perry County Courthouse is a historic government building in the city of New Lexington, Ohio, United States. Built near the end of the nineteenth century after the end of a county seat war, it is the fifth courthouse to serve Perry County, and it has been named a historic site because of its imposing architecture.

== History ==
After Perry County was established in 1817, the county commissioners and courts met for their first two years at John Fink's tavern on the eastern side of Somerset at the corner of Main Street (the Zane Trace) and High Street. At the end of the two years, county officials began using their newly completed jail as a courthouse; it was a jail more than anything else, and the commissioners and other people did not like to call it a courthouse, but a courtroom was provided in the second story, as well as room for other county officers. It functioned as a courthouse from 1819 until 1829. In 1826, bids were let for the construction of a purpose-built courthouse on Somerset's public square; it was occupied three years later, and the old "courthouse" jail soon succumbed to fire. Ever since the creation of the county, the village of New Lexington had been agitating to become the county seat, and a county seat war ensued in the 1850s; after three new state laws, three elections, and two decisions by the Supreme Court, the county offices departed Somerset for the upstart community in early 1857, leaving the old courthouse to be used by Somerset as its village hall.

The first courthouse at New Lexington was not paid for by the taxpayers in general, because advocates of New Lexington as county seat had raised the necessary amount through private donations. Among the stipulations of the state law permitting the removal of the county seat was that suitable buildings should be provided if the seat were to be moved; such a building was finished, but it stood vacant for several years before the offices were placed in it. As the end of the nineteenth century approached, the county's needs expanded to the point that the old courthouse was insufficient, and a fifth courthouse, the present structure, was erected in 1887 and dedicated one year later.

=== Recent history ===
In 1981, the Perry County Courthouse and its jail were listed together on the National Register of Historic Places, qualifying for designation both because of their architecture and because of their place in Ohio's history.

In the 1990s, the courthouse attracted statewide attention when a prominent lawsuit, DeRolph v. State, was filed in the Perry County Common Pleas Court. Claiming that Ohio's existing system of school funding violated the state constitution, a coalition of school districts in southern Ohio sued the state in 1991 in order to force through a fundamental change in school funding. Upon the county judge's ruling in favor of the coalition three years later, the lawsuit was appealed through the courts and received numerous trials in all levels of the Ohio judiciary throughout the rest of the decade, including multiple decisions by the Supreme Court.

== Architecture ==
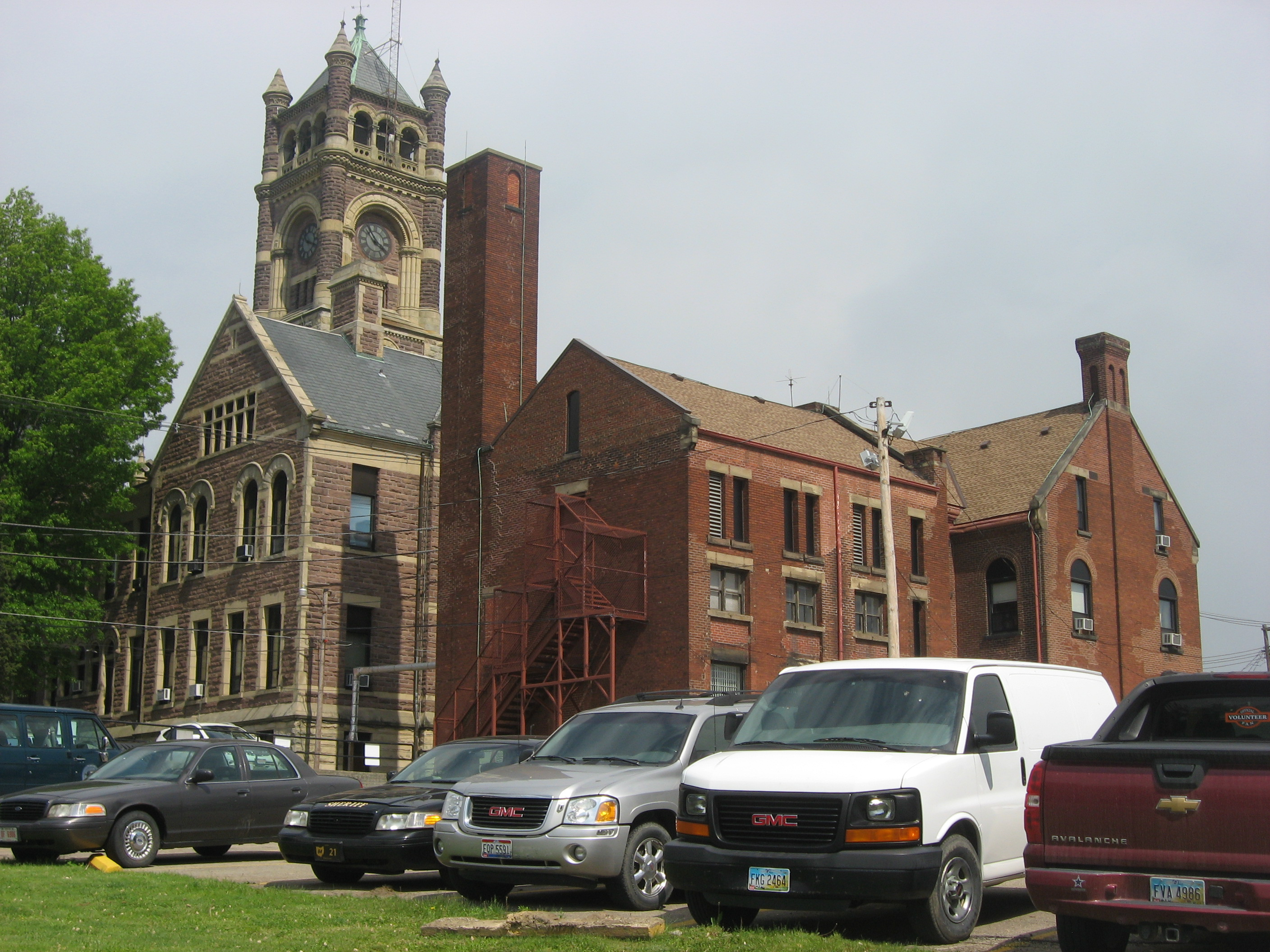
Courthouse and jail together

Designed by Joseph W. Yost, and built at a cost of $143,000, the present Perry County Courthouse is a large Richardsonian Romanesque building constructed of stone; the ashlar walls are laid in a random fashion, while the ashlar of the foundation is laid in a more regular manner. Visitors can enter the building through a grand recessed entrance under an archway at the top of a grand staircase; upon reaching the interior, they find themselves in a hallway with a tiled floor and plaster reliefs on the walls between the entrances for various county offices. The most prominent component of the exterior is the two-part clock tower in the center, which rises 40 feet (12 m) above the street, but the entire building derives an appearance of great size from its three-story construction and from the large monolithic wall above the main entrance. Its Romanesque influence is apparent from details such as the miniature turrets above the main entrance and on the corners of the tower. From its earliest years, the courthouse has been considered one of Ohio's grandest, due in part to its location in a small community in a rural county.

From 2023 to 2025, the courthouse underwent a major restoration and repair project. The effort began with work to repair deteriorating front steps to the building, but quickly grew in scope to include replacing the building's roof, foundation, and restoring historical elements. After asbestos was discovered in floor tiles, insulation, and window caulking, additional work was required. The building's original slate roof was replaced with a clay reproduction produced by local manufacturer Ludowici Roof Tile.

=== Jail ===
Located behind the courthouse is the old county jail, a three-story brick building. Also constructed in 1887, it succeeded the old courthouse as the jail; the 1857 courthouse included dedicated jail space on its first floor.
