= Ludowici Roof Tile Company Historic District =

Historic district in Ohio, United States

- U.S. National Register of Historic Places
- U.S. Historic district
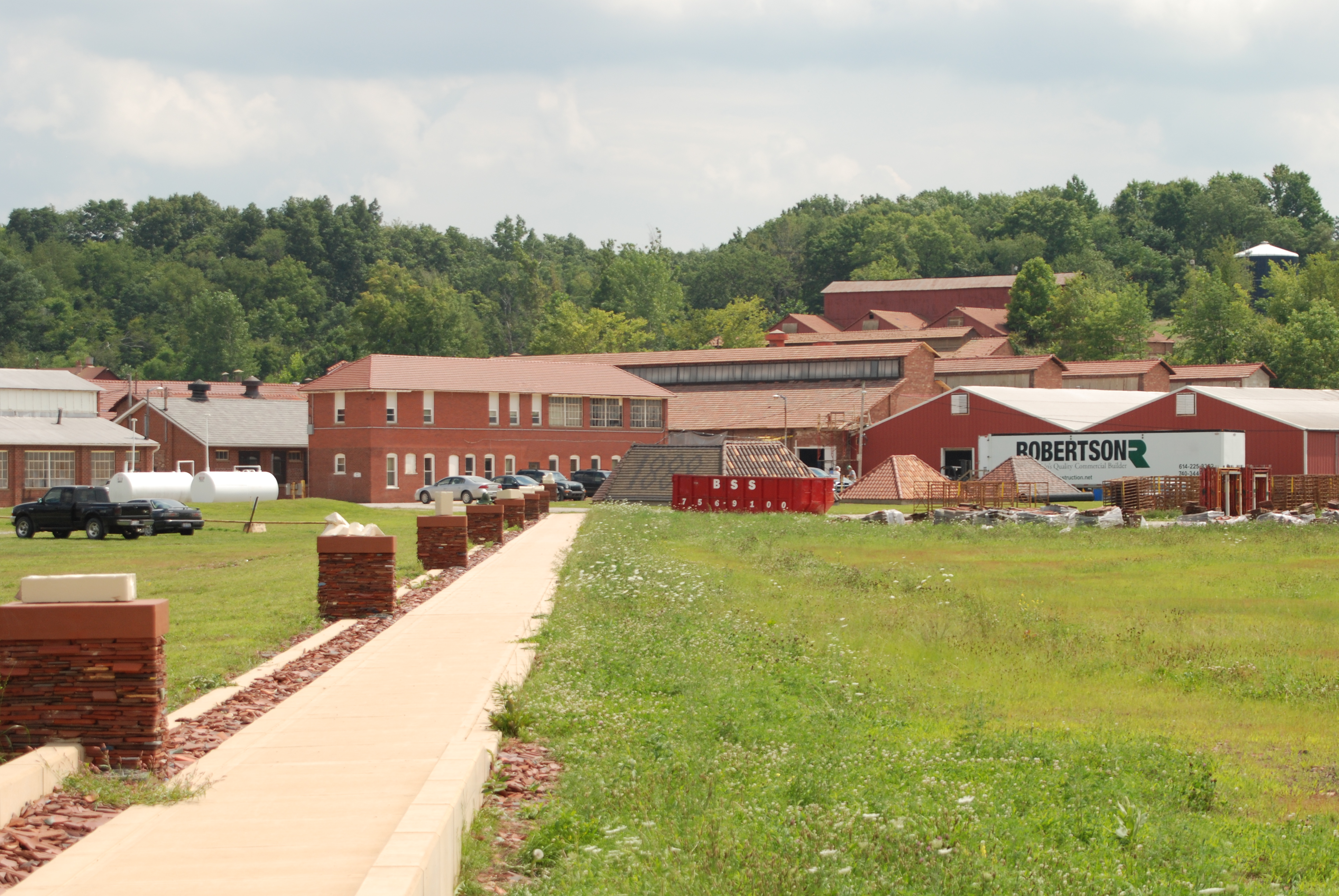

- Location within Ohio Location within the United States
- Location: 4757 Tile Plant Road, New Lexington, Ohio
- Coordinates: 39°43′18″N 82°14′29″W
- Area: 40 acres (16 ha)
- Architect: Wolsey Garnet Worcester
- Architectural style: Industrial
- NRHP reference No.: 100006136
- Added to NRHP: February 11, 2021

Ludowici Roof Tile Company Historic District is a historic district in New Lexington, Ohio. It was listed on the National Register of Historic Places in 2021.

The district is made of multiple buildings that comprise the New Lexington plant of the Ludowici Roof Tile Company. The plant was constructed in 1902 by Wolsey Garnet Worcester to be a brick and roof tile plant for the Imperial Clay Company, which was purchased by the Celadon Roofing Tile Company in 1905. The plant began exclusively producing roof tiles, and the following year Celadon merged with the Ludowici Roofing Tile Company to form Ludowici-Celadon.

The Ludowici-Celadon Company was one of the leading producers of clay roof tiles in the United States during the 20th century and its tiles were used on historically significant buildings throughout the world. After the merger the New Lexington plant was expanded multiple times to become the company's leading manufacturing site. After the onset of World War II domestic construction was reduced significantly and the company briefly employed area women to slip cast, glaze, and paint pottery pieces.

The company had operated seven plants in five states over the course of its existence but after the closure of its factory in Coffeyville, Kansas in 1956 the New Lexington site became its only remaining production location.

A resurgence in interest in historic restoration helped buoy the company through the 1970s and 1980s and the New Lexington site underwent improvements and some modernization. Older coal-fired brick kilns were removed and in 1991 North America's first hydrocasing kiln was installed to replace them.

In 2007 a former loading building was adaptively repurposed and turned into a showroom for the company, renamed Ludowici. In 2021 several of the factory buildings were added to the National Register of Historic Places as a historic district.

As of 2024 the factory continues to manufacture roof tiles and is still run by Ludowici.

== Gallery ==
Ludowici Roof Tile Company Historic District

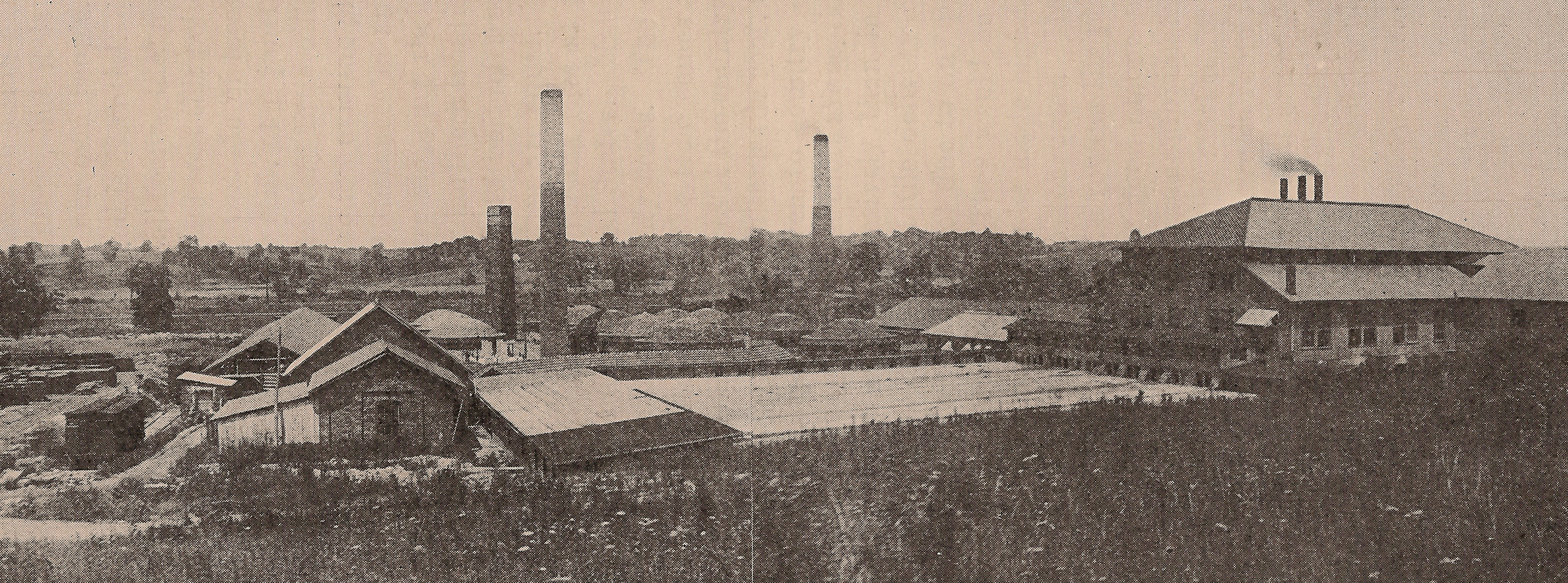
View of New Lexington factory facing Northeast in January 1908.
