= Terra Cotta Building (Alfred, New York) =

Historic office building in Alfred, Allegany County, New York

- U.S. National Register of Historic Places
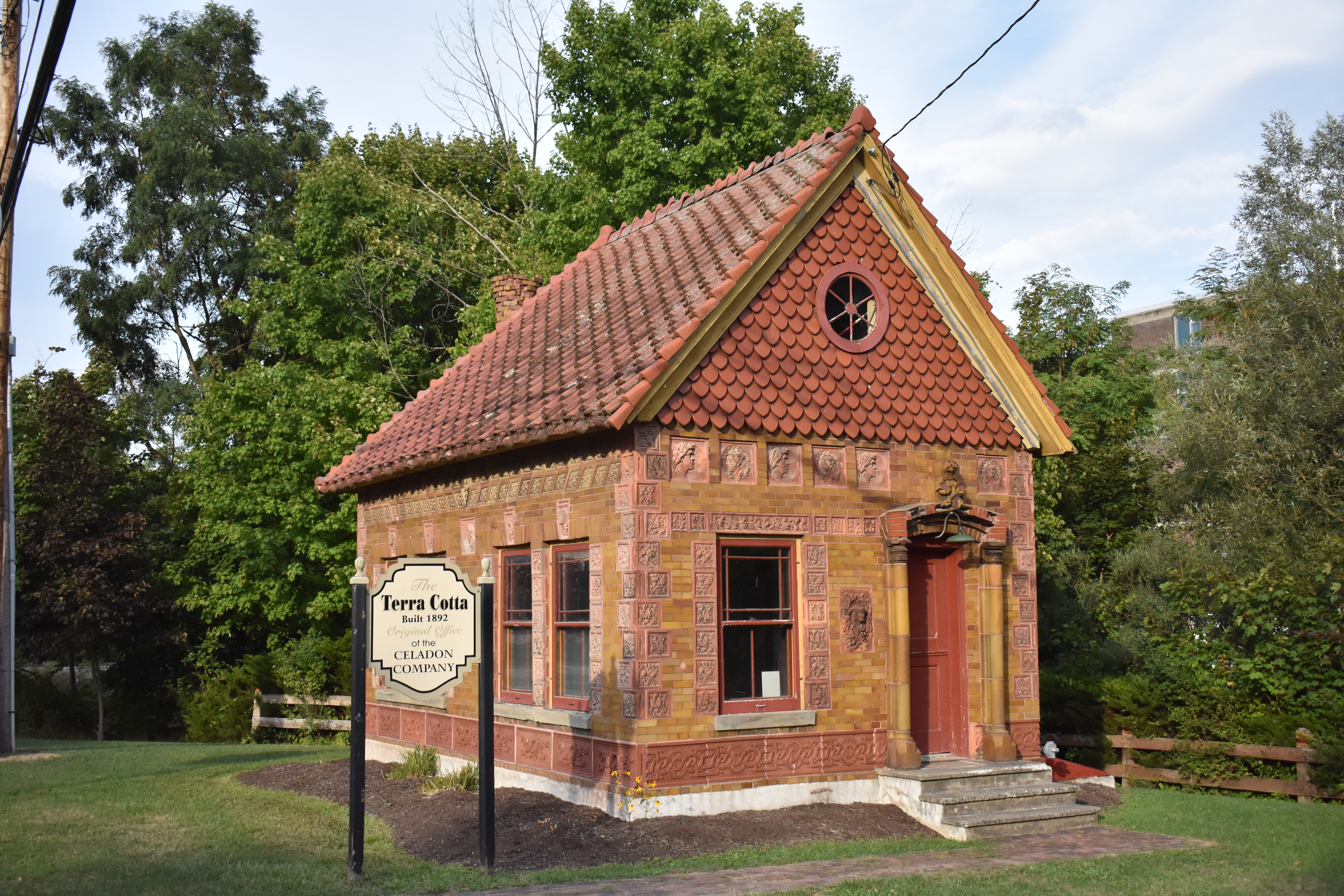
- The Terra Cotta Building, seen in 2022

- Location within New York Location within the United States
- Location: Main St., Alfred, New York
- Coordinates: 42°15′27″N 77°47′19″W
- Area: less than one acre
- Built: 1892
- Architect: Celadon Terra Cotta Company
- NRHP reference No.: 72000820
- Added to NRHP: March 16, 1972

The Terra Cotta Building is a historic building built by the Celadon Terra Cotta Company at Alfred, New York in 1892. The structure is a one-story, 16-foot-wide (4.9 m), 25-foot-deep (7.6 m) building built almost entirely of bricks, architectural terracotta, and roofing tiles manufactured by the company.

The building was built adjacent to the company's Alfred factory and functioned as a sales office and physical catalog of their work. After its construction, local papers reported that "there is probably no more novel or artistic building in Allegany county than the new office of the Alfred Centre Terra Cotta Company."

Under the early direction of George H. Babcock, the Celadon company grew to become a major producer of roof tiles. From the 1890s through the early 1900s the Alfred factory made tiles used on projects including mansions, train stations, and Carnegie libraries. In 1906 the company merged with the Ludowici Roofing Tile Company of Chicago to form the Ludowici-Celadon Company. On August 29, 1909, a fire destroyed the factory in Alfred, and the Ludowici-Celadon company relocated most operations to their other plants. The Terra Cotta building was spared from damage and housed various businesses in the following decades, including a gift shop that sold locally-made Glidden Pottery pieces in the 1940s.

In 1969, Alfred University announced plans to construct a new gymnasium on the former factory site, which would require moving or demolishing the Terra Cotta building. The Alfred Historical Society began efforts to preserve the building, listing it on the National Register of Historic Places in 1972 and relocating to its present site across from the village Post Office two years later. The Alfred Historical Society hosts open houses throughout the year for people wishing to examine the interior and learn about the history of the building and company.

== Gallery ==
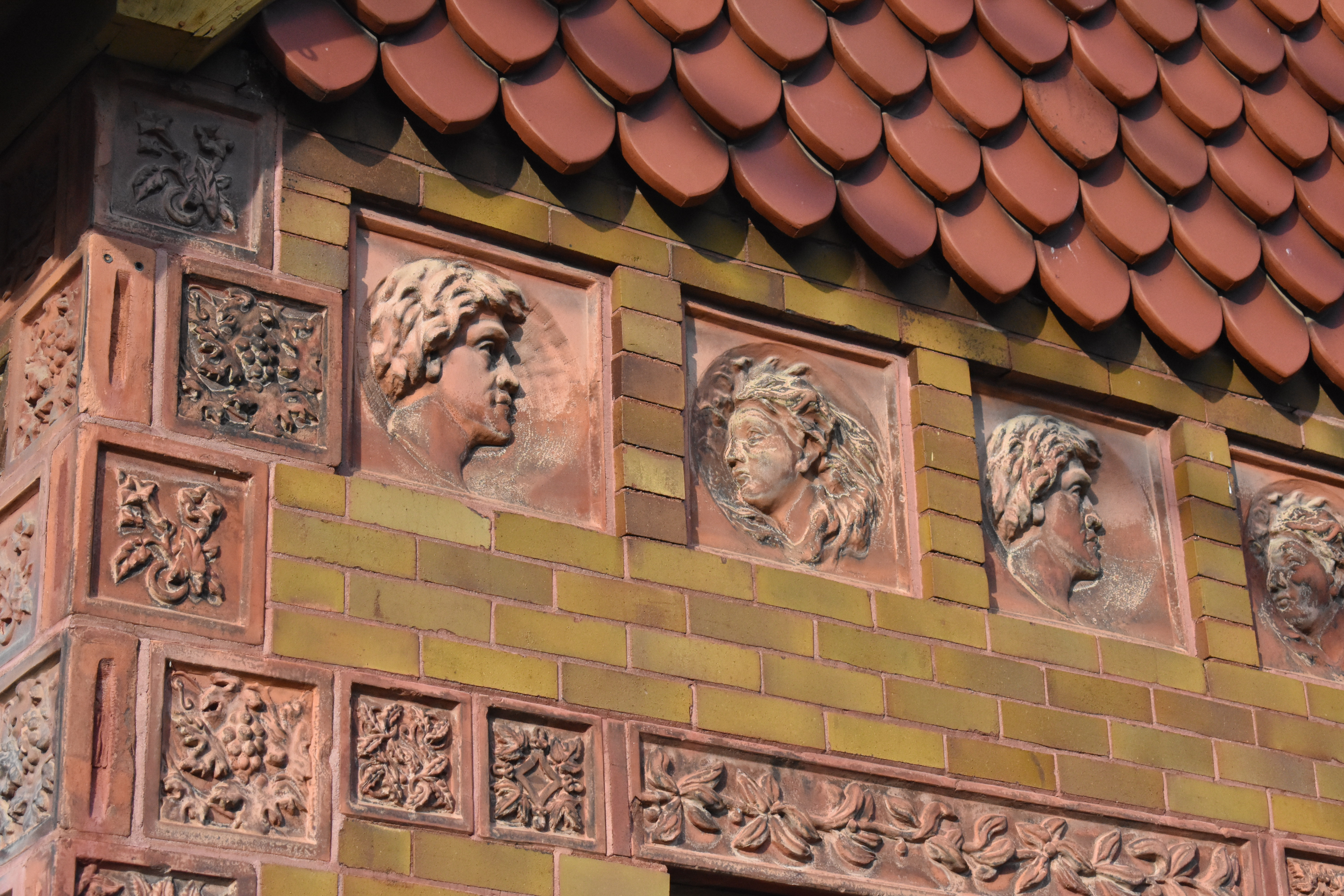
Close-up of terra cotta detailing

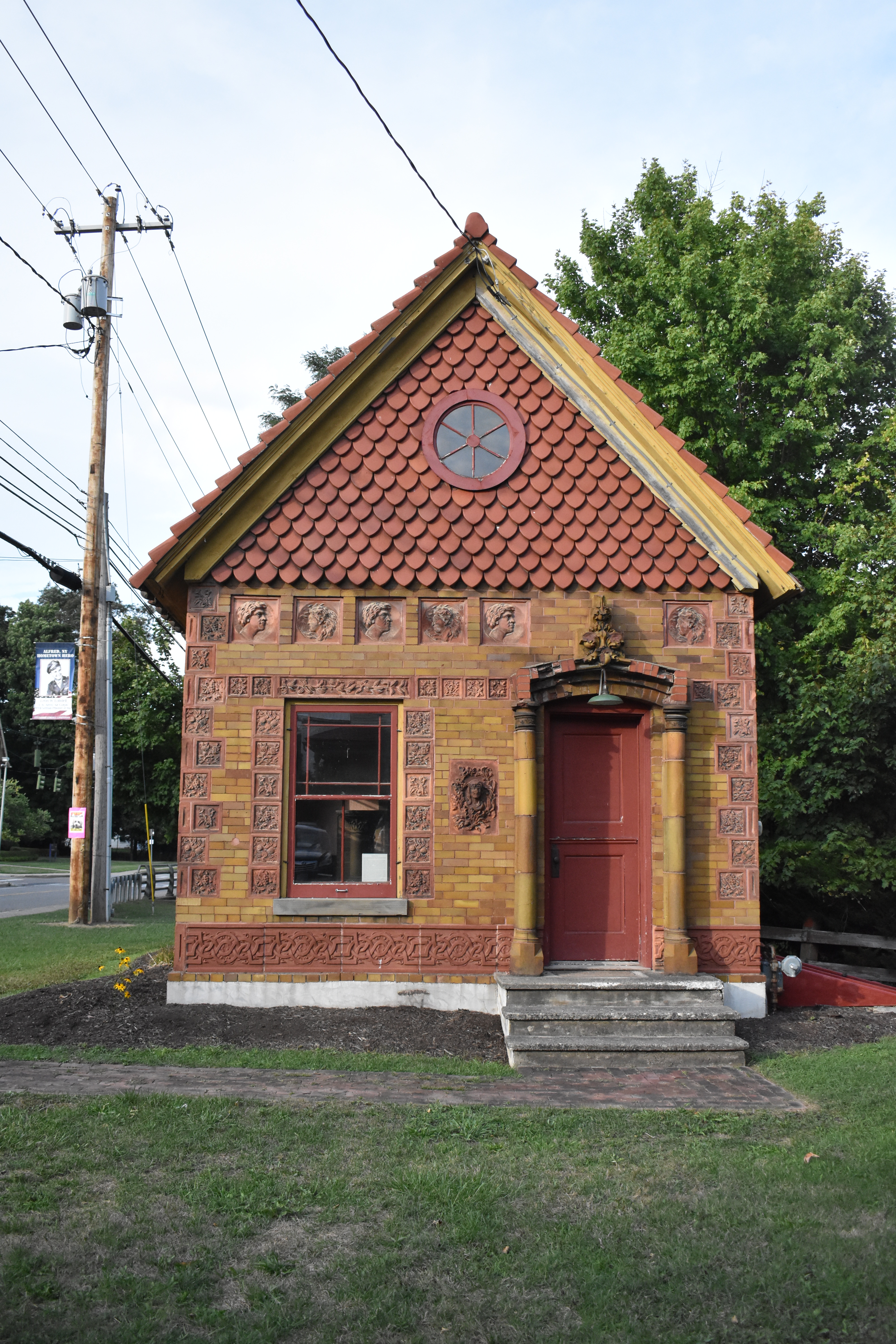
Head-on view of the Terra Cotta Building

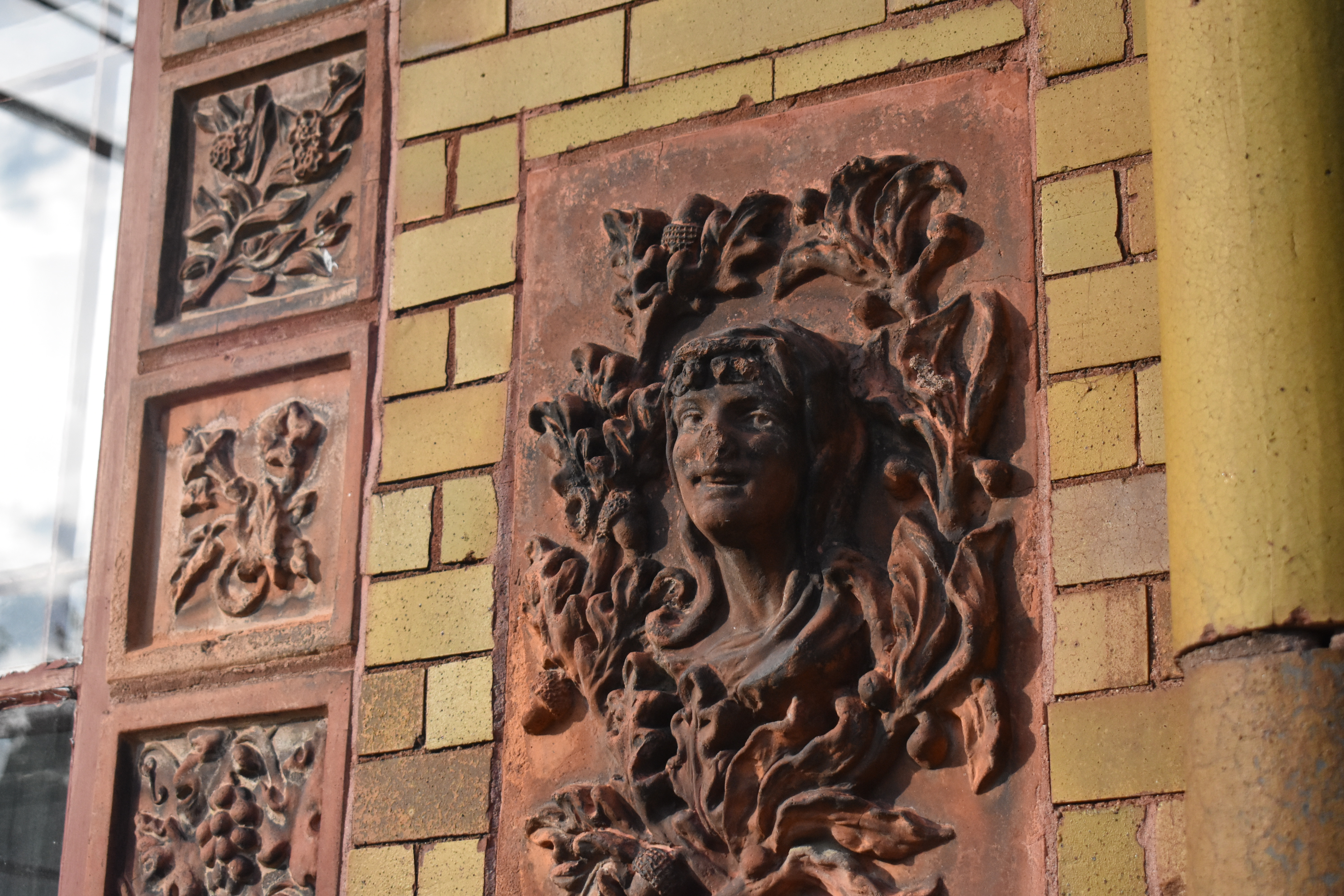
Close-up of terra cotta detailing

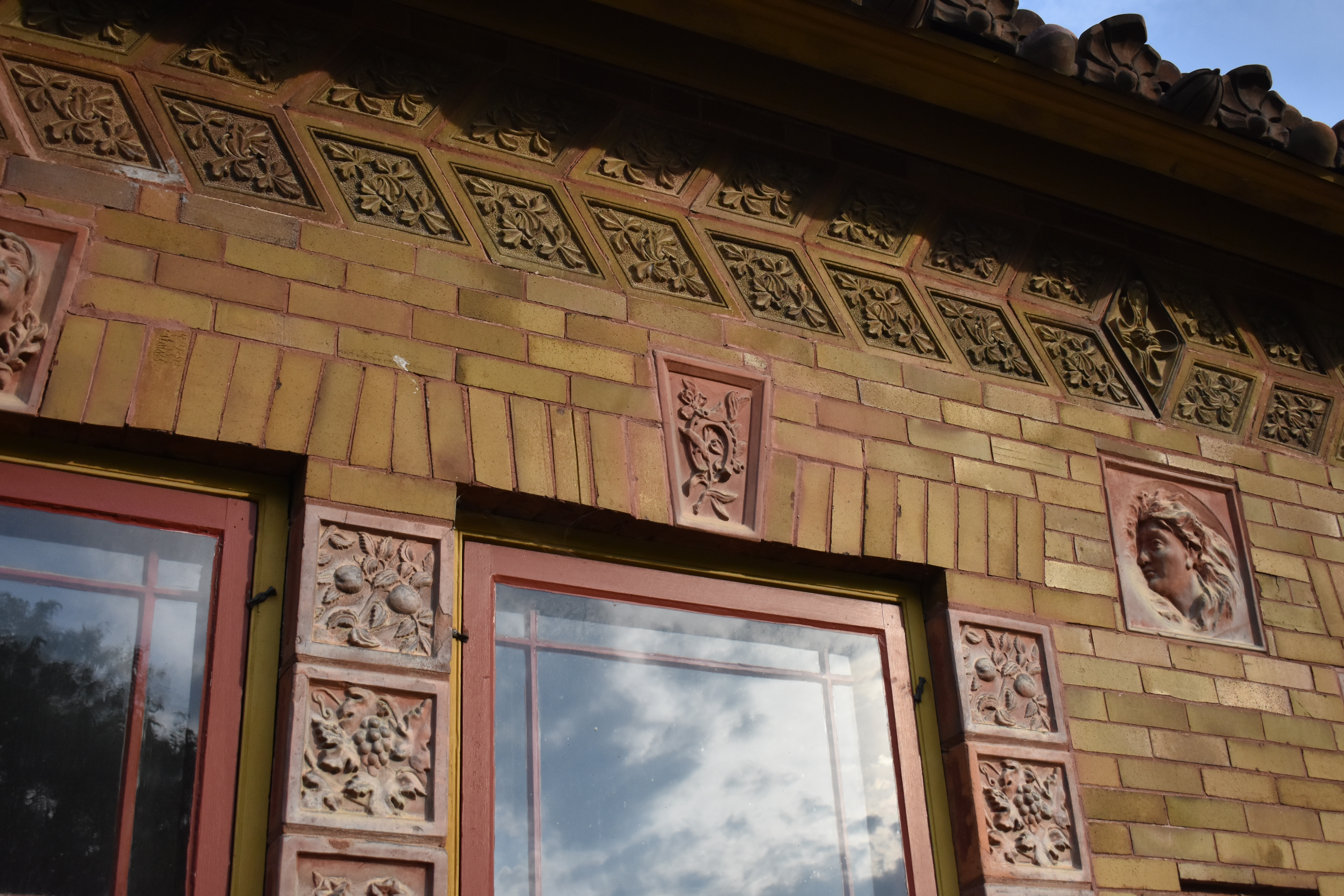
Close-up of ornamental detailing on north side of the Terra Cotta Building
