= Perry County Airport (Ohio) =

- IATA: none; ICAO: none; FAA LID: I86

Summary
- Airport type: Public
- Owner: Perry County Airport Authority
- Serves: New Lexington, Ohio
- Time zone: UTC−05:00 (-5)
  - Summer (DST): UTC−04:00 (-4)
- Elevation AMSL: 1,051 ft / 320 m
- Coordinates: 39°41′30″N 082°11′52″W
- Website: www.FlyPerry.com

Map
- Location of airport in Ohio I86 (the United States)

Runways
Direction	Length		Surface
Direction	ft	m	Surface
8/26	3,498	1,066	Asphalt

Statistics (2022)
- Aircraft operations: 4,524
- Based aircraft: 10
- Source: Federal Aviation Administration

Perry County Airport (FAA LID: I86) is a public use airport located two nautical miles (4 km) south of the central business district of New Lexington, in Perry County, Ohio, United States. It is owned by the Perry County Airport Authority. This airport is included in the National Plan of Integrated Airport Systems for 2011–2015, which categorized it as a general aviation facility.

The airport has a unique arrangement in that a rail line passes underneath the runway.

== History ==
The 40-acre (16 ha) Newlon Airport was established by the eponymous family in 1946. In November 1966, it was transferred to the county to be used as the basis for the Perry County Airport. At that time it had two grass runways, 1,900 ft (580 m) and 1,300 ft (400 m) in length. A construction contract was awarded on 14 June 1967 and work started the same day. Site preparation was begun by Peabody Coal Company, but stopped in September after one of the excavators left the site and the other was forced to halt by rock that would require blasting. Further problems occurred in the form of a powerline that the county did not have money to relocate. Concerns were then raised that attempts to remove the rock would damage a Penn Central railroad tunnel. The tunnel was strengthened by September 1968 and by early July 1969, the length of the proposed runway had been reduced from 4,000 ft (1,200 m) to 3,500 ft (1,100 m). The airport received another $50,000 from the state to pay for elements of the plan – fencing, lighting and an airport beacon – that had been previously dropped due to cost. Bidding for paving the runway was restarted in mid March 1970 after the previous contract lapsed due to delays. The airport was dedicated on 23 August 1970. A taxiway and turnaround were paved by mid November 1970.

The airport received a $50,000 grant from the state to resurface the runway in 1985.

A new hangar had been built at the airport by early December 2007.

In 2021, the airport received a $22,000 grant to fund operations, personnel, cleaning, sanitization, janitorial services, debt service payments, and combating the spread of pathogens. The airport received a federal grant in 2023 to reconfigure its taxiway.

== Facilities and aircraft ==
Perry County Airport covers an area of 53 acres (21 ha) at an elevation of 1,051 feet (320 m) above mean sea level. It has one runway designated 8/26 with an asphalt surface measuring 3,498 by 75 feet (1,066 x 23 m).

The airport has a fixed-base operator that sells fuel.

For the 12-month period ending August 4, 2022, the airport had 4,524 aircraft operations, an average of 87 per week. It was 99% general aviation and 1% military. At that time there were 10 aircraft based at the airport, all single-engine airplanes.

== Accidents and incidents ==
- On 22 September 1968, an unknown Cessna participating in an air tour struck a fence while landing at the airport, damaging both.
- On 17 October 1978, two single-engine airplanes collided on the ground at the airport, killing four and injuring one.
- On April 6, 2019, a Piper Arrow crashed at the airport while attempting to land.
- On 5 February 2025, a Cirrus SR22 crashed while attempting to land at the airport, injuring the pilot and a passenger.

== See also ==
- List of airports in Ohio
