= William A. Bugh =

19th century American lawyer

Member of the Wisconsin State Assembly from the Green Lake County district
- In office January 1, 1866 – January 7, 1867
- Preceded by: Lorentus J. Brayton
- Succeeded by: Charles Kilbourn

Personal details
- Born: July 29, 1823 Somerset, Ohio, U.S.
- Died: August 19, 1875 (aged 52) Berlin, Wisconsin, U.S.
- Cause of death: Tuberculosis
- Resting place: Oakwood Cemetery, Berlin, Wisconsin
- Party: Republican; Natl. Union (1862–1867); Whig (before 1854)
- Spouse: Amanda Augusta Brown (died 1922)
- Relatives: Samuel G. Bugh (brother); Jacob S. Bugh (brother)

Military service
- Allegiance: United States
- Branch/service: United States Volunteers; Union Army
- Years of service: 1861–1863
- Rank: Lt. Colonel, USV
- Unit: 5th Reg. Wis. Vol. Infantry; 32nd Reg. Wis. Vol. Infantry
- Battles/wars: American Civil War

William Augustus Bugh (July 29, 1823 – August 19, 1875) was an American lawyer, politician, and Wisconsin pioneer. He served one term in the Wisconsin State Assembly, representing Green Lake County, and was a Union Army officer in the American Civil War.

His brothers, Samuel G. Bugh and Jacob S. Bugh, also served in the Wisconsin Legislature.

== Biography ==
Born in Somerset, Ohio, Bugh graduated from what is now the Indiana University Maurer School of Law. He then moved to Wisconsin and eventually settled in Berlin, Wisconsin, where he practiced law and was the editor of the local newspaper, the Madison Statesman.

At the outbreak of the American Civil War, Bugh raised a company of volunteers, known as the "Berlin Light Guards", to serve in the Union Army. The company elected him captain and was soon organized into Company G of the 5th Wisconsin Infantry Regiment. He went east with the regiment and was badly wounded in one of their first battles, at Williamsburg, Virginia, in May 1862. He never fully recovered from the wounds, as was described as crippled for life. Nevertheless, four months later he accepted a new commission as lieutenant colonel of the 32nd Wisconsin Infantry Regiment. However, his wounds proved too severe and he was never able to meet the new regiment, he resigned in April 1863 due to disability.

Bugh returned to Wisconsin and was appointed postmaster at Berlin, Wisconsin, an office he would hold until his death. In 1866, Bugh also served in the Wisconsin State Assembly, running on the Republican Party ticket.

Bugh was originally a Whig, and published his Statesman newspaper as a Whig organ. He joined the Republican Party when it was established in 1854, but was affiliated with the National Union Party during the war years.

Bugh died of tuberculosis at his home in Berlin, Wisconsin, on August 19, 1875.

== Personal life and family ==
William A. Bugh was the fifth of nine children born to John Bugh and his wife Marian (née Wolfe). John Bugh was a staunch abolitionist and his home in Ohio was a stop on the Underground Railroad.

William's brothers, Jacob Sylvester Bugh and Samuel Gonsalus Bugh were also prominent settlers in early Wisconsin and both served in the Wisconsin Legislature.

William Bugh married Amanda Augusta Brown. There were no known children of this marriage.

Wisconsin State Assembly
Preceded by Lorentus J. Brayton	Member of the Wisconsin State Assembly from the Green Lake County district January 1, 1866 – January 7, 1867	Succeeded by Charles Kilbourn
