= Thomas Hood (American politician) =

American politician

Thomas Hood (September 28, 1816 – November 22, 1883) was an American lawyer and politician.

Born in Somerset, Ohio, he was admitted to the Ohio bar in 1838. In 1850, Hood moved to Milwaukee, Wisconsin and then to Madison, Wisconsin. In 1853, he served as sergeant-at-arms for the Wisconsin Legislature. Hood was elected Dane County, Wisconsin judge in 1857 and 1861. During the 1864 and 1865 sessions, he represented the 26th District in the Wisconsin State Senate. A Republican, he was affiliated with the National Union Party. In 1869, Hood moved to Washington, D.C. where he was the auditor for the District of Columbia Supreme Court. In 1883, Hood moved back to Madison, Wisconsin because of poor health. He died in Madison, Wisconsin. Hood's son-in-law, Jacob S. Bugh, was a member of the Wisconsin State Assembly.
