= Samuel G. Bugh =

19th century American politician

Member of the Wisconsin Senate from the 7th district
- In office January 6, 1851 – January 3, 1853
- Preceded by: Dennis Murphy
- Succeeded by: John W. Cary

Clerk of the Wisconsin Circuit Court for Lafayette County
- In office January 1, 1849 – January 6, 1851
- Preceded by: Position established
- Succeeded by: D. W. Kyle

Register of Deeds of Lafayette County, Wisconsin
- In office May 1847 – January 1, 1849
- Preceded by: Position established
- Succeeded by: John W. Long

Personal details
- Born: January 21, 1821 Perry County, Ohio, U.S.
- Died: August 10, 1875 (aged 54) Mineral Point, Wisconsin, U.S.
- Cause of death: Morphine overdose
- Resting place: Union Grove Cemetery, Darlington, Wisconsin
- Party: Republican; Democratic (before 1861)
- Spouse: Mary J. McNulty (m. 1848; died 1848)
- Children: none
- Relatives: Jacob S. Bugh (brother); William A. Bugh (brother)

Samuel Gonsalus Bugh (January 21, 1821 – August 10, 1875) was an American physician, newspaper publisher, politician, and Wisconsin pioneer. He served two years in the Wisconsin State Senate, representing Lafayette County, and published the Pick and Gad newspaper in Shullsburg, Wisconsin.

His brothers, William A. Bugh and Jacob S. Bugh, also served in the Wisconsin Legislature.

== Early career ==
Samuel G. Bugh was born in Perry County, Ohio, in January 1821. He came to the Wisconsin Territory in 1844 and settled in what was then southern Iowa County.

In 1847, Lafayette County was created from this part of Iowa County, and Bugh was elected the first register of deeds for the new county. Instead of running for re-election in 1848, he ran for and was elected to the new office of circuit court clerk for Lafayette County. He stopped practicing medicine around this time.

In 1850, Bugh was elected to the Wisconsin State Senate from the 7th Senate district, running on the Democratic Party ticket. He represented Lafayette County in the Senate during the 1851 and 1852 sessions of the Legislature.

In 1853, he became a partner in the production of the Pick and Gad, one of the first newspapers printed in Shullsburg, Wisconsin. He published the paper for three years in partnership with the paper's founder, Walter Nimocks, and was editor for the paper in 1853 and most of 1854.

At the start of the 1854 session of the Legislature, he was elected chief clerk of the State Senate. He served in the same role in the 1855 session.

== Corruption accusations ==
He was appointed to a commission for the construction of the first Wisconsin Asylum for the Insane in April 1854, by Governor William A. Barstow. This project created significant controversy over the contract bidding process. Bugh was later seen as someone who helped expose the corruption, while also having participated in it. A legislative committee investigated the process, but no criminal charges resulted. Bugh's reputation was tarred for his part in the commission, and for his association with the administration of Governor Barstow, which had a number of other corruption issues.

Nevertheless, Republican Governor Alexander Randall appointed him to the commission for selecting and appraising school lands in 1858. The appointment was met with widespread condemnation from Republican newspapers in the state. It was alleged that the appointment was secured by state senator Luther Hanchett, and that Bugh used his time in office working instead to secure Hanchett the Republican nomination for United States House of Representatives in 1858. A year later, the Bugh appointment still ranked as a strike against Randall as he sought renomination from the Republican State Convention.

== Split with Democrats ==
Before the Civil War, Bugh was a frequent attendee at Democratic county, district, and state conventions. He was active in several campaigns, and was frequently accused of soliciting offices and "political prostitution". A notable change began with an incident at the 1859 Democratic State Convention, when Bugh introduced a tongue-in-cheek resolution cheering President James Buchanan for his actions which he suggested would ultimately secure the admission of Kansas into the United States as a free state. Buchanan had, in fact, been working for two years to admit Kansas as a slave state, but his efforts had created a schism in the Democratic Party that would bring about the election of a Republican administration. Bugh then went on to excoriate the Buchanan appointees in Wisconsin for their hypocrisy in voting against his mocking resolution.

After the outbreak of the American Civil War, Bugh became a zealous Republican. In 1864, Bugh was hired as a clerk in the United States House of Representatives. He subsequently appointed as a postal carrier by President Ulysses S. Grant. In that capacity, he was involved in a major boat fire in 1870. He had booked passage on the steamer War Eagle to carry postage from La Crosse to the southeast. The steamer was preparing to get underway from La Crosse, Wisconsin, when an accidental fire spread over the entire ship. Most of the mail was destroyed, but Bugh managed to save the cash and registered mail.

He was still employed as a postal carrier at the time of his death, in August 1875. His death was said to have been caused by a Morphine overdose.

== Personal life and family ==
Samuel G. Bugh was the fourth of nine children born to John Bugh and his wife Marian (née Wolfe). John Bugh was a staunch abolitionist and his home in Ohio was a stop on the Underground Railroad.

Samuel's younger brothers, Jacob Sylvester Bugh and William Augustus Bugh were also prominent settlers in early Wisconsin, both served in the Wisconsin State Assembly, and both became officers in the Union Army during the Civil War.

In 1848, Samuel Bugh married Mary J. McNulty, but she died just months later. He never remarried and had no known children.

Wisconsin Senate
Preceded by Dennis Murphy	Member of the Wisconsin Senate from the 7th district January 6, 1851 – January 3, 1853	Succeeded by John W. Cary
Political offices
New county government	Register of Deeds of Lafayette County, Wisconsin; May 1847 – January 1, 1849	Succeeded by John W. Long
Legal offices
New office established	Clerk of the Wisconsin Circuit Court for Lafayette County; January 1, 1849 – January 6, 1851	Succeeded by D. W. Kyle
