= Old Perry County Courthouse (Ohio) =

- U.S. Historic district – Contributing property
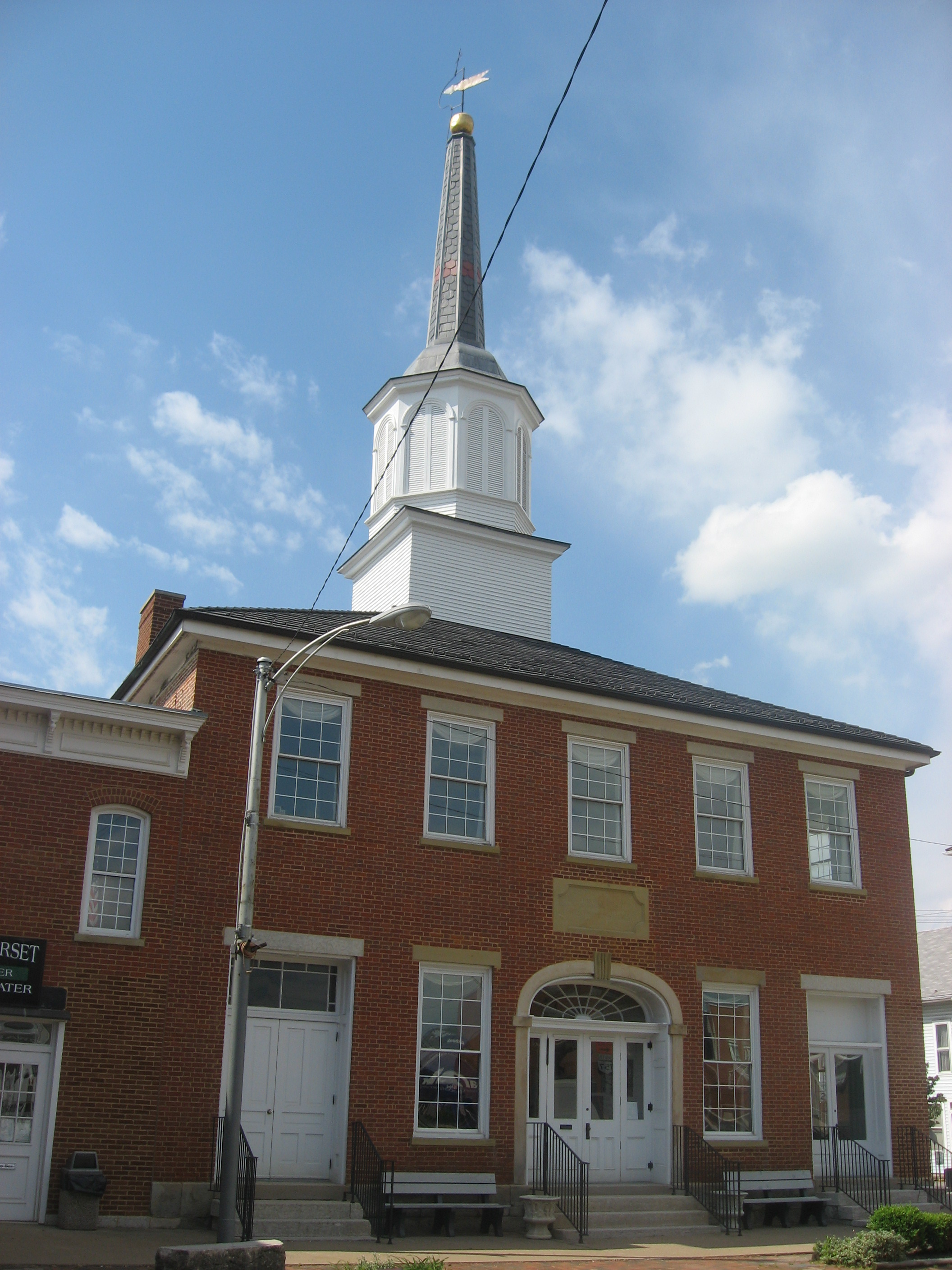
- Front of the courthouse

- Location within Ohio Location within the United States
- Interactive map showing the location of Old Perry Courthouse
- Location: Main and Columbus Streets, Somerset, Ohio
- Coordinates: 39°48′26″N 82°17′59″W
- Built: 1829
- Architectural style: Federal
- Part of: Somerset Historic District (ID75001516)
- Added to NRHP: September 5, 1975

The Old Perry County Courthouse is a historic government building in the village of Somerset, Ohio, United States. Built in the 1820s as a courthouse, it is one of Ohio's oldest existing buildings constructed for that purpose, and it has seen the controversy of a county seat war. For much of its history, it has served as Somerset's village hall, and it is located within a federally designated historic district.

== Historic context ==
The village of Somerset was established in 1810 by settlers from Somerset, Pennsylvania at the spot on Zane's Trace located midway between Lancaster and Zanesville. Seven years later, parts of Fairfield, Muskingum, and Washington counties were merged to create Perry County, and the house of a Somerset resident was named the first temporary courthouse. In 1819, the county government arranged for the erection of a building in Somerset; while most of the building was used for a jail, it also included a courtroom and space for some county offices. Ten years later, the present building was constructed on the village's public square; officials quickly found it to be insufficiently large for their needs, so until a new jail was built adjacent to the courthouse in 1848, some offices remained in the jail.

As the village of New Lexington grew in importance, its residents began to agitate for the county seat to be moved to their community. From 1851 to 1859, the state legislature passed three separate laws to permit the county seat to be moved; contentious elections and a decision by the Supreme Court of Ohio saw the county seat move to New Lexington, back to Somerset, and finally back to New Lexington. After it ceased to be used as a courthouse, the building was leased to Somerset for use as its village hall. It has outlasted its successor; the original courthouse in New Lexington became too small for the county's needs by the late 1880s and was replaced by the current courthouse in 1888.

== Architecture ==
The Old Perry County Courthouse is a two-story brick building with a stone foundation constructed at a total cost of $6,600. It originally measured 45 by 42 feet (14 m × 13 m), although the construction of the jail led to its modification. A cupola sits atop the building, which measures five bays wide on the front. None of the names of its architects and builders are known. Although the original central doorway survived into the 1950s, the other two doors in the facade were replaced by that time; they had been repurposed to permit direct access to the second floor, which had been converted into spaces for an American Legion post, a library, and a barbershop. No dormer windows pierce the hip roof, which was likely covered with slates when built. Wooden trim decorates the cornice and the eaves. Inside, nothing survives of the original floor plan. The building sits on the northwestern corner of the junction of Main and Columbus Streets, facing southeast into the public square.

=== Inscription ===
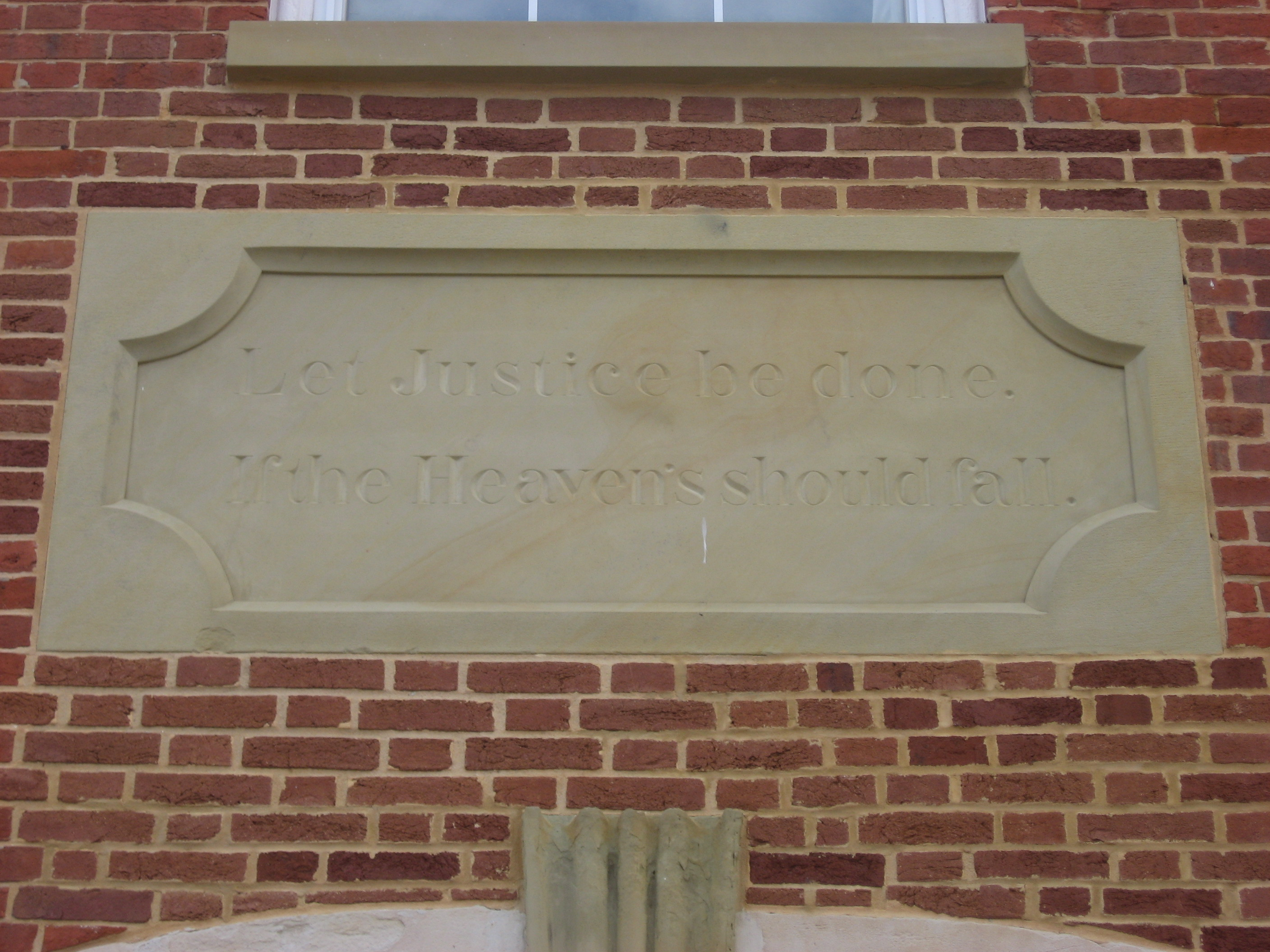

One of the most distinctive elements of the courthouse is an inscription carven into the stone lintel over the main entrance: "Let Justice be done. If the Heavens should fall". This unusual text has received widespread attention and provoked speculation regarding both its meaning and its origin. Legend suggests that the phrase was originally intended to read "Let Justice be done though the Heavens fall" but was changed by the stonemason, who ran out of room for the longer word. In his Historical Collections of Ohio, Henry Howe spends most of his sparse description of the courthouse on this phrase, which he portrays as a former Somerset resident's primary memory of the building. Another author, writing in 1901, pronounced the phrase "wonderful" but remarked on its unusual wording:

As to its real meaning this inscription has long been an enigma. It is a case wherein considerable reading between the lines can be indulged. If the period after the word done be changed to a comma, as was evidently the intention, we are left in a considerable quandary as to the time when justice will prevail. If the period be allowed to remain, then we have two sentences. The first one sounds very well and is a noble sentiment. Then after the second sentence we are obliged to place an exclamation point, all of which then seems to convey the idea, that the justice therein administered, was such a rarity, that when it was rendered, the heavens would certainly collapse.

— Martzolff, Clement Luther. History of Perry County, Ohio. New Lexington: Ward and Weiland, 1902, 134.

Meanwhile, a biography of Somerset native General Philip Sheridan, deeming the inscription a grammatical error, repeats a legend that blames a foreigner for the mistake — when the village council met to determine what motto should be carven into the stone, they failed to agree on a text, so they turned to a highly educated German who was resident in the village. This German, who believed himself to have been wronged in a recent lawsuit, suggested the phrase and insisted that the county judge (who had presided over the recent lawsuit) must take credit for it. As a result, when the error was observed a year later, the judge came under such heavy criticism that he was forced to move out of state. Elsewhere, the phrase has been viewed more kindly: as a "quaint, old Irish bull", or as simply as the creation of a well-meaning pioneer who was possessed of bad rhetoric.

== Preservation ==
As a typical representative of Ohio's early courthouses, and as the oldest building in the former Northwest Territory in continuous governmental use, the building has benefited from a state-funded restoration project. In 1975, much of Somerset was designated a historic district, the Somerset Historic District, and listed on the National Register of Historic Places; the courthouse was one of the most important contributing properties in the district. It is one of just two surviving first-generation Federal courthouses in the state, along with the Old Meigs County Courthouse in Chester.
