= Samuel Reed Clark =

American politician

Samuel Reed Clark was an American politician. He was a member of the Wisconsin State Assembly representing Waushara County, Wisconsin in 1878, 1879 and 1885. Initially serving as a Republican, he later became an independent. He was born on July 15, 1826, in Gorham, New York.
