= Ludowici Roof Tile =

American terra cotta manufacturing company

Ludowici Roof Tile, LLC.
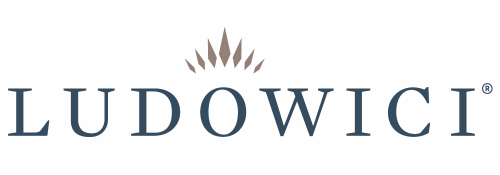
- Type: Private
- Industry: Architectural manufacturer
- Predecessors: Celadon Terra Cotta Company, Ludowici Roofing Tile Company, Celadon Roofing Tile Company, Ludowici-Celadon Inc.
- Founded: 1888, Alfred, New York, U.S.
- Headquarters: New Lexington, Ohio, United States
- Key people: Carl Ludowici, Franz Ludowici, Wilhelm Ludowici, George Herman Babcock
- Products: Roofing Tile, Floor Tile, Wall Cladding
- Website: ludowici.com

Ludowici Roof Tile, LLC. is an American manufacturer of clay roof tiles, floor tiles, and wall cladding. Based in New Lexington, Ohio, it was established in 1888 with the formation of the Celadon Terra Cotta Company in Alfred, New York. It has created tiles for many prominent buildings throughout the United States.

== History ==
=== Ludowici Roofing Tile Company ===
Carl Ludowici was a machinist in Ensheim, Germany and in 1857, he purchased a local roof tile factory, upgrading it with machines of his design, and founded the Carl Ludowici Ziegelwerke. The firm moved to a factory in Ludwigshafen in 1861 and gradually expanded, largely due to the innovative nature of Ludowici's steam-powered tile press. After Carl died in 1881, his sons, Wilhelm and Franz, took over the company, with Franz taking over business management and Wilhelm leading design and development. The company largely relocated to Jockgrim, where it grew into one of the major German tile manufacturers of its era.

In 1893, the Ludowicis licensed their patents and designs to the newly formed Ludowici Roofing Tile Company of Chicago. This company exhibited tiles at the World's Columbian Exposition that year, and with its factory in Chicago Heights, grew to become a leading producer of roof tiles by the turn of the century.

Ludowici built a factory in the unincorporated community of Liberty City, Georgia, in 1902. As a tribute to the company, the city was incorporated as Ludowici, Georgia, in 1905.

=== Celadon Terra Cotta Company ===
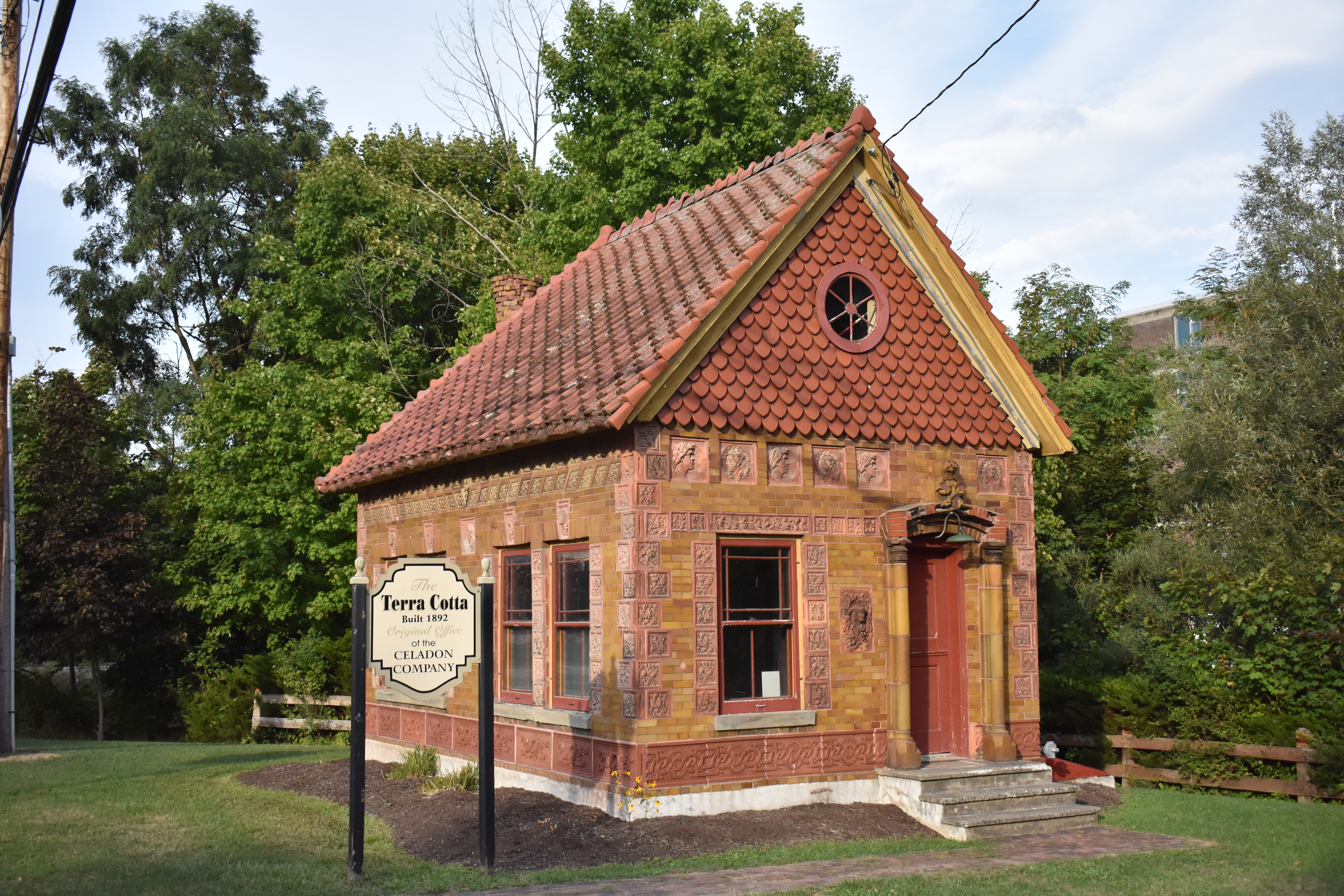
Celadon Company office building in 2022

In 1888, a sculpting professor at Alfred University in Alfred, New York, found that the local supply of clay was well-suited for ornamental sculpting work, and found other local investors to form the Celadon Terra Cotta Company, named for the green hue the clay took on when salt-fired. After visiting a friend in the area, George Herman Babcock became interested in the possibilities of terra cotta and bought stock, eventually becoming the president of the company. As president, he filed patents for multiple profiles of tile, such as the Conosera tile and unique combination tiles with different designs but a standard base, allowing for multiple styles of interlocking tile to be used on the same roof.

Babcock died in 1893, but the company continued to grow as it shifted focus towards roofing tile and was renamed the Celadon Roofing Tile Company in 1900. Shortly after this, the New York State School of Clay-Working and Ceramics was established at Alfred University following lobbying effort by Celadon executives and others. The presence of this school allowed the company to collaborate with leading ceramicists of the time such as Charles Fergus Binns, who did extensive consulting work with Celadon.

The Celadon Company purchased the Imperial Clay Company in 1905 and its factory in New Lexington, Ohio.

=== Ludowici-Celadon Company ===
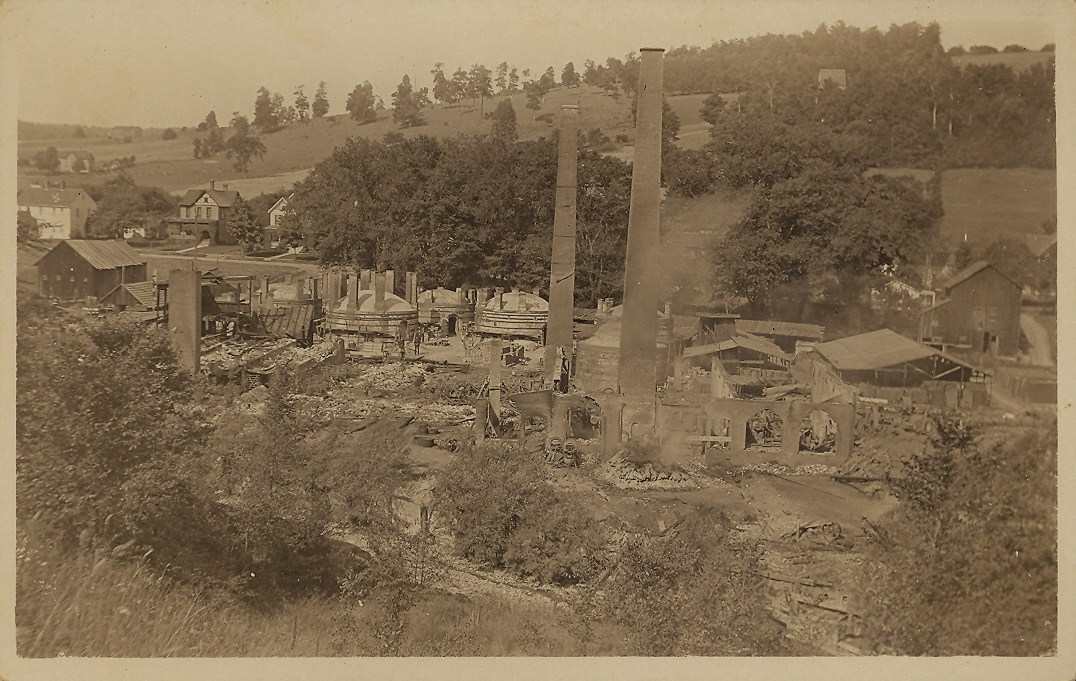
Remains of the Alfred, New York, factory after fire, December 1909

In 1906, the companies merged to form the Ludowici-Celadon Company. A plant in Coffeyville, Kansas, was purchased in 1908, and in 1909, the factory in Alfred, New York, burned to the ground. The company never rebuilt in the village, but the original Celadon Company office survived and remains there to this day.

The factory in Ludowici, Georgia, largely produced tiles for regional sales and had seen a decline in demand since completing tiles for the Panama Canal Zone. In October 1913, the factory closed, and the next month, the Ludowici-Celadon factory in Chicago Heights burned down, leaving the company with only its factories in New Lexington and Coffeyville.

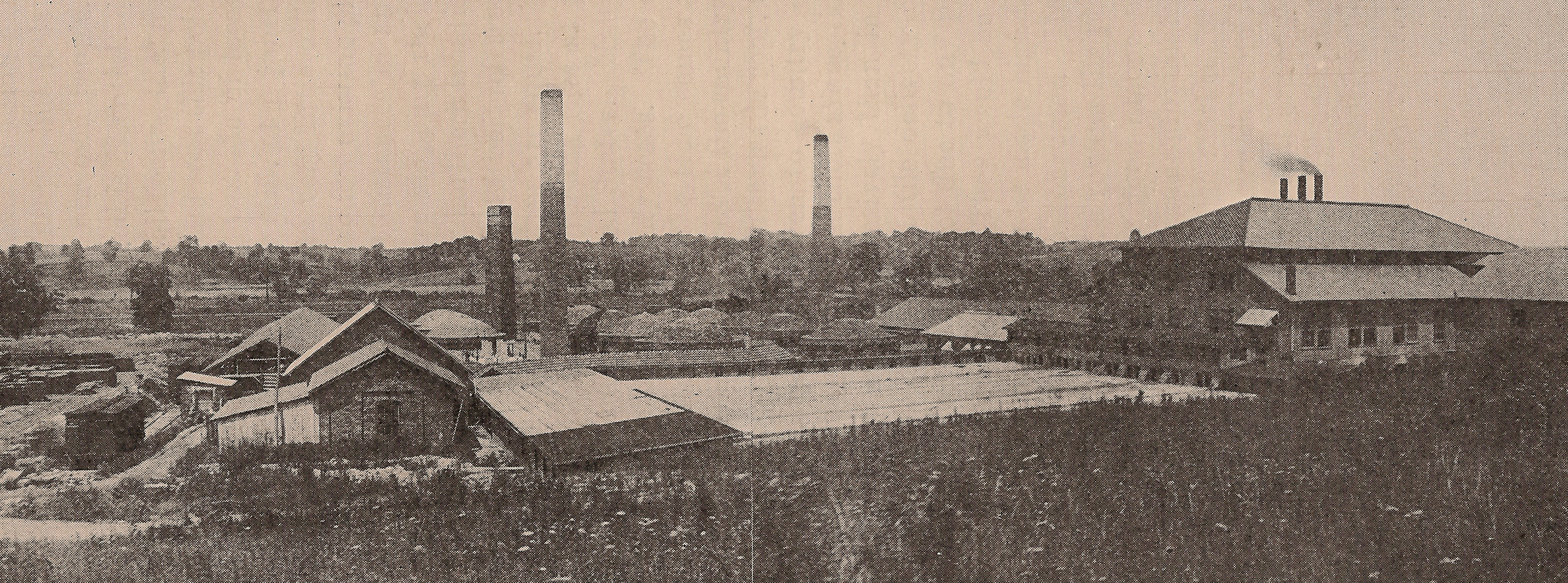
Ludowici-Celadon's New Lexington, Ohio, factory c. 1910

The company grew through the first quarter of the century and was helped by the popularity of traditional terra cotta in the architecture of the 1920s. Ludowici-Celadon tapped into this interest in 1929 by releasing The Tuileries Brochures, which contained articles written by prominent authors and architects such as Aymar Embury II, Frederick Ackerman, Jacques Carlu, and Hilaire Belloc.

During World War II, the company suffered a decline in domestic construction and supplemented its limited production of roof tile by temporarily opening pottery divisions in New Lexington and Coffeyville. Among other things, these produced licensed cookie jars for Walt Disney.

In 1956, the factory in Coffeyville, Kansas, was closed due to declining demand for terra cotta tile. In 1976, Ludowici-Celadon was acquired by CSC Inc. of Chicago. The company experienced growth in the 1980s, driven by a growing interest in historic restoration, and in 1986, it sponsored a competition and exhibit with the National Building Museum on architectural terra cotta ornamentation. CSC sold Ludowici-Celadon to CertainTeed, a division of Saint-Gobain, in 1989.

=== Ludowici Roof Tile ===
CertainTeed shortened Ludowici-Celadon's name to Ludowici Roof Tile in 1994. Around 2002, Ludowici's management was transferred from CertainTeed to Terreal, another Saint-Gobain subsidiary. When Terreal spun off from Saint-Gobain in 2003, Ludowici went with it.

Ludowici introduced wall cladding tile, and in 2007, it opened its first showroom in a renovated former shipping building at its New Lexington factory. A larger showroom was opened in Dallas, Texas, in 2019 to serve as a showcase for architects and designers in the area. The Ludowici Roof Tile Company Historic District was added to the National Register of Historic Places in 2021.

In 2024, Terreal and its subsidiaries were acquired by Wienerberger, and Ludowici's management transitioned to General Shale.

== Significant projects ==
Ludowici has created tiles for prominent buildings throughout the 19th, 20th, and 21st centuries, including the White House, the Pennsylvania State Capitol, the Plaza Hotel, the New York Life Building, the New York State Capitol, Wrigley Field and many buildings at Walt Disney World.

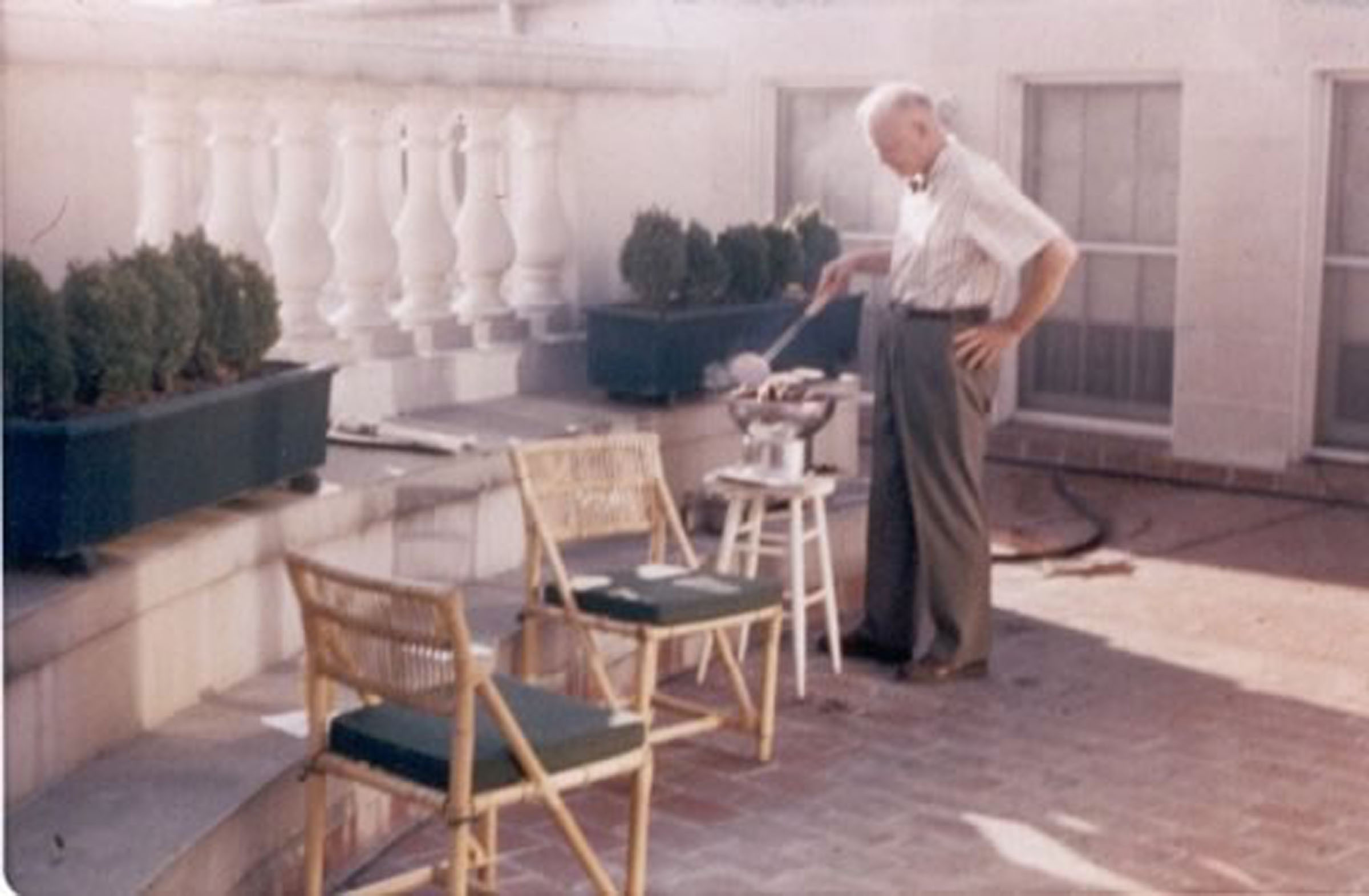
President Eisenhower standing on Ludowici tiles on the White House Promenade

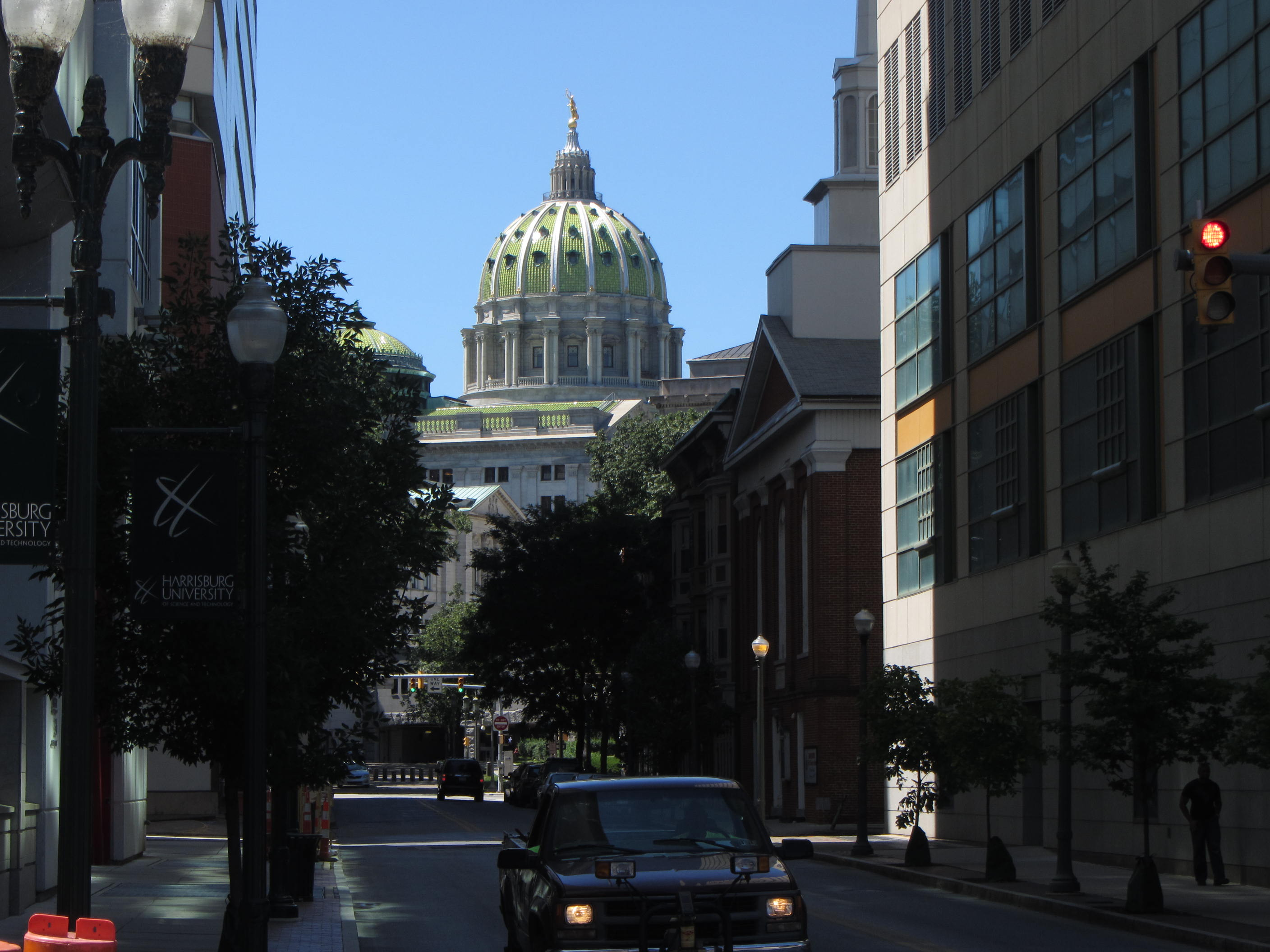
The Pennsylvania State Capitol with green Ludowici tiles on dome

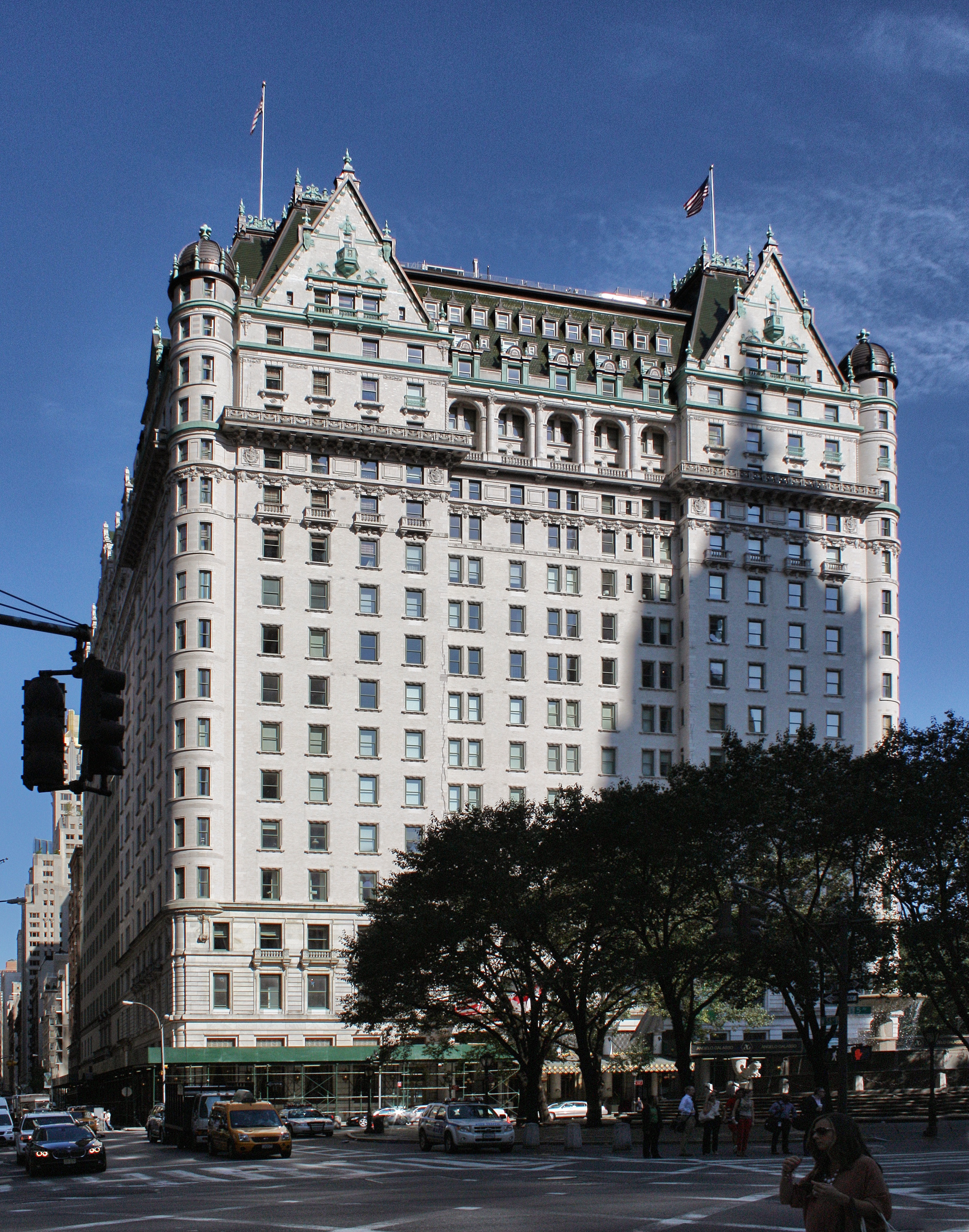
Ludowici tiles on New York City's Plaza Hotel

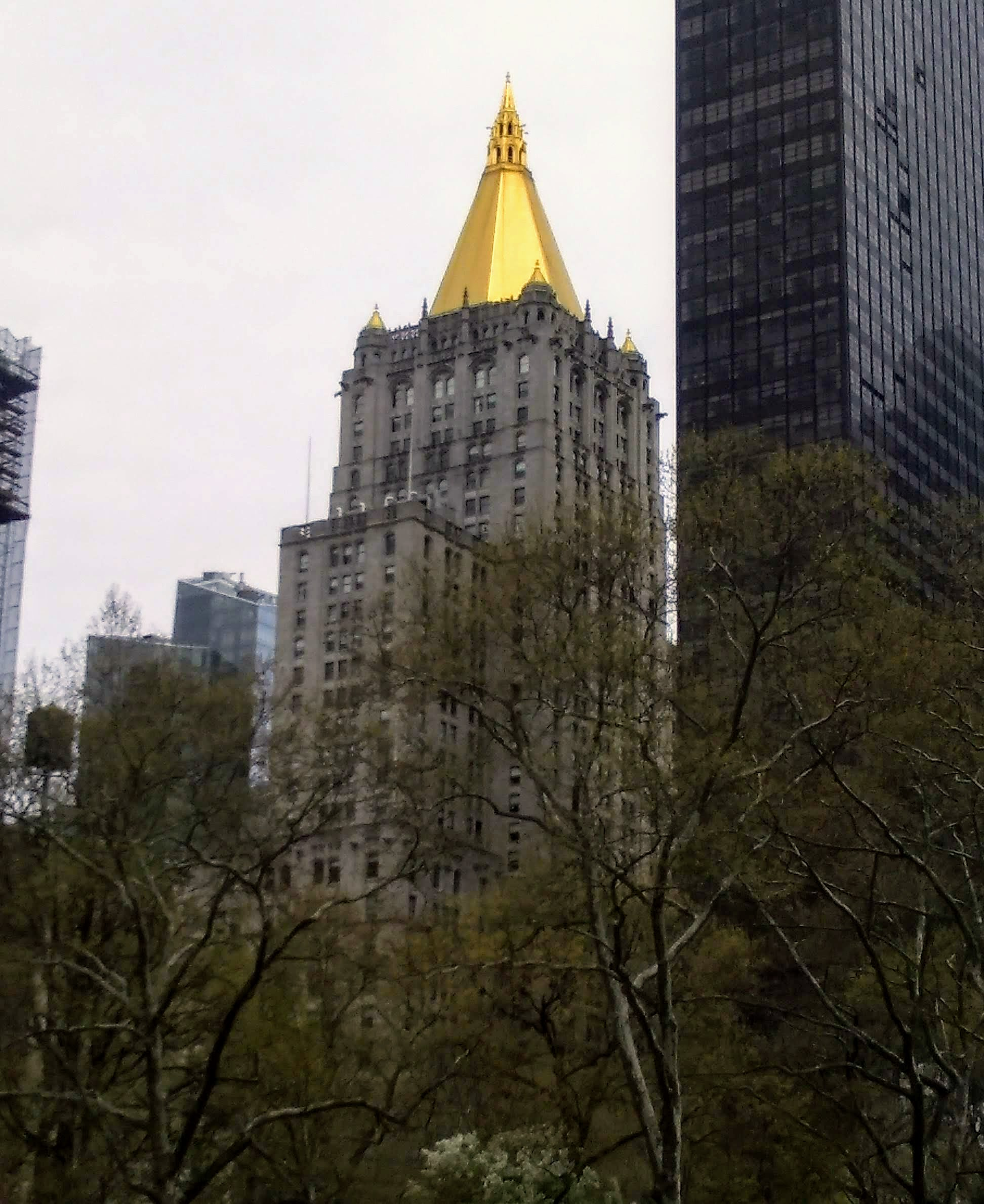
Ludowici tiles coated in gold on the New York Life Building

The New York State Capitol with Ludowici tiles on corner towers

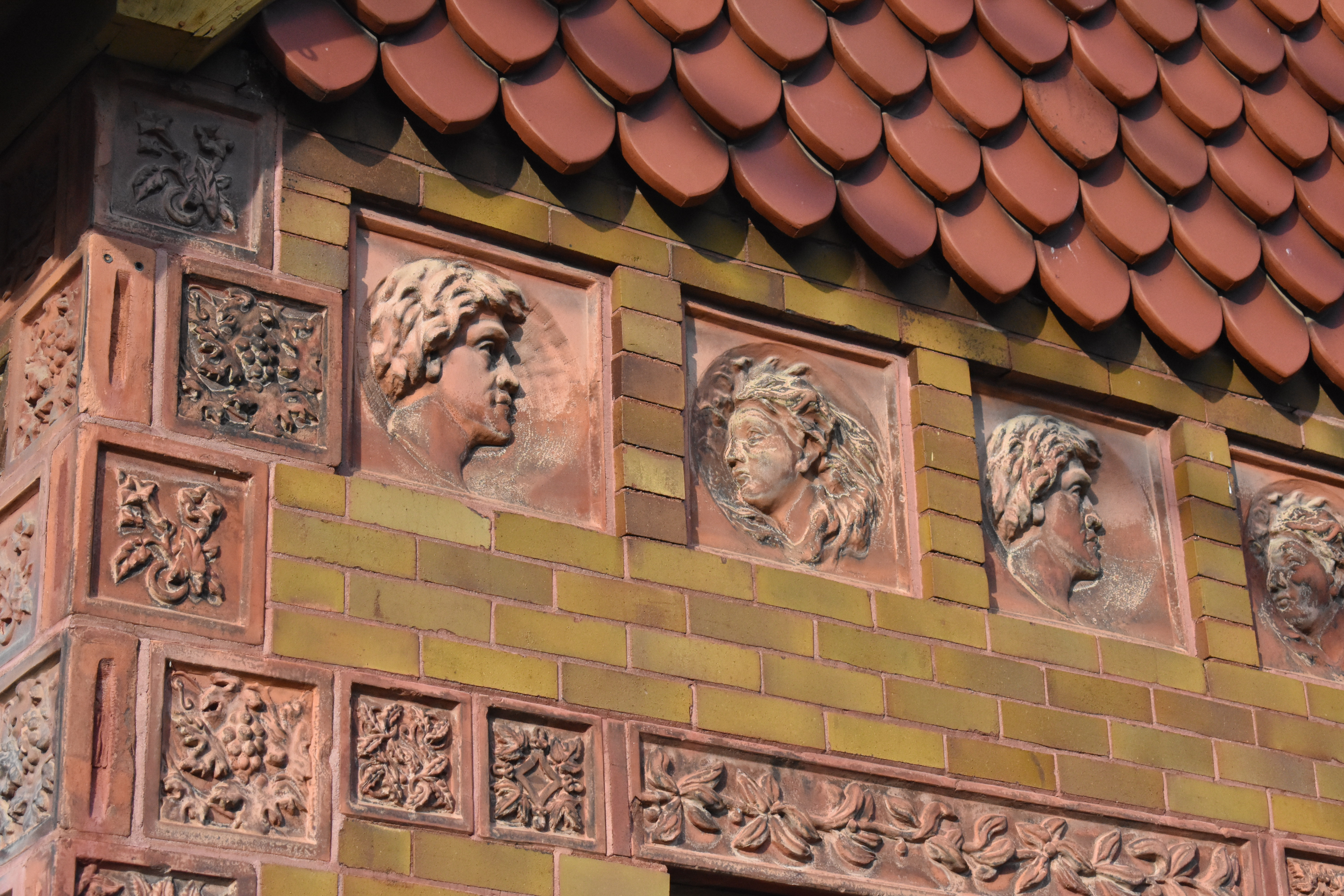
Close-up of terra cotta detailing on former Celadon office building in Alfred, New York

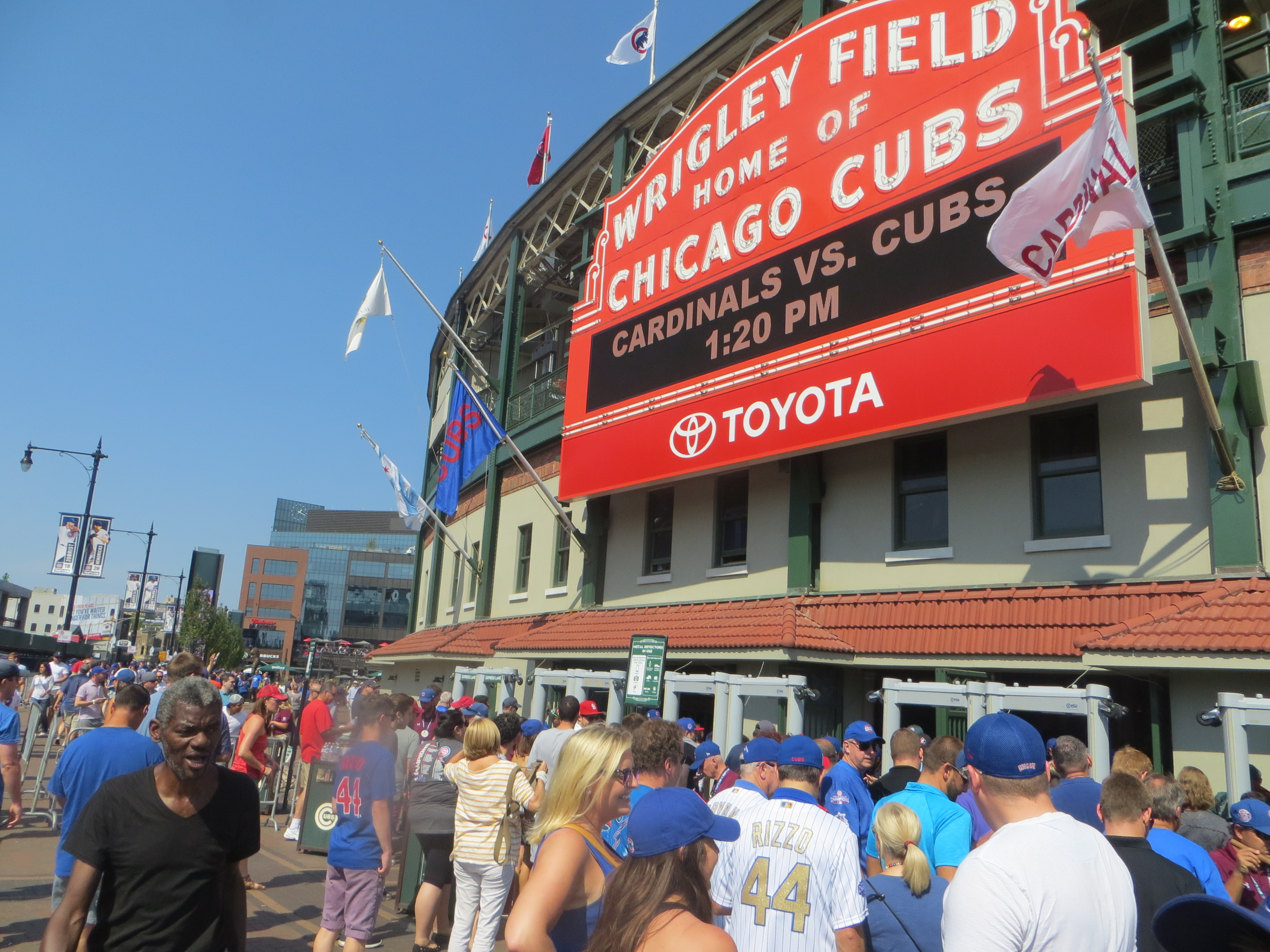
Ludowici tiles on the restored Wrigley Field stadium

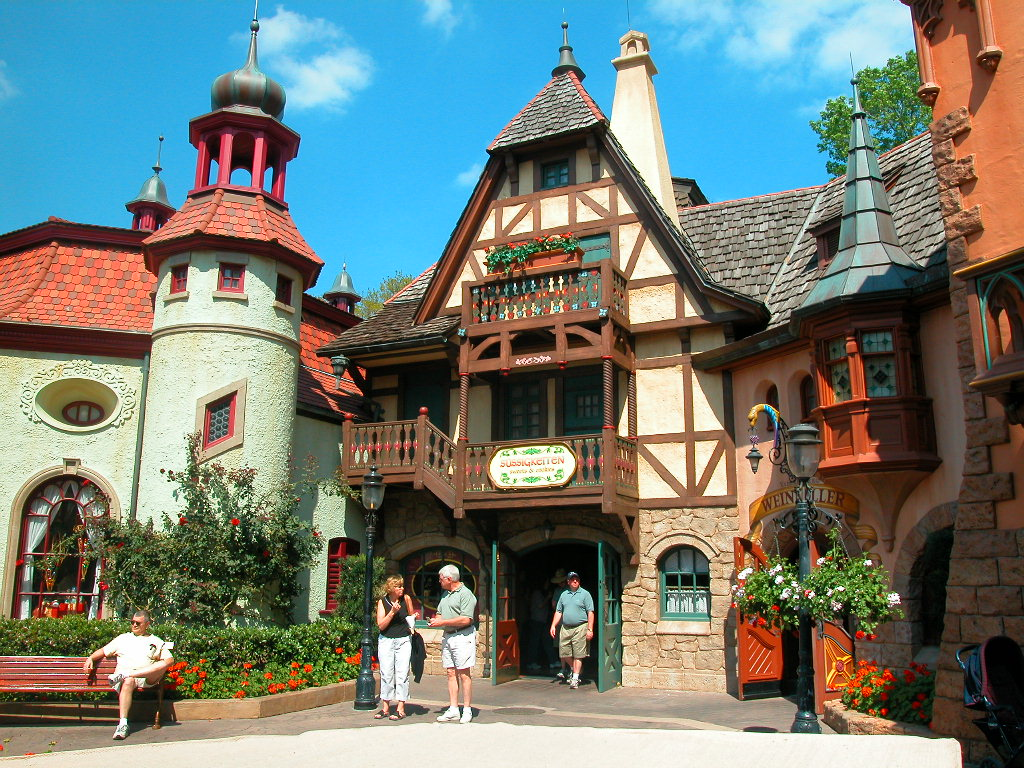
Ludowici tiles used in the Germany Pavilion of EPCOT at Walt Disney World

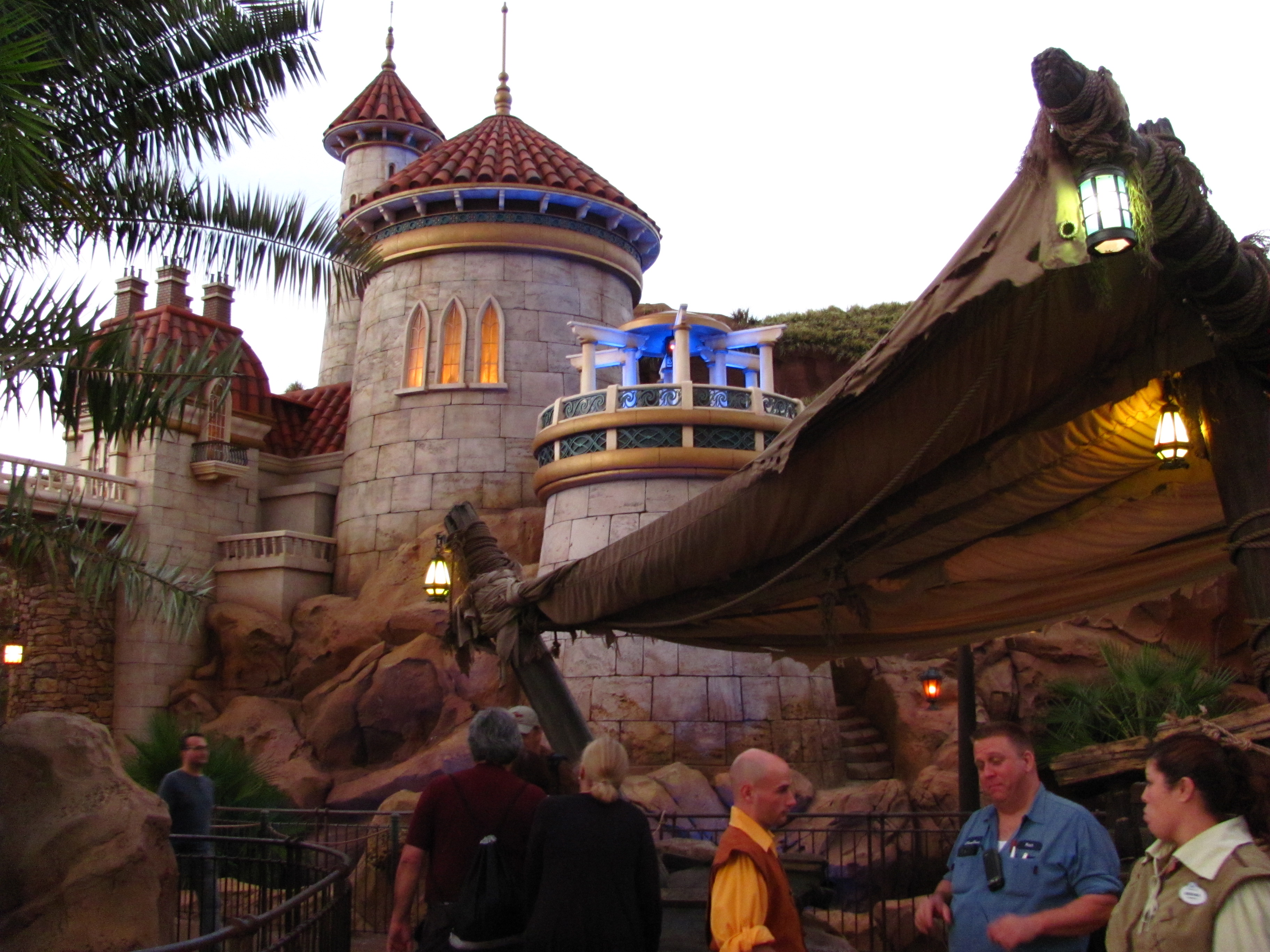
A Ludowici roof on The Little Mermaid: Ariel's Undersea Adventure at Walt Disney World

Basilica of the National Shrine of the Immaculate Conception in Washington, D.C. with colored Ludowici tiles on dome

== See also ==
- Terra Cotta Building (Alfred, New York)
- Ludowici, Georgia
- Ludowici Roof Tile Company Historic District
