= Somerset, Ohio =

- Village
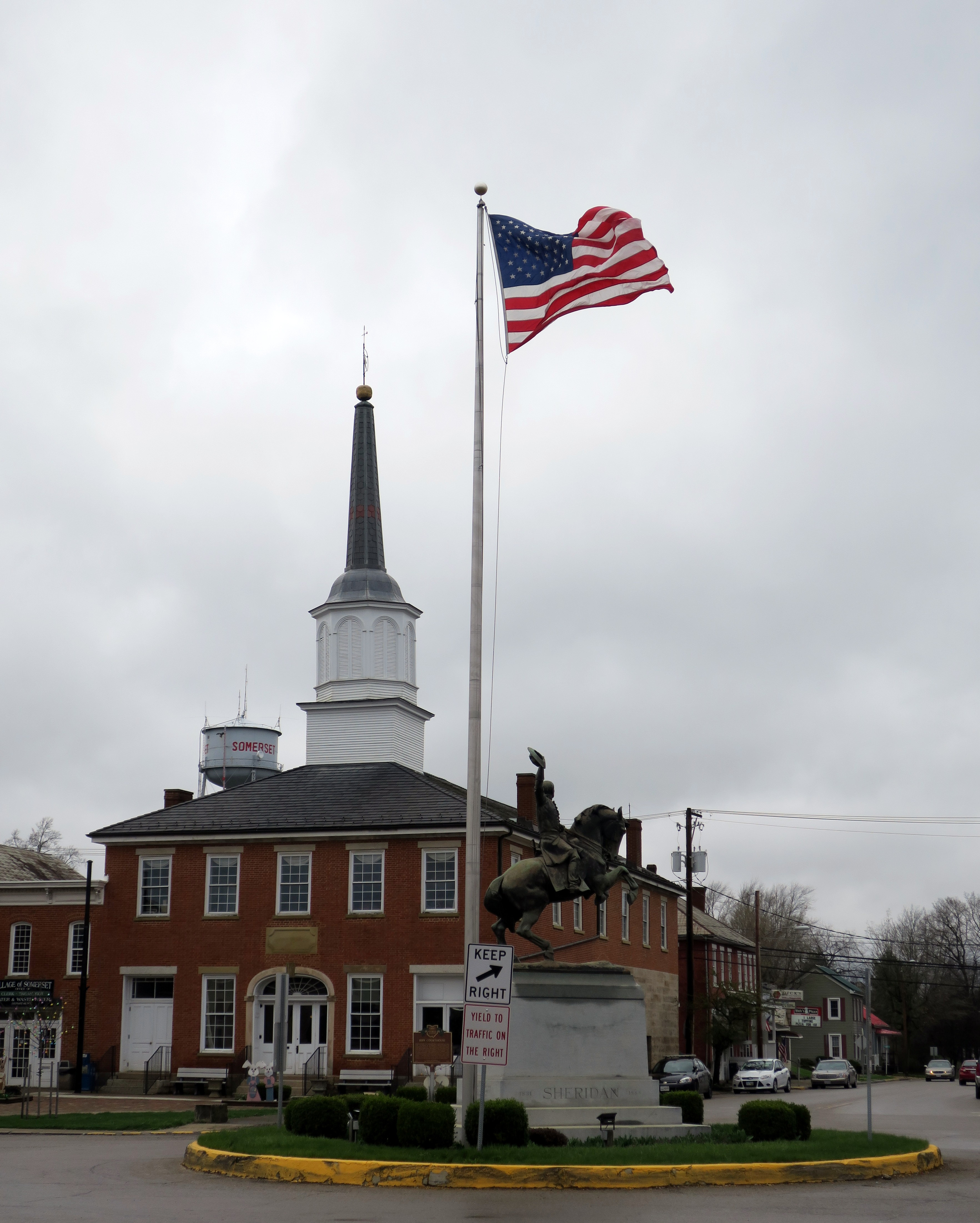
- Old Perry County Courthouse in Somerset

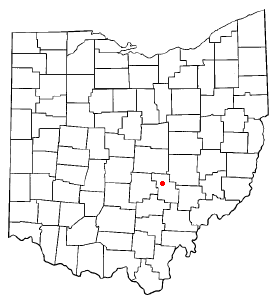
- Location of Somerset, Ohio

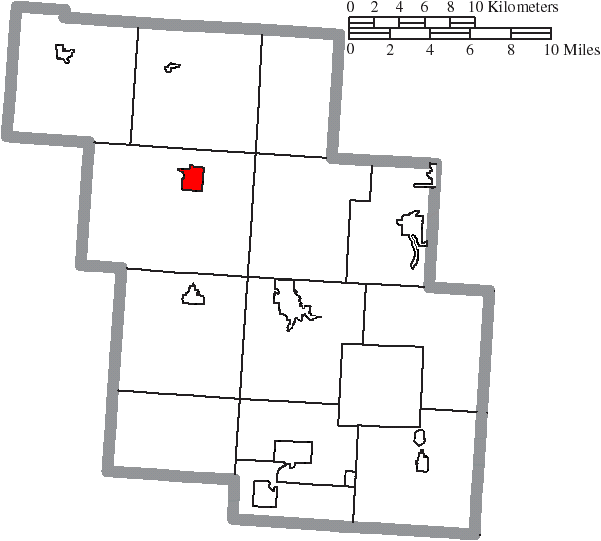
- Location of Somerset in Perry County
- Coordinates: 39°48′23″N 82°17′59″W
- Country: United States
- State: Ohio
- County: Perry

Government
  - Mayor: Eric Emmert
  - Police Chief: TJ Ross
  - Fire Chief: Eric Emmert

Area
  - Total: 1.17 sq mi (3.02 km^{2})
  - Land: 1.17 sq mi (3.02 km^{2})
  - Water: 0 sq mi (0.00 km^{2})
- Elevation: 1,076 ft (328 m)

Population (2020)
  - Total: 1,481
  - Density: 1,271.2/sq mi (490.83/km^{2})
- Time zone: UTC-5 (Eastern (EST))
  - Summer (DST): UTC-4 (EDT)
- ZIP code: 43783
- Area code: 740
- FIPS code: 39-72977
- GNIS feature ID: 2399836
- Website: www.somersetohio.org

Somerset is a village in Perry County, Ohio, United States. The population as of the 2020 census was 1,481. It is located 9.5 miles north of the county seat New Lexington and has a dedicated historical district. Saint Joseph Church, the oldest Catholic church in Ohio, is located just outside Somerset on State Route 383.

== History ==
The village of Somerset was established in 1807 by settlers from Somerset, Pennsylvania at the spot on Zane's Trace located midway between Lancaster and Zanesville. Seven years later, parts of Fairfield, Muskingum, and Washington counties were merged to create Perry County, and the house of a Somerset resident was named the first temporary courthouse. In 1819, the county government arranged for the erection of a purpose-built courthouse in Somerset; while most of the building was used for a jail, it also included a courtroom and space for some county offices. Ten years later, a permanent courthouse was constructed on the village's public square.

As the village of New Lexington grew in importance, its residents began to agitate for the county seat to be moved to their community. From 1851 to 1859, the state legislature passed three separate laws to permit the county seat to be moved; contentious elections and a decision by the Supreme Court of Ohio saw the county seat move to New Lexington, back to Somerset, and finally back to New Lexington. After it ceased to be used as a courthouse, the building was leased to Somerset for use as its village hall.

== Geography ==
According to the United States Census Bureau, the village has a total area of 1.2 square miles (3.11 km^{2}), all land.

== Demographics ==
Historical population
Census	Pop.	Note	%±
1820	344		—
1830	576		67.4%
1840	947		64.4%
1850	1,240		30.9%
1860	1,231		−0.7%
1870	1,153		−6.3%
1880	1,207		4.7%
1890	1,127		−6.6%
1900	1,124		−0.3%
1910	1,286		14.4%
1920	1,339		4.1%
1930	1,297		−3.1%
1940	1,352		4.2%
1950	1,383		2.3%
1960	1,361		−1.6%
1970	1,417		4.1%
1980	1,432		1.1%
1990	1,390		−2.9%
2000	1,549		11.4%
2010	1,481		−4.4%
2020	1,481		0.0%
U.S. Decennial Census

=== 2010 census ===
As of the census of 2010, there were 1,481 people, 613 households, and 354 families living in the village. The population density was 1,276.7 inhabitants per square mile (492.9/km^{2}). There were 673 housing units at an average density of 580.2 per square mile (224.0/km^{2}). The racial makeup of the village was 98.3% White, 0.3% African American, 0.1% Asian, 0.1% Pacific Islander, 0.1% from other races, and 1.1% from two or more races. Hispanic or Latino of any race were 0.6% of the population.

There were 613 households, of which 29.5% had children under the age of 18 living with them, 39.6% were married couples living together, 14.5% had a female householder with no husband present, 3.6% had a male householder with no wife present, and 42.3% were non-families. 37.7% of all households were made up of individuals, and 14.8% had someone living alone who was 65 years of age or older. The average household size was 2.31 and the average family size was 3.05.

The median age in the village was 41.1 years. 25.3% of residents were under the age of 18; 7.3% were between the ages of 18 and 24; 23.3% were from 25 to 44; 27.1% were from 45 to 64; and 17% were 65 years of age or older. The gender makeup of the village was 48.0% male and 52.0% female.

=== 2000 census ===
As of the census of 2000, there were 1,549 people, 613 households, and 381 families living in the village. The population density was 1,328.3 inhabitants per square mile (512.9/km^{2}). There were 659 housing units at an average density of 565.1 per square mile (218.2/km^{2}). The racial makeup of the village was 99.03% White, 0.45% Native American, 0.06% Asian, 0.19% from other races, and 0.26% from two or more races. Hispanic or Latino of any race were 0.26% of the population.

There were 613 households, out of which 31.5% had children under the age of 18 living with them, 47.3% were married couples living together, 10.8% had a female householder with no husband present, and 37.8% were non-families. 34.6% of all households were made up of individuals, and 18.9% had someone living alone who was 65 years of age or older. The average household size was 2.37 and the average family size was 3.05.

In the village, the population was spread out, with 25.7% under the age of 18, 6.8% from 18 to 24, 26.8% from 25 to 44, 19.6% from 45 to 64, and 21.1% who were 65 years of age or older. The median age was 39 years. For every 100 females there were 82.7 males. For every 100 females age 18 and over, there were 76.8 males.

The median income for a household in the village was $29,844, and the median income for a family was $39,231. Males had a median income of $30,994 versus $21,364 for females. The per capita income for the village was $14,209. About 6.4% of families and 12.8% of the population were below the poverty line, including 8.7% of those under age 18 and 20.0% of those age 65 or over.

== Education ==
Somerset is served by the Northern Local School District, which operates Somerset Elementary School in the village. Sheridan High School is located west of the village on State Route 13.

Holy Trinity Catholic School is located in Somerset.

Somerset has a public library, a branch of the Perry County District Library.

== Notable people ==
- William E. Birkhimer - Medal of Honor recipient during the Philippine Rebellion
- Jacob S. Bugh - Wisconsin State Assemblyman
- William A. Bugh - Wisconsin lawyer and Wisconsin State Assemblyman
- Tammie Green - professional golfer inducted into the Ohio Golf Hall of Fame
- Thomas Hood - Wisconsin state senator and jurist
- Philip Sheridan - Union general in the American Civil War.
