= George Herman Babcock =

American inventor (1832–1893)

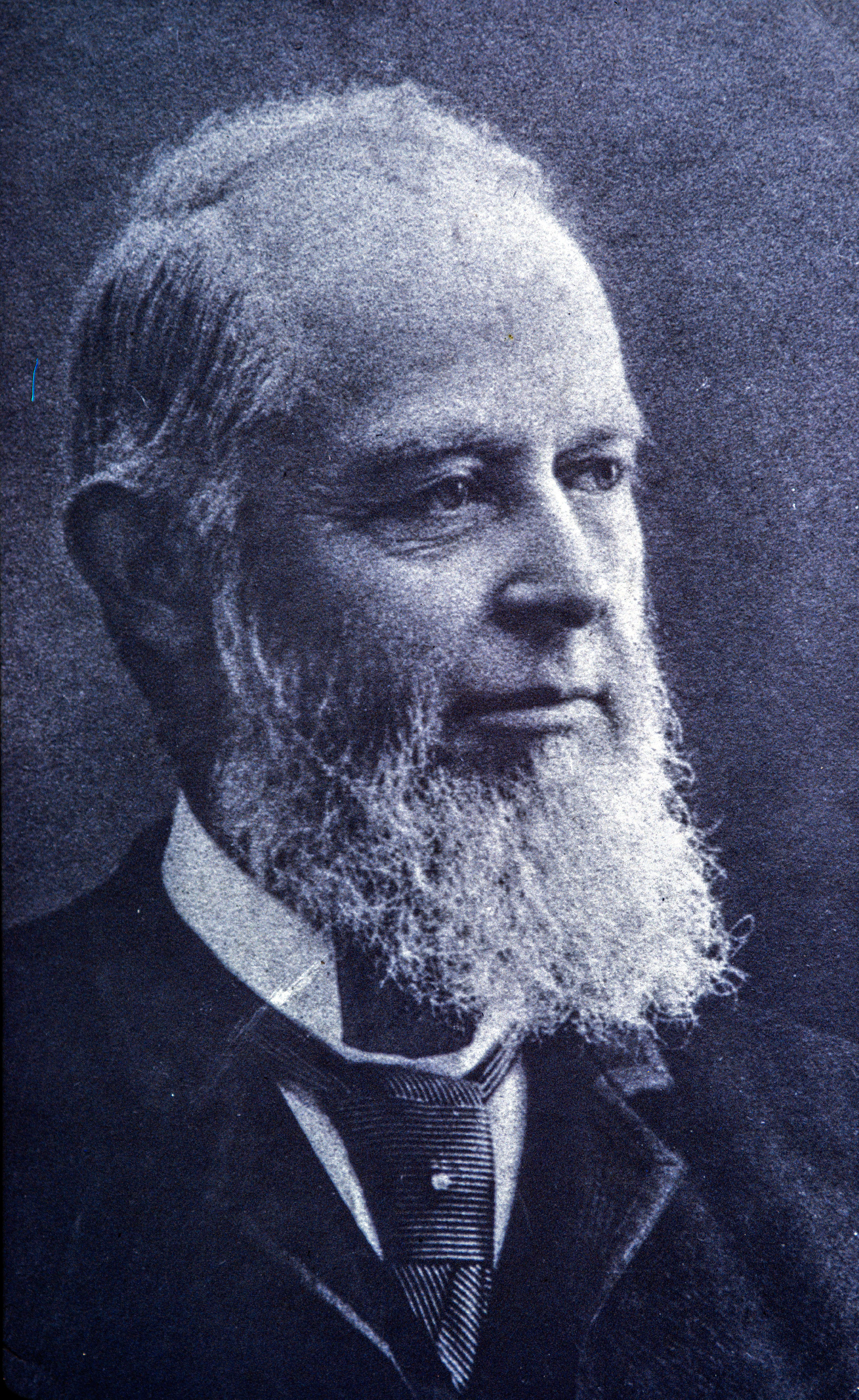
- Babcock in 1887
- Born: June 17, 1832; Unadilla Forks, New York, US
- Died: December 16, 1893 (aged 61); Plainfield, New Jersey, US
- Engineering career
- Significant advance: Co-inventor of an improved safety water tube boiler

George Herman Babcock (June 17, 1832 – December 16, 1893) was an American inventor. He and Stephen Wilcox co-invented a safer water tube steam boiler, and founded the Babcock & Wilcox boiler company.

== Biography ==
Babcock was born in Unadilla Forks, New York, in a family of inventors. As a boy he started his career in the woolen mill industry. When he was still in his teens he started a printing office in Westerly, Rhode Island. Here he founded the Literary Echo journal, which was later renamed The Narragansett and was continued until the end of the 19th century. Through his interest in photography, he started a printing-press manufacture, for which he invented a polychromatic press for printing in several colors.

After moving to New York Babcock taught mechanical drawing at the Cooper Institute. He was a draughtsman for the Mystic Iron Company and the Hope Iron Company in Providence. Here with Stephen Wilcox, he developed the Babcock and Wilcox engine, which was taken into production. Together they founded the Babcock & Wilcox boiler company in 1867, with Babcock as president and Wilcox as vice president.

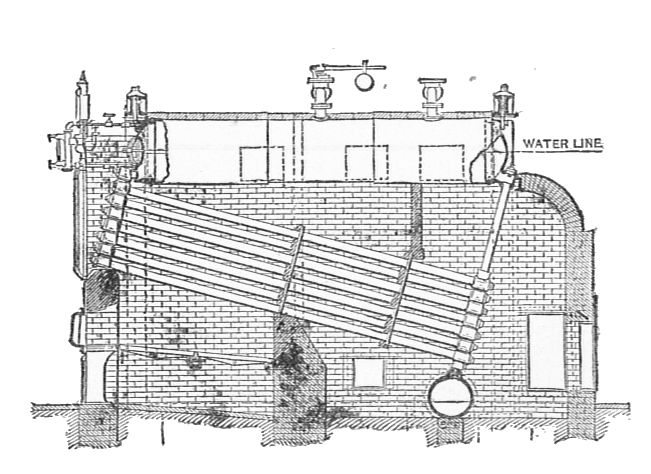
An early Babcock & Wilcox boiler design

Babcock's water tube steam boiler provided a safer and more efficient production of steam, and was built to work better under higher pressures than earlier boilers. In 1881, the first utility boiler manufactured by Babcock and Wilcox was installed. From 1886 to 1887, Babcock served as president of the American Society of Mechanical Engineers.

In 1889, Babcock was visiting a friend near Alfred, New York, and learned about the nearby Celadon Terra Cotta Company. He bought stock and soon became a majority shareholder, becoming company president in 1890. As president he took out sixteen patents for new clay roof tile designs, such as the Conosera tile pattern.

He died in Plainfield, New Jersey, on December 16, 1893.

== Legacy ==
In 1997, Babcock was inducted into the National Inventors Hall of Fame.
