= Nathaniel W. Milliken =

American politician

Nathaniel W. Milliken was a member of the Wisconsin State Assembly.

== Biography ==
Milliken was born on May 13, 1834, in Strong, Maine. He died on October 16, 1892.

== Career ==
Milliken was a member of the Assembly in 1882 as an Independent Republican. Additionally, he was Chairman of the Town Board (similar to city council), Town Treasurer and Postmaster of Saxeville, Wisconsin, and Sheriff and County Treasurer of Waushara County, Wisconsin.
