= New Lexington, Ohio =

- Village
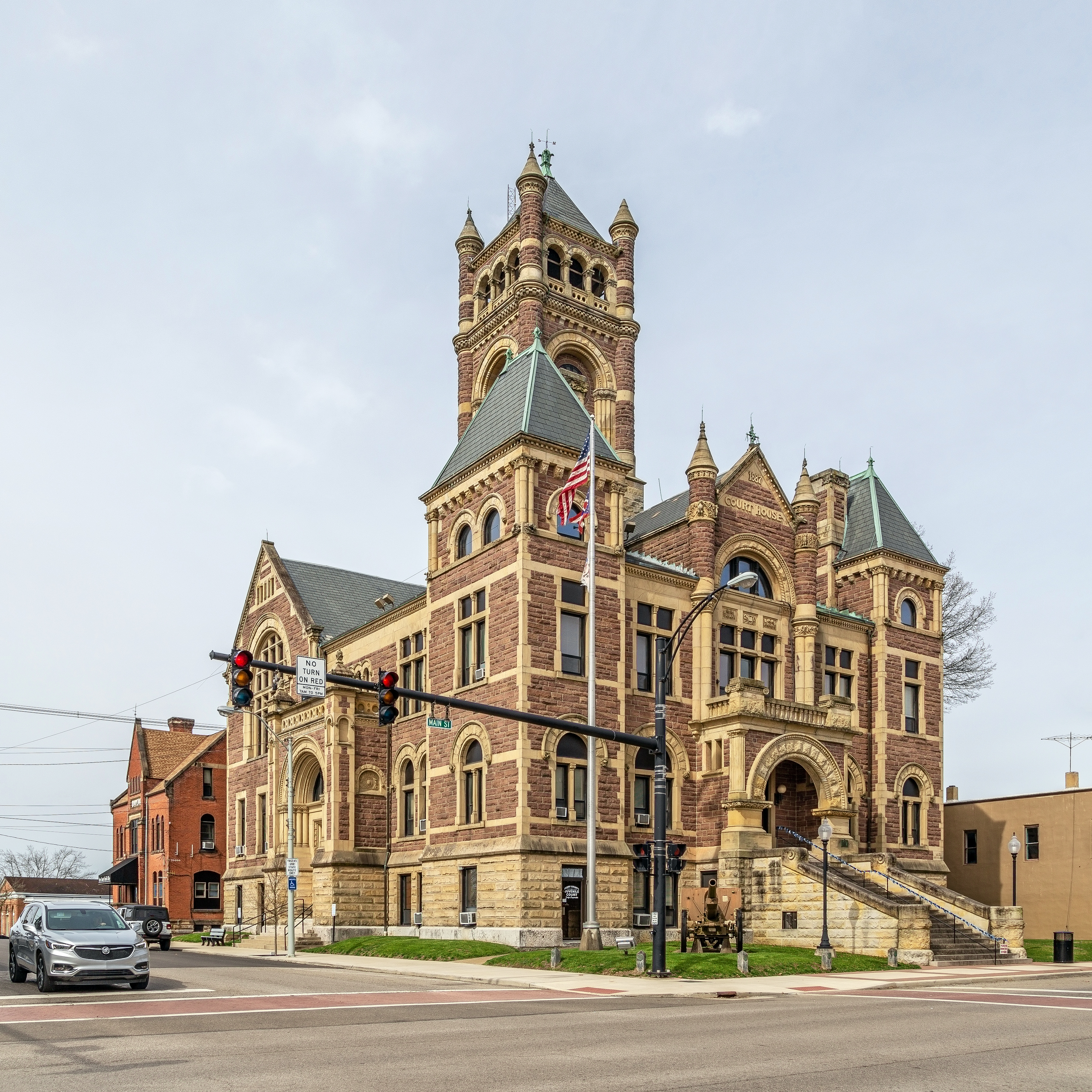
- Current Perry County Courthouse
- Motto: "Where Tradition Meets Progress"
- Interactive map of New Lexington, Ohio
- Location within Ohio Location within the United States
- Coordinates: 39°42′58″N 82°12′29″W
- Country: United States
- State: Ohio
- County: Perry

Government
  - Mayor: Trent Thompson (R)
  - Police Chief: Doug Gill
  - Council President: Janie DePinto

Area
  - Total: 1.95 sq mi (5.05 km^{2})
  - Land: 1.95 sq mi (5.04 km^{2})
  - Water: 0.0039 sq mi (0.01 km^{2})
- Elevation: 929 ft (283 m)

Population (2020)
  - Total: 4,435
  - Density: 2,277.4/sq mi (879.31/km^{2})
- Time zone: UTC-5 (Eastern (EST))
  - Summer (DST): UTC-4 (EDT)
- ZIP code: 43764
- Area code: 740
- FIPS code: 39-54866
- GNIS feature ID: 2399471
- Website: www.newlexingtonohio.gov

New Lexington is a village in and the county seat of Perry County, Ohio, United States, 21 miles (34 km) southwest of Zanesville and 45 miles (72 km) miles southeast of Columbus. The population was 4,435 at the 2020 census.

== History ==
=== Early history ===
The area around New Lexington and Perry County had been home to various indigenous groups for centuries prior to European settlement. Archeologists have found mounds and relics from groups such as the Adena and Hopewell cultures in areas near present-day New Lexington, most notably the Glenford Fort mound.

The Shawnee tribe lived across wide areas of Ohio including Perry County prior to the 1800s. After Tecumseh's defeat at the Battle of the Thames in 1813, many Shawnee were forced to relocate to present-day Oklahoma.

=== Settlement ===
New Lexington was first formally settled in 1817 by James Comly, though he was not conscious of it at the time. Comly had lived with his family near Circleville, and contracted malaria. He spent a long period of time bedridden by the disease, and when he eventually recovered he was surprised to find that he had apparently sold his home in Pickaway County and signed a deed for property in Perry County. The negotiations had been overseen by his mother and wife during his sickness, and despite his obliviousness to the property transfers Comly decided he was content with the sales.

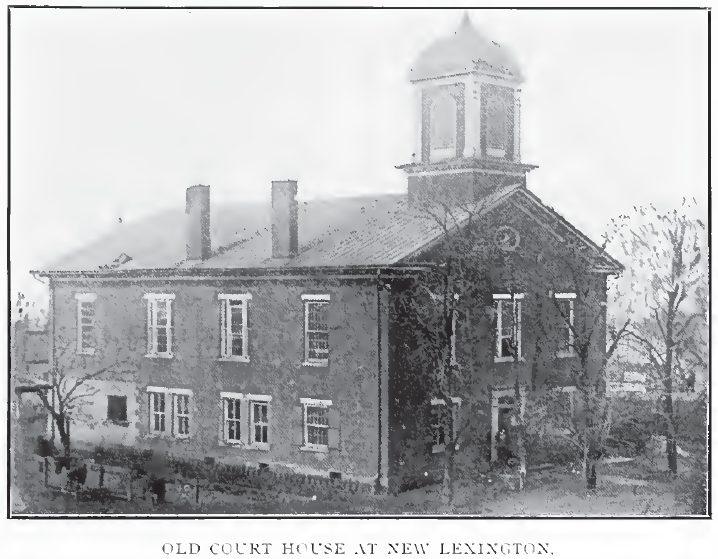
Previous courthouse in New Lexington

The village was named after Lexington, Massachusetts, and originally consisted of 64 lots, which Comly sold for prices ranging from $25 to $50 apiece. After the sale, the village began to grow and residents built houses and businesses including a tannery, hat shop, and tavern. A post office was first established in 1829.

For over two decades after the New Lexington's formation, it stayed close to the same size as when it was founded. After a bitter and hotly contested contest against the communities of Somerset and Rehoboth, New Lexington became the seat of Perry County in 1857. Beginning in the 1840s plots were added onto the village, and by the end of the century the village had more than quadrupled in population. New Lexington and its surrounding area became home to multiple industries, three newspapers, and two railroads.

Many residents of Perry County were passionate supporters of the Union cause, and large numbers of people from New Lexington fought for the United States during the American Civil War. General Philip Sheridan's horse Rienzi was from New Lexington.

New Lexington was severely damaged by a fire in February 1874, which originated in a drug store around midnight. The flames quickly spread to the second floor of the drug store, and then inflamed several more buildings, before igniting an entire block of structures. Townspeople hurried to tear down a one-story building by a wide alleyway, preventing the flames from catching a further row of houses and stopping the spread. After that point, the damage was more limited and no more buildings were lost. In the end, total damages from the fire were estimated at $50,000.

In 1887 the Perry County Courthouse was erected to replace the smaller building used previously. After completion, it stood vacant for a few years before offices were opened inside.

=== Industry ===
New Lexington and its surrounding regions are within the Clay Belt of Ohio, and it was once home to numerous ceramic industries. Ludowici Roof Tile has operated a factory in New Lexington since 1902, and has produced tile at this location for projects including Walt Disney World, Ellis Island, and the White House.

Star Manufacturing was founded in New Lexington in 1871 as a small foundry for making feed grinders, stoves, plows, and other items. Starting in the 1880s they branched into production of mine cars for the area's coal industry. Over time the company grew to focus on grinders, engines, and mining equipment. In 1941 the company and its factory were bought and turned into STAR Engineering, which designs and builds equipment for ceramic manufacturers. As of 2025, this company continues to work as a manufacturer of custom machines for the ceramic industry.

In 2025 it was announced that the village's Cooper-Standard Automotive manufacturing plant would be closing in early 2027 after 50 years of operation, putting an estimated 200 to 275 employees out of work.

== Geography ==
According to the United States Census Bureau, the village has a total area of 1.95 square miles (5.05 km^{2}), all land.

=== Climate ===
Climate data for New Lexington, Ohio (1991–2020 normals, extremes 1942–present)
Month	Jan	Feb	Mar	Apr	May	Jun	Jul	Aug	Sep	Oct	Nov	Dec	Year
Record high °F (°C)	75 (24)	78 (26)	86 (30)	102 (39)	94 (34)	100 (38)	103 (39)	100 (38)	101 (38)	91 (33)	88 (31)	77 (25)	103 (39)
Mean daily maximum °F (°C)	37.1 (2.8)	40.5 (4.7)	50.6 (10.3)	63.9 (17.7)	72.8 (22.7)	80.2 (26.8)	83.4 (28.6)	82.6 (28.1)	76.8 (24.9)	65.3 (18.5)	52.8 (11.6)	41.7 (5.4)	62.3 (16.8)
Daily mean °F (°C)	27.4 (−2.6)	30.1 (−1.1)	38.8 (3.8)	50.1 (10.1)	60.0 (15.6)	68.3 (20.2)	72.1 (22.3)	70.8 (21.6)	64.2 (17.9)	52.5 (11.4)	41.2 (5.1)	32.6 (0.3)	50.7 (10.4)
Mean daily minimum °F (°C)	17.7 (−7.9)	19.6 (−6.9)	27.0 (−2.8)	36.4 (2.4)	47.2 (8.4)	56.5 (13.6)	60.8 (16.0)	59.0 (15.0)	51.6 (10.9)	39.7 (4.3)	29.7 (−1.3)	23.5 (−4.7)	39.1 (3.9)
Record low °F (°C)	−35 (−37)	−26 (−32)	−12 (−24)	10 (−12)	22 (−6)	32 (0)	40 (4)	36 (2)	24 (−4)	14 (−10)	−12 (−24)	−24 (−31)	−35 (−37)
Average precipitation inches (mm)	3.35 (85)	2.72 (69)	3.84 (98)	4.36 (111)	4.34 (110)	4.92 (125)	4.55 (116)	3.31 (84)	3.20 (81)	3.26 (83)	3.21 (82)	3.29 (84)	44.35 (1,126)
Average snowfall inches (cm)	8.6 (22)	5.3 (13)	2.8 (7.1)	0.1 (0.25)	0.0 (0.0)	0.0 (0.0)	0.0 (0.0)	0.0 (0.0)	0.0 (0.0)	0.0 (0.0)	0.4 (1.0)	3.0 (7.6)	20.2 (51)
Average precipitation days (≥ 0.01 in)	13.5	11.3	11.9	12.1	13.4	11.7	11.1	9.6	8.7	10.2	10.3	13.4	137.2
Average snowy days (≥ 0.1 in)	5.5	3.9	2.2	0.1	0.0	0.0	0.0	0.0	0.0	0.0	0.5	2.7	14.9
Source: NOAA

== Demographics ==
Historical population
Census	Pop.	Note	%±
1850	406		—
1860	812		100.0%
1870	953		17.4%
1880	1,357		42.4%
1890	1,470		8.3%
1900	1,701		15.7%
1910	2,559		50.4%
1920	3,157		23.4%
1930	3,901		23.6%
1940	4,049		3.8%
1950	4,233		4.5%
1960	4,514		6.6%
1970	4,921		9.0%
1980	5,179		5.2%
1990	5,117		−1.2%
2000	4,689		−8.4%
2010	4,731		0.9%
2020	4,435		−6.3%
U.S. Decennial Census

=== 2020 census ===
As of the 2020 census, New Lexington had a population of 4,435. The median age was 35.9 years. 25.8% of residents were under the age of 18 and 17.0% of residents were 65 years of age or older. For every 100 females there were 92.0 males, and for every 100 females age 18 and over there were 88.3 males age 18 and over.

99.9% of residents lived in urban areas, while 0.1% lived in rural areas.

There were 1,773 households in New Lexington, of which 33.1% had children under the age of 18 living in them. Of all households, 36.5% were married-couple households, 19.5% were households with a male householder and no spouse or partner present, and 32.6% were households with a female householder and no spouse or partner present. About 32.7% of all households were made up of individuals and 14.2% had someone living alone who was 65 years of age or older.

There were 1,977 housing units, of which 10.3% were vacant. The homeowner vacancy rate was 1.5% and the rental vacancy rate was 6.4%.

Racial composition as of the 2020 census
Race	Number	Percent
White	4,201	94.7%
Black or African American	14	0.3%
American Indian and Alaska Native	15	0.3%
Asian	18	0.4%
Native Hawaiian and Other Pacific Islander	0	0.0%
Some other race	8	0.2%
Two or more races	179	4.0%
Hispanic or Latino (of any race)	49	1.1%

=== 2010 census ===
As of the census of 2010, there were 4,731 people, 1,838 households, and 1,164 families living in the village. The population density was 2,426.2 inhabitants per square mile (936.8/km^{2}). There were 2,000 housing units at an average density of 1,025.6 per square mile (396.0/km^{2}). The racial makeup of the village was 97.9% White, 0.5% African American, 0.2% Native American, 0.1% Asian, 0.1% Pacific Islander, 0.1% from other races, and 1.1% from two or more races. Hispanic or Latino of any race were 0.6% of the population.

There were 1,838 households, of which 36.3% had children under the age of 18 living with them, 39.9% were married couples living together, 17.8% had a female householder with no husband present, 5.6% had a male householder with no wife present, and 36.7% were non-families. 30.6% of all households were made up of individuals, and 11.1% had someone living alone who was 65 years of age or older. The average household size was 2.53 and the average family size was 3.12.

The median age in the village was 33.8 years. 28.2% of residents were under the age of 18; 9.1% were between the ages of 18 and 24; 26.3% were from 25 to 44; 23.3% were from 45 to 64; and 13.3% were 65 years of age or older. The gender makeup of the village was 47.3% male and 52.7% female.

=== 2000 census ===
As of the census of 2000, there were 4,689 people, 1,836 households, and 1,233 families living in the village. The population density was 2,017.1 inhabitants per square mile (778.8/km^{2}). There were 1,976 housing units at an average density of 850.0 per square mile (328.2/km^{2}). The racial makeup of the village was 98.76% White, 0.17% African American, 0.23% Native American, 0.13% Asian, 0.04% Pacific Islander, 0.13% from other races, and 0.53% from two or more races. Hispanic or Latino of any race were 0.38% of the population.

There were 1,836 households, out of which 35.2% had children under the age of 18 living with them, 48.5% were married couples living together, 13.5% had a female householder with no husband present, and 32.8% were non-families. 28.6% of all households were made up of individuals, and 12.9% had someone living alone who was 65 years of age or older. The average household size was 2.50 and the average family size was 3.07.

In the village, the population was spread out, with 28.1% under the age of 18, 10.4% from 18 to 24, 26.6% from 25 to 44, 19.5% from 45 to 64, and 15.5% who were 65 years of age or older. The median age was 33 years. For every 100 females there were 91.3 males. For every 100 females age 18 and over, there were 85.9 males.

The median income for a household in the village was $28,406, and the median income for a family was $33,514. Males had a median income of $28,155 versus $21,039 for females. The per capita income for the village was $14,127. About 16.4% of families and 17.6% of the population were below the poverty line, including 27.0% of those under age 18 and 11.2% of those age 65 or over.

== Government ==
As of 2026, the mayor of New Lexington is Trent Thompson. The Village Administrator is Eric Emmert. Janie DePinto serves as the council president.

== Education ==
New Lexington City School District operates New Lexington Elementary, Junction City Elementary, New Lexington Middle School, and New Lexington High School.

New Lexington has a public library, a branch of the Perry County District Library.

== Infrastructure ==
=== Transportation ===
The Perry County Airport is located two nautical miles (2.3 mi; 3.7 km) south of New Lexington's central business district.

== Notable people ==
- William A. Calderhead, U.S. Representative from Kansas
- James M. Comly, brigadier general in Union Army, journalist, attorney and diplomat
- Dan Dodd, member of the Ohio House of Representatives
- Stephen Benton Elkins, industrialist and politician
- William C. Grimes, acting Governor of Oklahoma Territory
- Januarius MacGahan, journalist and national hero of Bulgaria
- Jerry McGee, professional golfer
- John A. McShane, first Democrat elected to United States House of Representatives from Nebraska
- Albert Francis Zahm, specialist in aerodynamics; early aircraft experimenter
- John Augustine Zahm, Holy Cross priest and scientist
- Gene Cole, Olympic medalist and sprinter
