= National Register of Historic Places listings in Lafayette County, Wisconsin =

Location of Lafayette County in Wisconsin

This is a list of the National Register of Historic Places listings in Lafayette County, Wisconsin. It is intended to provide a comprehensive listing of entries in the National Register of Historic Places that are located in Lafayette County, Wisconsin. The locations of National Register properties for which the latitude and longitude coordinates are included below may be seen in a map.

There are 13 properties and districts listed on the National Register in the county.

This National Park Service list is complete through NPS recent listings posted May 1, 2026.

== Current listings ==
	Name on the Register	Image	Date listed	Location	City or town	Description
1	Benton Stone Water Tower	Benton Stone Water Tower	January 7, 1999 (#98001598)	49 Water St. 42°34′15″N 90°22′58″W	Benton	67-foot limestone water tower, now topped with a steel tank. Built after an 1899 fire convinced the community that it needed a "waterworks" system.
2	Darlington Carnegie Free Library		May 2, 2022 (#100007661)	525 Main St. 42°40′53″N 90°07′02″W	Darlington	Carnegie library designed by Claude & Starck in Tudor Revival style and built in 1905. Along with books, housed meetings, city council, lectures and polling place.
3	First Capitol	First Capitol	April 28, 1970 (#70000036)	North of Belmont off U.S. 151; 42°46′07″N 90°21′45″W	Belmont	The first capitol of Wisconsin Territory, built by John Atchison in 1836 to promote his proposed town. The territorial legislature met there for one session, then moved to warmer and less-remote quarters.
4	Gratiot House	Gratiot House	January 8, 1980 (#80000153)	South of Shullsburg on Rennick Rd. 42°33′09″N 90°13′52″W	Shullsburg	Georgian-styled limestone house built by Henry Gratiot in 1835. Last remaining building of Gratiot Grove, one of the state's first settlements, a lead-mining outpost begun in Winnebago territory in 1826 on the stage road from Galena to Chicago.
5	Lafayette County Courthouse	Lafayette County Courthouse	December 22, 1978 (#78000114)	626 Main St. 42°40′57″N 90°07′06″W	Darlington	Neoclassical courthouse built in 1905, funded by Matt Murphy of Benton.
6	Main Street Historic District	Main Street Historic District	October 7, 1994 (#94001210)	Roughly bounded by Main, Ann, Louisa and Wells Sts. 42°40′46″N 90°07′04″W	Darlington	Darlington's old downtown, including the 1860 J.B. Cutting Livery Stable, the 1879 Italianate-styled Schreiter Building, the 1883 Romanesque Revival Driver's Store and Opera House, the 1896 Queen Anne Miller and Fardy Dry Goods Store, the 1911 Neoclassical Odd Fellows Hall, the 1919 Commercial Vernacular Hotel Olson, and the 1930 Moderne-style Iowa Oil Co. & Filling Station.
7	Mottley Family Farmstead	Mottley Family Farmstead	May 25, 2001 (#01000564)	21496 Ivey Rd. 42°48′14″N 90°08′45″W	Willow Springs	Abandoned farm on an isolated ravine, begun in 1854 by English immigrants Abraham and Susan Motley. Remaining are 1.5 story limestone farmhouse probably begun around 1860, bank barn, and other structures. The Motleys raised milk cows, pigs, wheat, corn and potatoes. The farm stayed in their family until 1972.
8	Pecatonica Battlefield	Pecatonica Battlefield	July 28, 2011 (#11000488)	2995 County Road Y 42°39′41″N 89°52′36″W	Wiota	Site where Colonel Dodge's militia defeated a party of Kickapoo warriors, a turning point in the Black Hawk War.
9	Prairie Spring Hotel	Prairie Spring Hotel	October 21, 1999 (#99001273)	WI 23 South; 42°48′02″N 90°07′56″W	Willow Springs	Fine 2-story I-house built in 1833 as a hotel on the military road from Mineral Point to Galena, when most other buildings in the lead-mining area were much simpler.
10	St. Augustine Church	St. Augustine Church	February 23, 1972 (#72000057)	Off County Road W 42°31′59″N 90°20′01″W	New Diggings	Early Catholic church built in 1844 during lead-mining days, designed by pioneer priest Father Mazzuchelli.
11	Star Theatre	Star Theatre	November 7, 1980 (#80000154)	200 S. North St. 42°41′59″N 89°52′02″W	Argyle	Woodworking shop downstairs and community hall upstairs, built by carpenter Alanson Partridge in 1878 and 1881. Used as a movie theater from 1920 into the 40s.
12	Water Street Commercial Historic District	Water Street Commercial Historic District	June 28, 1990 (#90000998)	Roughly Water St. from Judgement to Kennedy Sts. and Gratiot St. from Water to Church Sts. 42°34′32″N 90°14′20″W	Shullsburg	Shullsburg's downtown, both now and during early lead-mining. Properties include the 1847/78/84 City Hotel, the 1855/1886 Brewster House Hotel, the 1867 Greek Revival Methodist Episcopal Church, 1882 Copeland Opera House, the 1884 Italianate Merchants Union Bank, the 1884 Gothic Revival/eclectic Williams Estate Building, the 1903 Gerlach Saloon, and the 1920 20th Century Commercial-styled Gem Garage.
13	Daniel and Catherine Welty Barn		April 10, 2024 (#100010205)	11736 Fork Road; 42°39′51″N 89°59′40″W	Darlington	"Ground barn" built around 1850 with timber frame and load-bearing masonry pierced by ventilation slits. The Weltys used the barn to thresh the wheat they grew.

== See also ==
- List of National Historic Landmarks in Wisconsin
- National Register of Historic Places listings in Wisconsin
- Listings in neighboring counties: Grant, Green, Iowa, Jo Daviess (IL), Stephenson (IL)
