= Susie Forrest Swift =

Sister M. Imelda Teresa
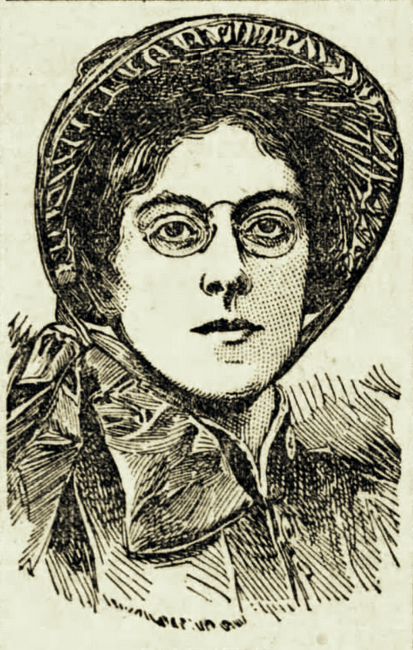
- Major Susie Swift

Personal life
- Born: Susie Teresa Forrest Swift; June 10, 1862 Amenia, New York
- Died: April 19, 1916 (aged 53) Sinsinawa, Wisconsin
- Children: 1 adopted daughter
- Education: Vassar College

Religious life
- Religion: Roman Catholic
- Order: Dominican
- Profession: Catholic nun

Senior posting
- Previous post: Salvation Army officer

Susie Forrest Swift (later, Sister M. Imelda Teresa, O.P.; June 10, 1862 – April 19, 1916) was an American Salvationist, and later, after converting to Catholicism, a Dominican nun. In both roles, she worked as a magazine editor.

== Early life and education ==
Susie Teresa (Note: According to Winston & Winston (2009), Susie's second name was Terrell.) Forrest Swift was born in Amenia, New York, June 10, 1862. Her parents, George Henry Paine, a lawyer, and Pamela (Forrest) Paine, were wealthy.

She was educated at Hillside Seminary, Bridgeport, Connecticut; and Vassar College (A.B., 1883), Poughkeepsie, New York, where she was a member of her college Phi Beta Kappa society.

She developed a strong taste for literature, and while still in school, acquired an easy and graceful style of writing.

Swift came to believe that the then-existent system of awarding college honors at Vassar was unfair, and that it invariably led to deception, and sometimes fraud among the candidates, and so while yet an undergraduate, set herself to agitate for its reform. She was besought to wait and do this as a post-graduate when, as an undoubted "honor girl" she could speak more decisively.

== Career ==
Swift was a teacher in Morristown, New Jersey, 1883–84.

Immediately after graduation, Swift, with her older sister, (Note: According to The Saint Paul Globe (1897), the father accompanied the two daughters.) Elizabeth Swift Brengle (1849–1915), sailed for Europe with a view to writing magazine articles, for both had decided to devote their lives to literary work. She worked as a journalist in London, 1884–85.

=== Salvation Army officer ===
While in Scotland, just for the fun of it, and possibly with a view of getting material for a story, the sisters decided on evening to attend a Salvation Army meeting in the slums of one of the larger towns, and that they might not attract too much attention, dressed themselves very plainly. The meeting was largely attended by rough men, and so abusive were they to the young woman in charge that the sympathies of Elizabeth were aroused, and without thinking of possible consequences and almost without the exercise of conscious volition upon her part, the sprange from her seat, went to the platform, stood beside the captain, and in the Scotch dialect which she had mastered, and spoke to the unruly crowd. Susie sat back in her seat amazed at her sister's act. Both sisters became "convicted of sin" at that meeting, and at a subsequent meeting were converted. (Note: According to The Saint Paul Globe (1897), while Swift was in London, she visited the Salvation Army barracks out of curiosity, and was there converted.)

Swift, after going through the training school in London, returned to the U.S. to see her parents. As she landed from the steamer in New York, wearing the regulation Salvation Army uniform, she was met by her mother, who almost fainted as she looked upon her daughter. She burst into tears, and declared that she would rather see her dead than a member of the Salvation army, and it was many months later before the parents became reconciled to the choice of the lifework made by the two sisters.

Swift returned to London and was made editor of All the World, the international organ of the Salvation Army, and in that capacity made a tour of three continents. She also did a sergeant's work in the army corps in the suburbs of London where she lived, office work on the English Cry, and much miscellaneous literary work. She made it her special duty to alleviate the suffering of people in the slums in New York and in London. She labored and lectured for the Salvation Army for 12 years. She trained the officers for the organization at the International Training Home, London. Swift suggested to General William Booth the outline of his work, The "Darkest England" social scheme : a brief review of the first year's work (1891). While on furlough in the U.S. in 1893, she volunteered to work in Maine and Boston. In 1895, she established a home for waif boys in London. the Newsboys' Home in Fleet Street. She also served as National Auxiliary Secretary of the Salvation Army.

Swift wrote hundreds of stories and poems for Salvation Army publications. She was the first American woman to attain the rank of Major in the Salvation Army.

=== Catholic nun ===
After returning to the U.S. as secretary to Eva Booth, 1896–97. Swift decided to become a Roman Catholic, and, although she was strongly opposed by General Booth, went to the Paulist Fathers for instruction.

On March 4, 1896, Swift converted to Catholicism. From March 1897 to August 1898, she served as assistant editor of the Catholic World Magazine and editor of the Young Catholic.

Swift left her position as Brigadier in the Salvation Army, entered religious work on August 23, 1897, and in 1898, she entered the novitiate of the Dominican Sisters, as Sister M. Imelda Teresa, Albany. When she entered the order, she gave the care of her adopted daughter, Christobel, to Mrs. Rose Hawthorne Lathrop, Sister Rose, head of the Home for Incurables.

Swift took the white and finally the black veil. She served as a director of an orphanage in Havana, Cuba, 1900–02. She was the director of the Dominican College of Our Lady Help of Christians, Havana, Cuba, between June 1901 and October 1902, and again April 1902 to June 1909. From April 1904 to April 1905, she served as novice mistress of the Dominican congregation of St. Catherine di Ricci, of Albany, New York. She was later associated with a convent in Newport, Rhode Island.

She continued writing stories, poems, and articles in periodicals of different countries, including the Sunday Companion. Some of these works included, First Annual Report, Darkest England, Social Work, as well as chapters in City of Peace and Some Roads to Rome in America.

== Death ==
Sister M. Imelda Teresa died at Saint Clara College, Sinsinawa, Wisconsin, April 19, 1916, having been stationed her for three or four years.
