= St. Clara Female Academy =

Wisconsin women's school

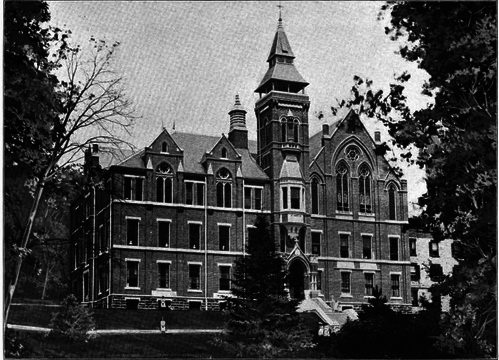
St. Clara Academy as pictured 1882-1892

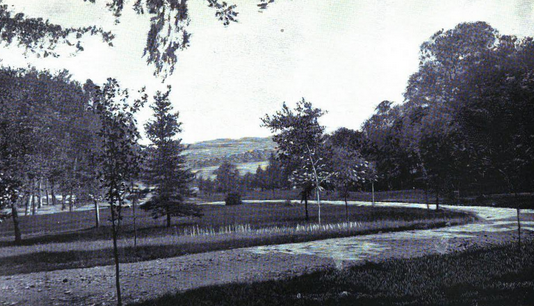
Recreation grounds for the Academic Department

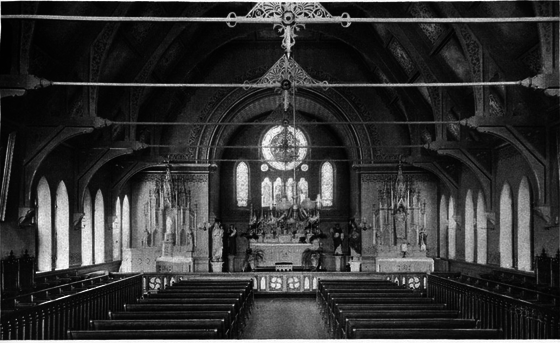
Small section of the chapel, enlarged in 1897

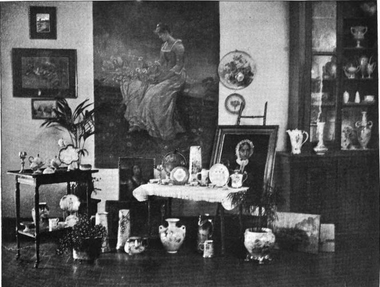
Studio in the Ceramics Department

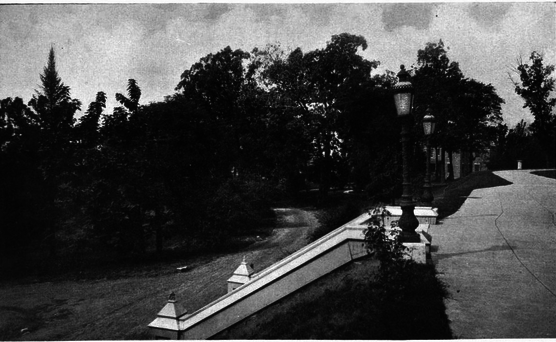
Esplanade and rectory

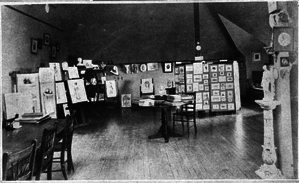
Fra. Angelica Studio

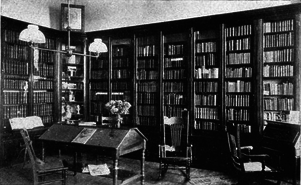
Library

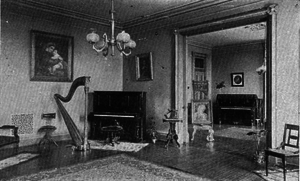
Music Department

St. Clara Female Academy was a 19th-century American parochial school, a Roman Catholic institution, in Wisconsin. After a series of changes, it is now known as Dominican University.

The Catholic college at Sinsinawa Mound, named Sinsinawa Mound College, was incorporated in 1848, and was under the management, for many years, of Father Samuel Mazzuchelli. This institution, together with the Female Academy at Benton, 12 miles (19 km) from the Mound, were established by Mazzuchelli, from the means which were furnished him by a wealthy sister, in Milan, Italy. This school was converted, some years afterwards, into the Saint Clara Female Academy. Saint Clara Academy, which Mazzuchelli founded at Sinsinawa Mound, but had transferred to Benton, Wisconsin returned to the Mound in 1864, the sisters purchasing the old buildings of Sinsinawa Mound College. The head of the institution was Mother Emily Power, whose early education was received from the founder.

== Location ==
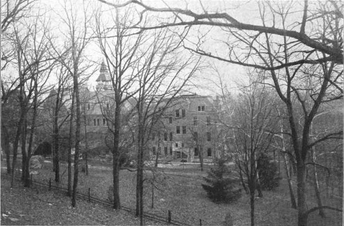
Exterior view of the buildings from top of the Mound

The academy was situated at Sinsinawa on the side of Sinsinawa Mound, Grant County, Wisconsin, in the extreme southwestern corner of the state, within the angle formed by the Mississippi River and the Illinois boundary line. Sinsinawa, in the Sioux dialect, is translated "Home of the Young Eagle". The school was upon the southern slope of the hill, sheltered from the sweeping north winds. It was about 129 feet (39 m) below the summit, yet above the reach of the miasma from the river. The grounds in front of the building were filled with an extensive growth of Norway pine, cedar and arbor vitae. Elsewhere in the grounds, nature was left to itself, excepting in opening several smooth, wide lawns. The entire estate comprised 360 acres (150 ha). The enclosure immediately surrounding the academy, composing ornamental and recreation grounds, contained 50 acres (20 ha).

== Building ==
The academy was originally located at Benton, Wisconsin, 12 miles (19 km) further to the northeast, and a sandstone structure was erected there for boarding school purposes, built in the form of a hollow quadrangle, after a plan in the European style by the founder, who was architect as well as superintendent of all the public buildings with which he was connected. In 1807, the new place was bought, as the position offered inducements superior even to the costly new structure. This building was of sandstone from a quarry on the estate built in 1845. It was four stories in height, with an observatory of three additional stories, which, from the elevated position of the building, offered a fine view of plains and the broad Mississippi. Adjoining the main building was another, erected as a hall for commencement day assemblies, concerts, lectures, and so forth, and capable of seating 2,500 persons. An extensive cabinet of philosophical and astronomical apparatus is connected with the house, a large share of which was donated from the private resources of the founder. This collection was annually increased as discoveries in science required. The entire range of buildings was heated by steam, the machinery having been in constant use at least eight months of the year.

== History ==
=== 1846-1866 ===
St. Clara Academy was founded in 1846 by Rev. Samuel Mazzuchelli, a native of Milan, Italy, where he was born in 1806. At the end of his life, he established a female academy endowed with funds falling to his share as heir of a large Italian property. The institution, founded in 1852, he placed under the charge of Dominican Sisters.

The stone building was planned by Mazzuchelli, and the east wing was constructed under his supervision, reaching completion in 1846. For 10 years, it sufficed for the accommodation of the students and the professors of the Sinsinawa College for Boys, the Brothers occupying a frame house situated near by. The Board of Trustees, Rev. T. Jarboe, president; Rev. A. O. Walker, vice-president; Rev. S. Mazzuchelli, secretary; Rev. J. Polking, Rev. T. L. Power, and Rev. Benedict Fortune, members, at their annual meeting resolved, on September 3, 1855, to erect the west end of the college building according to the original plan. On September 7, 1857, the Board of Trustees authorized the president of the college, Rev. T. Jarboe, to furnish the new part of the building in accordance with the requirements of an increased number of students. The west end of the rock building was first occupied in the fall of 1857. Another 10 years passed, and then there began a new chapter in the school's history.

The academy was a Roman Catholic Institution, its corps of teachers a body of religious women of the order of Sinsinawa Dominican Sisters, founded for the sole purpose of teaching. Many of the pupils entered with the intention of becoming teachers elsewhere, therefore the course of instruction was in the main directed to that end. Emily Power was chosen to fill the office of Mother in 1865, at the age of 20. The Sinsinawa property was originally, by the endowment of Mazzuchelli, a Dominican College. After a lapse of years, this brotherhood found itself deeply involved in debt, and sold the estate to a business firm in Dubuque, Iowa.

=== 1866 and later ===
Sinsinawa Mound College had required the services of a number of Dominican Fathers eminently fitted, not only for the work of education, but also for the special and distinctive work of the Order, the giving of Missions. The demand for missionary laborers was yearly increasing, and the Province of St. Joseph needed for that work every priest at its command. In accordance, then, with the expressed wish of the Superiors residing at Rome, the Board of Trustees of Sinsinawa College, Very Rev. D. J. Meagher, president, Rev. Jos. Turner, vice-president, at their 18th annual and 33rd special meeting, resolved, on February 24, 1866, to offer the property and buildings at Sinsinawa for sale. The Board of Trustees of St. Clara Female Academy, at Benton, Wisconsin, determined to purchase the property, and carried their design into effect on March 31, 1867. The remodeling of the building, which began at once, was finished some time in the summer, and in August, the furniture, with other portable possessions of the community, was moved from Benton to the Mound. The Sisters hopefully, yet with sadness and regret, departed from the old home, so dear because of its sacred memories, and took up their abode in the new one, not less sacred to memory, since it had been the scene of Father Mazzuchelli's first educational labors. Everything being in readiness, the new St. Clara Academy opened its doors to pupils on the first Monday of September, 1867.

Their funds for effecting this purchase had accumulated from teaching in the Academy, and in both parish and public schools. US$10,000 were expended on the buildings to make them habitable, and while the Benton place was retained as a novitiate, St. Clara Academy found a new home on Sinsinawa Mound. All the business negotiations and arrangements connected with this transfer were effected by Mother Emily Power.

The church that Mazzuchelli had erected in 1842 was used by the Sisters in 1867, and for several succeeding years, as a chapel. There being no room in the academy large enough to accommodate a commencement day audience, the erection of a hall for the purpose was a necessity; hence the structure still in use on public occasions was erected in 1868. It served as both convent and academy until 1882. From that date until 1901, it was used almost entirely as a convent. After 1901, it formed a department of the academy and the community did not use any part of it.

The very first year at the Mound, there were 115 pupils, and among them, ten states, Wisconsin, Iowa, Minnesota, Illinois, Nebraska, Arkansas, Missouri, Tennessee, Pennsylvania, and Georgia, were represented. During the first ten years, 1867 to 1877, besides the above states, California, Dakota, Colorado, Michigan, Ohio, New York, Massachusetts, and Connecticut were represented. In following years, Montana, Wyoming, New Mexico, Washington, District of Columbia, and Canada were added to the list of St. Clara’s patrons. During this first decade, the community had steadily increased its numbers and rapidly extending the field of its labors; 85 new members had been received and 16 new foundations had been made.

== Education ==
The academy proper, at Sinsinawa Mound, was a boarding school. The regular academic course of study extends through four years; for entering upon this, in the English department, a thorough knowledge of the elementary branches was required. A different department was devoted to those who are not able to meet these requirements, while yet another was available to children under 12 years of age.

The regular course of study included:

- First Year. — Arithmetic, English Grammar, Composition, United States History, Elements of Natural Philosophy, Latin and French at option.
- Second Year. — Arithmetic, Algebra, Modern History, Rhetoric, Philosophy, Physiology, Bookkeeping, Latin and French continued.
- Third Year. — Arithmetic, Algebra, Rhetoric, Philosophy, Astronomy, Physiology, Geometry, Latin and French.
- Fourth Year. — Chemistry (rudiments), Geology, Physiology, Geometry, Plane Trigonometry, Intellectual Philosophy. Taking copious notes of Historical Readings is obligatory.

Some of the textbooks used were:

- Quackenbos' Series—Grammar, Rhetoric, Philosophy and United States History. Ray's Mathematical Series, with exception of Geometry, in which Davies' Legendre is found preferable. Cutler's Physiology, Gray's Botany, Hitchcock's Geology, Youman's Chemistry, Abercrombie's Intellectual Philosophy.
- Latin. Harkness' Grammar and Reader, Andrews' Csesar, Cooper's Virgil. French. Fasquelle's Course; Readers: Sauveur's Causeries, Telemaque, Racine. German. Aim's and Woodbury's Methods, Woodbury's Readers, Goethe's Letters.
- Italian. Aim's and Ollendorf's Methods, Fonesti, Current Literature.

The various branches in the above course, with the exception of Latin and French, were obligatory for the English course, for the satisfactory fulfillment of which, an English diploma was bestowed by the faculty. A satisfactory knowledge of the iEneid of Virgil was necessary for receiving a Latin diploma. The annual number of graduates never exceeded seven, as it was arduous. The majority remained only long enough to be thoroughly drilled in the various branches of a common school education. Music was one of the special features of the school, but all students were made aware that the highest achievement of a female student was not a musical triumph or a marvel of embroidery.

== Notable alumni ==
- Charity Rusk Craig (1849-1913), sixth national president of the Woman's Relief Corps
