= Thomas T. Duffy =

American politician

Thomas T. Duffy was a member of the Wisconsin State Assembly.

== Biography ==
Duffy was born on December 6, 1835, in New York City. He moved to Benton, Wisconsin, in 1855 and graduated from Sinsinawa Mound College in 1858.

== Career ==
Duffy was elected to the Assembly in 1869. Previously, he was Treasurer of Benton and a justice of the peace in 1868. He was a Democrat.
