= Thomas K. Gibson =

American politician

Thomas Kennedy Gibson

Member of the Wisconsin Senate from the 7th district
- In office June 5, 1848 – January 10, 1849
- Preceded by: Position Established
- Succeeded by: Dennis Murphy

Personal details
- Born: December 4, 1811 Nashville, Tennessee
- Died: January 3, 1900 (aged 88) Benton, Wisconsin
- Resting place: United Methodist Church Cemetery; Benton, Wisconsin
- Party: Democratic
- Spouse: Margarette T. Murphy (m. 1860; died 1881)
- Children: 6

Thomas Kennedy Gibson (December 4, 1811 – January 3, 1900) was an American farmer, miner and storekeeper from Benton, Wisconsin, who served as a Democratic member of the Wisconsin State Senate in the 1st Wisconsin Legislature in 1848.

== Background ==
Gibson was born December 4, 1811, near Nashville, Tennessee, son of James Gibson and Diannah (Beck) Sitton. At the age of three, he moved with his family to Missouri. In the spring of 1833 he left for Dubuque (at that time in unorganized territory) and worked as a miner until the fall of 1834, when he went back to Missouri, bought cattle which he drove back to Dubuque and sold, then resumed work in the mines until 1836, when he returned to Missouri and ran a store for a while (interspersed with occasional horseback trips to St. Louis) until fall of 1837, when he moved to Benton. He worked as a miner in Benton for many years.

== Public office ==
Prior to the 1847 separation of Lafayette County, Gibson was elected a county commissioner (equivalent to a county supervisor) for Iowa County, Wisconsin Territory in September 1845. He was a member of the five-man Board of Arbitrators created in 1847 to settle disputes over land claims in the New Diggings area.

In 1848, upon Wisconsin's admission to the Union, Gibson was elected as a Democrat to represent Lafayette County in the new Senate. He was assigned to the standing committees on the militia, on agriculture and manufactures, and on engrossed bills. He did not seek re-election.

== Later years ==
In 1849 he opened a store in Benton, which he would operate for the next ten years. In 1857, newly elected President James Buchanan appointed him postmaster of Benton. In 1859, Gibson sold the store and moved to Hastings, Minnesota, and farmed there. On June 17, 1860, he married Margaret or Margarette T. Murphy, a native of Lafayette County and the sister of his successor in the senate, Dennis Murphy. They stayed on the farm in Hastings until their 1865 return to Benton, where they also farmed. By 1881, Gibson owned about 500 acres of land, as well as real estate in Benton itself; and the couple had six children.

He died January 3, 1900, in Benton, and was buried at the United Methodist Church Cemetery.
