= Dennis Murphy (Wisconsin politician) =

19th century American politician

Member of the Wisconsin Senate from the 7th district
- In office January 1, 1849 – January 6, 1851
- Preceded by: Thomas K. Gibson
- Succeeded by: Samuel G. Bugh

Personal details
- Party: Democratic

Dennis Murphy was an American politician. He was a Democratic member of the Wisconsin State Senate during the 1849 and 1850 sessions. He represented the 7th District. He was postmaster of Benton, Wisconsin.
