= Saint Patrick's Church (Benton, Wisconsin) =

Catholic church in Benton, Wisconsin, United States

Coordinates: 42°34′03.5″N 90°22′43.4″W

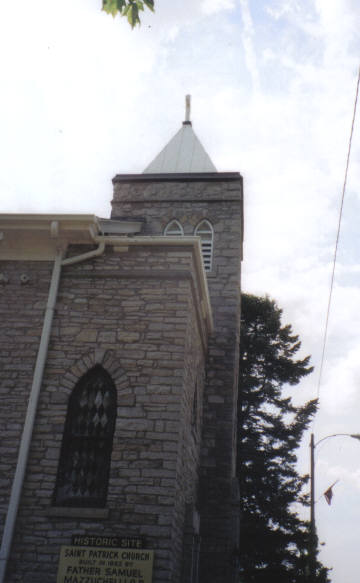
Saint Patrick's Church, Benton, Wisconsin.

Saint Patrick's Church is the Catholic parish for Benton, Wisconsin and surrounding areas. The parish is part of the Diocese of Madison.

The church was built in 1852 by the pioneer priest Samuel Charles Mazzuchelli, a Dominican. Mazzuchelli was the church's architect, as well as its founder. Mazzuchelli — who was declared Venerable by Pope John Paul II in 1993 — is buried in the church cemetery. The church was one of 25 he built in the Upper Mississippi valley.
