= Benton Stone Water Tower =

- U.S. National Register of Historic Places
- Location within Wisconsin Location within the United States
- Location: 49 Water St. Benton, Wisconsin
- Coordinates: 42°34′15″N 90°22′58″W
- Built: 1900
- NRHP reference No.: 98001598
- Added to NRHP: January 7, 1999

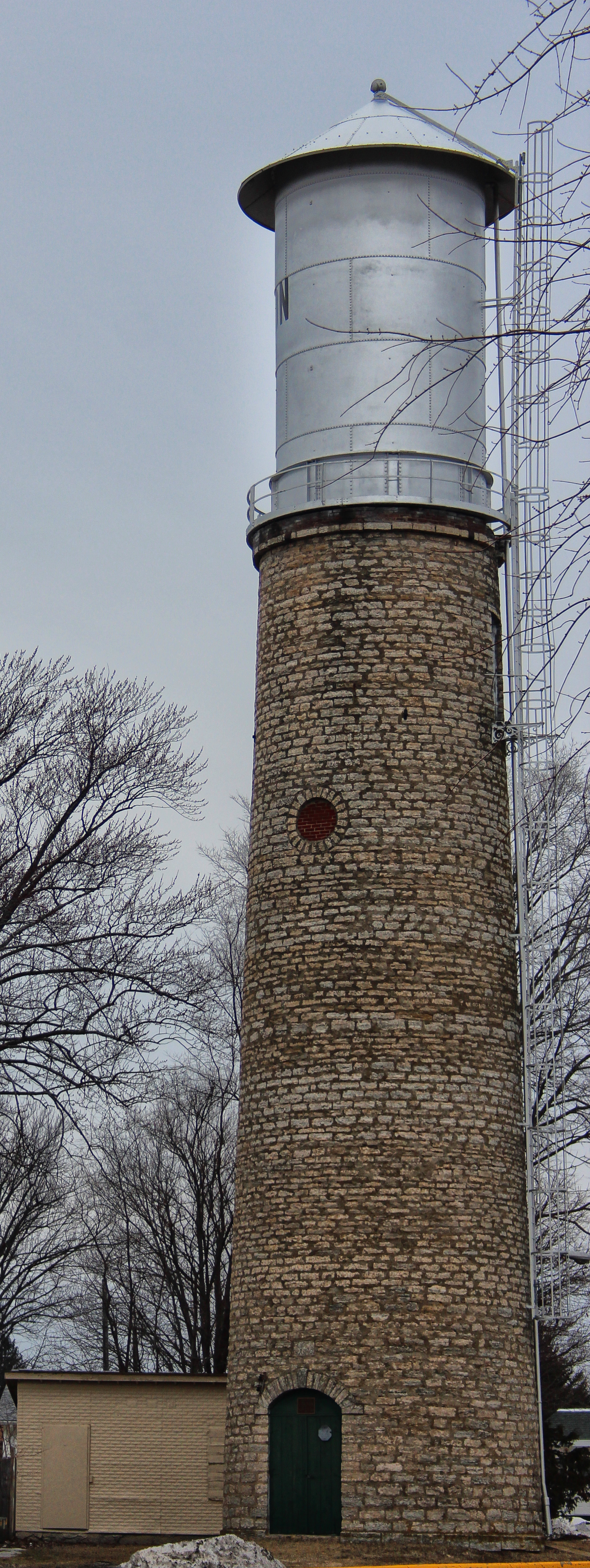
The tower in 2013

The Benton Stone Water Tower is located in Benton, Wisconsin. It was added to the National Register of Historic Places in 1999.

Benton's history goes back to early lead-mining days. In 1827 Andrew Murphy built a mill race there. The village grew as mining expanded, shrank when many of the miners left for California in 1849, then gradually grew back.

After a fire destroyed Benton's store and two houses in February 1899, the people decided unanimously to investigate "a waterworks" system. When a committee recommended a $4000 system financed with bonds to be paid back by taxes, it was put to a referendum and approved 84 to 24. The aim was "to supply water for domestic and sanitary purposes and for extinguishing fires."

A lot was bought on the hill and a 50-foot well was dug with a large reservoir. M. Tschirgi of Dubuque built the stone tower, coursed limestone 67 feet tall with a door with a segmental arch and circular glass-filled windows. On top of the tower sat a wooden tank 18 feet around and 18 feet high. And atop the tank stood a windmill, which pumped water from the reservoir below up into the tank. (The NRHP nomination contains a photo of the original arrangement.) Hydrants were connected to the tower. The system was complete and working by the end of 1899.

In February 1900 the newspaper reported that R.A. Blades would add a "bathing room" to his "tonsorial parlor." (Blades was one of Benton's barbers, and contract supervisor during construction of the tower.) Apparently this meant a room where you could pay to bathe. A fire company was organized around the same time.

In 1923 the town replaced the wooden tank with a 30,000 gallon steel tank with a conical steel roof, built by the Chicago Bridge and Iron Works. The windmill was removed in the 1930s. The tower was refurbished in 2010.

Today the old tower stands as a prominent landmark in Benton, an example of fine stonework and early public works engineering. The NRHP nomination also notes that "determination to build a waterworks marked an important step in the evolution of community spirit and willingness to raise taxes for a common purpose."
