= Hazel Green (town), Wisconsin =

Town in Grant County, Wisconsin

Hazel Green
- Town
- Etymology: Likely named for the abundance of hazel bushes in the area.
- Nickname: Hardscrabble (historic)
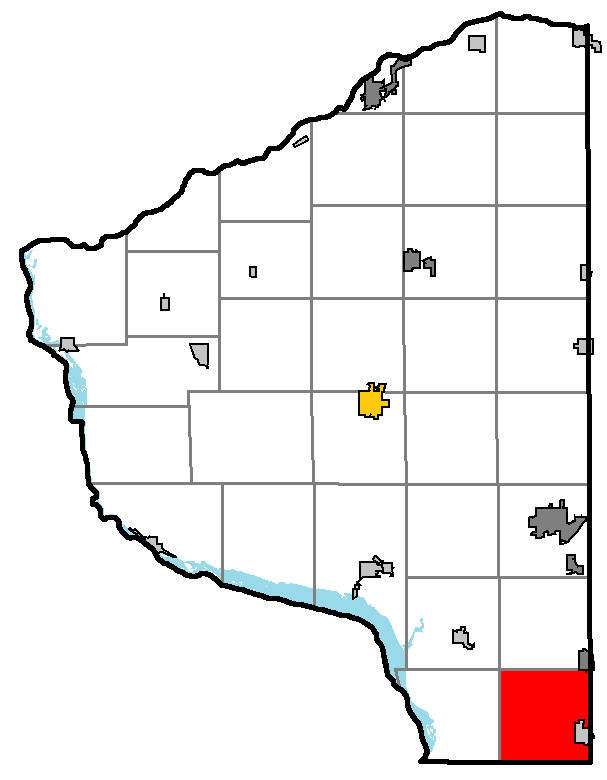
- Location of Hazel Green, within Grant County, Wisconsin

- Location within Wisconsin
- Coordinates: 42°33′07″N 90°29′12″W
- Country: United States
- State: Wisconsin
- County: Grant
- Post office established: 1838

Area
  - Total: 35.2 sq mi (91.1 km^{2})
  - Land: 35.2 sq mi (91.1 km^{2})
  - Water: 0 sq mi (0.0 km^{2})
- Elevation: 928 ft (283 m)

Population (2020)
  - Total: 1,084
  - Density: 30.8/sq mi (11.9/km^{2})
- Time zone: UTC-6 (CST)
  - Summer (DST): UTC-5 (CDT)

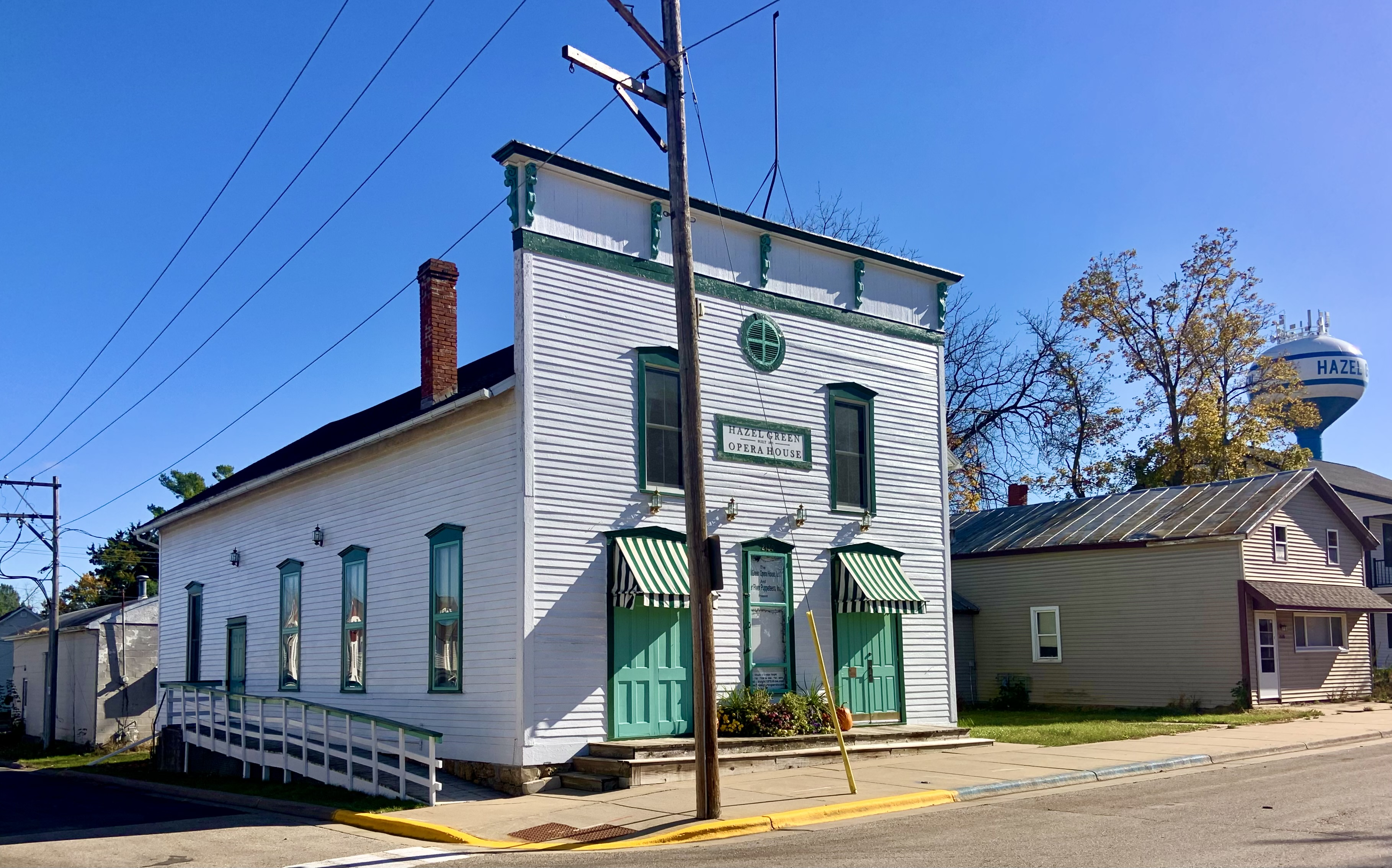
Hazel Green Town Hall

Hazel Green is a town in Grant County, Wisconsin, United States. The population was 1,084 at the 2020 census. The Village of Hazel Green is located partially within the town. The unincorporated community of Prairie Corners is located in the town. The unincorporated community of Sinsinawa, Wisconsin, is also located partially in the town.

== Hardscrabble or Hard Scrabble history ==
In the early days of Wisconsin Territory's "lead rush", this area was known as Hardscrabble or Hard Scrabble, and will be found referred to under that name in some histories. The more dignified name of Hazel Green was adopted when a post office was established in 1838. The first known white settlers here arrived about 1822 to mine lead.

== Geography ==
According to the United States Census Bureau, the town has a total area of 35.2 square miles (91.1 km^{2}), all land.

== Demographics ==
As of the census of 2000, there were 1,043 people, 301 households, and 242 families living in the town. The population density was 29.6 people per square mile (11.4/km^{2}). There were 315 housing units at an average density of 9.0 per square mile (3.5/km^{2}). The racial makeup of the town was 98.66% White, 0.19% Black or African American, 0.29% Asian, and 0.86% from two or more races. 0.10% of the population were Hispanic or Latino of any race.

There were 301 households, out of which 37.9% had children under the age of 18 living with them, 73.1% were married couples living together, 6.3% had a female householder with no husband present, and 19.3% were non-families. 15.9% of all households were made up of individuals, and 6.6% had someone living alone who was 65 years of age or older. The average household size was 2.93 and the average family size was 3.30.

In the town, the population was spread out, with 25.7% under the age of 18, 6.4% from 18 to 24, 22.3% from 25 to 44, 21.5% from 45 to 64, and 24.1% who were 65 years of age or older. The median age was 41 years. For every 100 females, there were 73.3 males. For every 100 females age 18 and over, there were 65.2 males.

The median income for a household in the town was $42,083, and the median income for a family was $46,389. Males had a median income of $27,344 versus $20,625 for females. The per capita income for the town was $17,128. About 7.3% of families and 16.2% of the population were below the poverty line, including 13.3% of those under age 18 and 30.9% of those age 65 or over.
