= Belmont Mound State Park =

State park in Lafayette County, Wisconsin

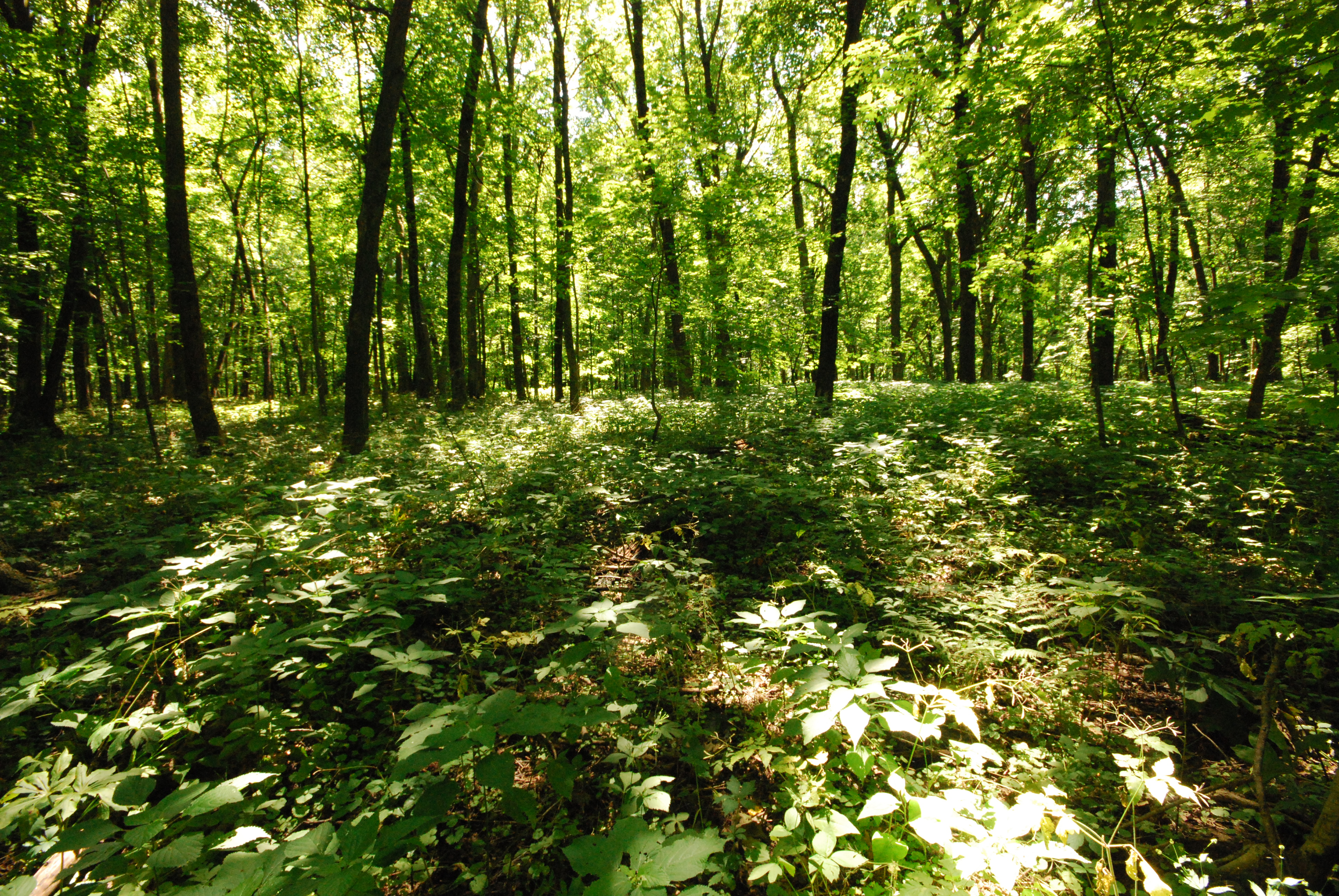

- Location within Wisconsin Location within the United States
- Interactive map of Belmont Mound State Park
- Location: Lafayette County, Wisconsin, United States
- Coordinates: 42°46′7″N 90°20′58″W
- Elevation: 1,401 ft (427 m)
- Established: 1961
- Administrator: Belmont Lions Club
- Website: Official website
- Wisconsin State Parks

Belmont Mound State Park is a state park of Wisconsin, United States, containing Belmont Mound, a 400-foot (120 m) hill. The park is managed by the Belmont Lions Club rather than the Wisconsin Department of Natural Resources. Belmont Mound is an outlier of the Niagara Escarpment, one of several in this part of the unglaciated Driftless Area. "Belmont" derives from the French for "beautiful mountain".

A portion of the park received further protection in 1981 when Belmont Mound Woods State Natural Area was added to the Wisconsin State Natural Areas Program.

The First Capitol Historic Site, where the first session of the Wisconsin Territory Legislature met beginning on October 25, 1836, is located just west of the park entrance.

The park is for day-use only; there are picnic facilities but no campground. In 2019, the Lions Club decided to take down the park's observation tower following a third suicide. The tower had been closed to the public and its stairs removed a decade earlier due to misuse. In the fall of 2021, the removal of the observation tower was completed.
