= Thomas Cruson =

American politician

Thomas King Cruson December 10, 1802 – October 16, 1882) was an American pioneer and legislator.

Born in Mason County, Kentucky, he lived in Saint Louis, Missouri. He moved to New Diggings, Michigan Territory in 1825 and then to Platteville, Michigan Territory, in 1829. He enlisted in the militia and took part in the Black Hawk War of 1832. He served in the Wisconsin Territorial Legislature in 1838, 1839, 1840, 1845, and 1846. Cruson then served in the first Wisconsin Constitutional Convention of 1846, as a Whig. In 1850, he moved to California and took part in the California Gold Rush.

He died in Placerville, California in 1882, where he lived with his family.
