= Saint Augustine Church (New Diggings, Wisconsin) =

Historic church in Wisconsin, United States

- U.S. National Register of Historic Places
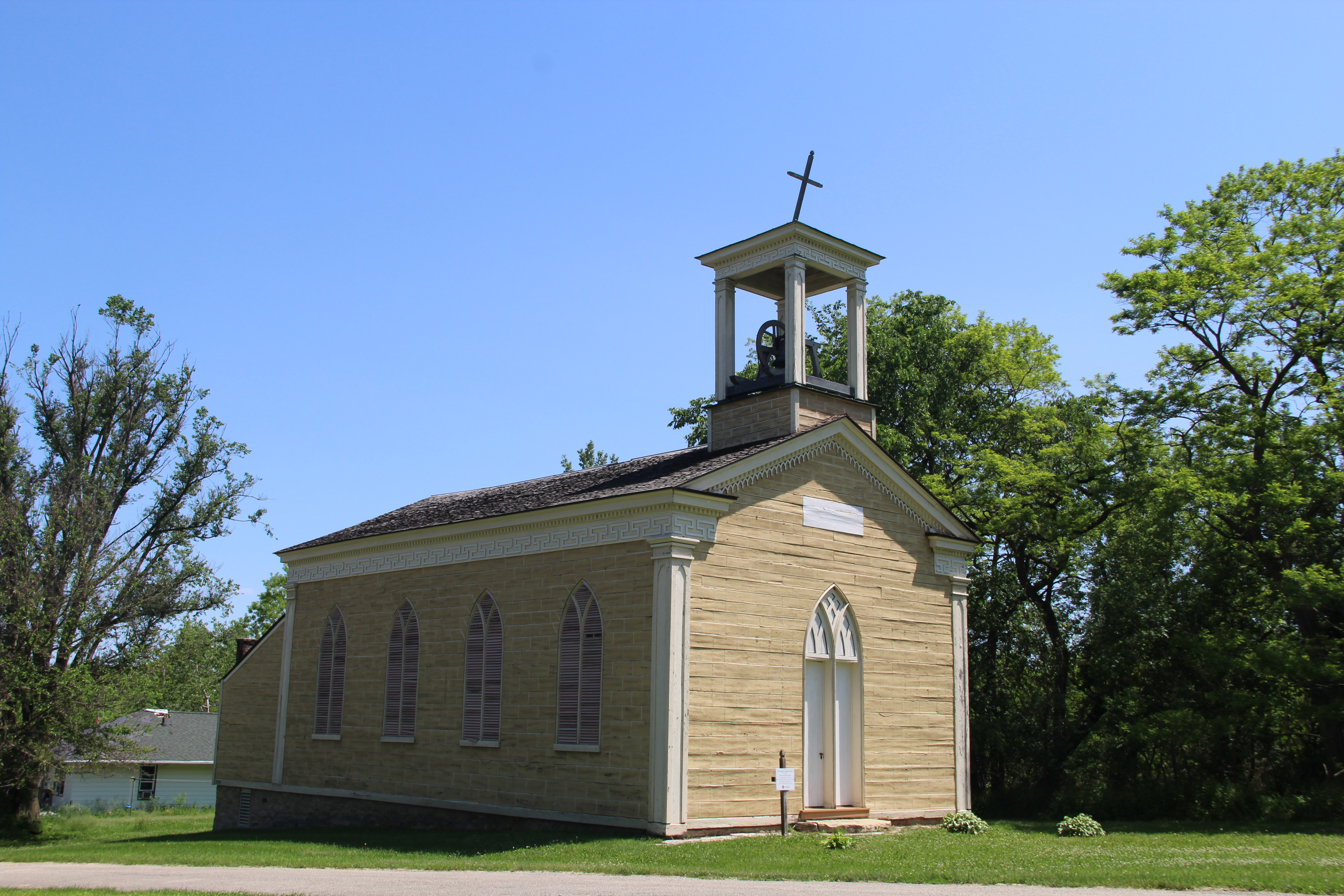
- Location: New Diggings, Wisconsin
- Coordinates: 42.53371°N 90.33392°W
- Architect: Samuel C. Mazzuchelli
- Architectural style: Greek Revival, Gothic Revival
- NRHP reference No.: 72000057
- Added to NRHP: February 23, 1972

Saint Augustine Church is an early Catholic church built in 1844 in New Diggings, Wisconsin, during the area's lead-mining boom. The building was designed by pioneer priest and amateur architect Father Samuel Mazzuchelli, and survives unchanged from that early era.

Carlo Gaetano Samuele Mazzuchelli was born in Milan, Italy in 1806. He entered the Dominican Order, came to America at age 22, and became a priest in 1830. Father Mazzuchelli served for five years in Upper Michigan and northern Wisconsin, then moved to the lead region, where he served as missionary and priest to many far-flung miners and settlers. Mazzuchelli established more than 35 parishes and designed buildings for 20 to 25 of them.

Saint Augustine parish was founded in 1835. The current building was constructed in 1844, designed by Father Mazzuchelli himself. The priest mixed styles in ways that a trained architect might not have, but the result is pleasing. Richard Perrin writes, "This building...is one of the genuine architectural gems in the state of Wisconsin...an important element of Wisconsin's cultural legacy."

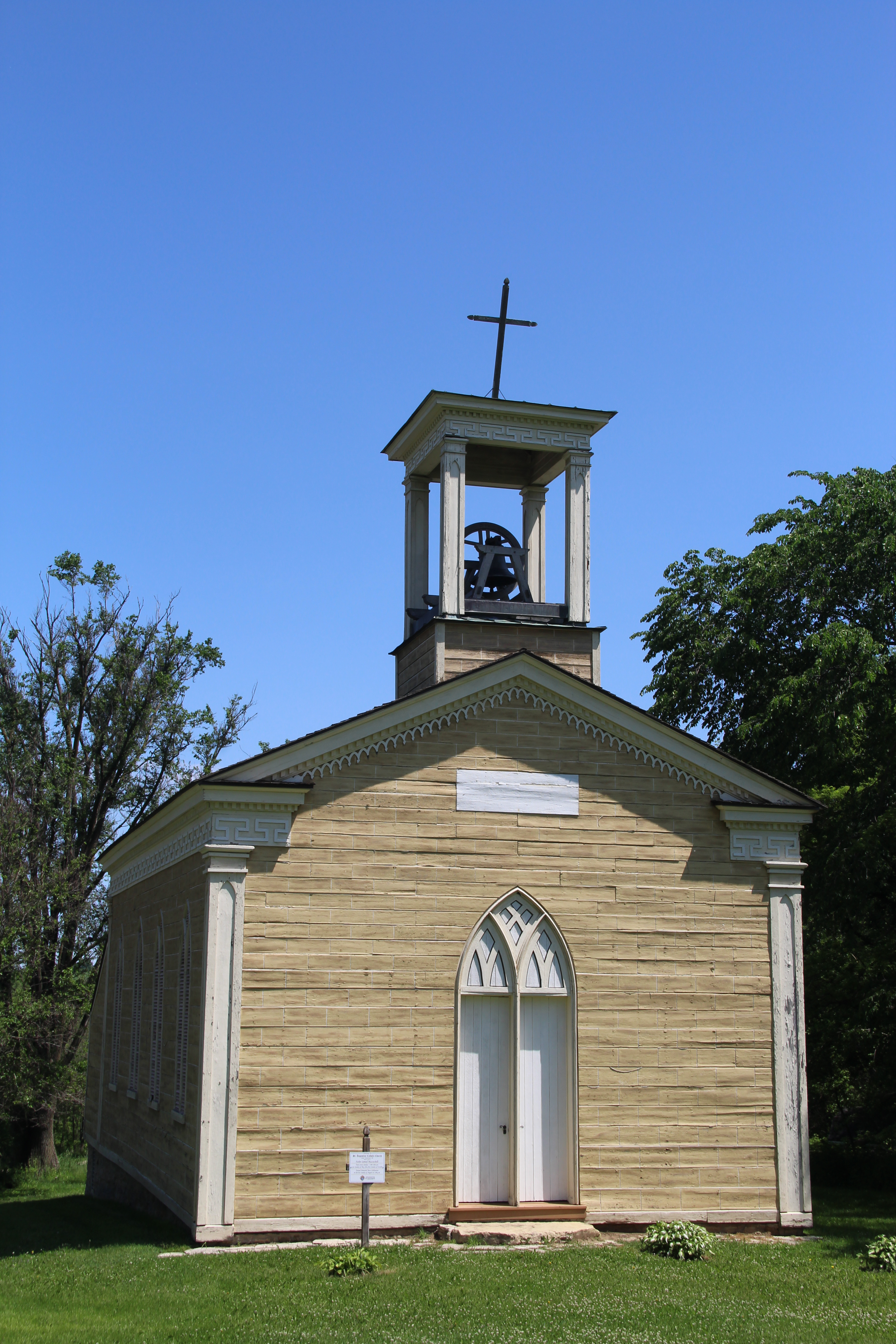

The church is a small wooden structure on a limestone foundation. The general form of the building is Greek Revival, seen in the low-pitched roof and the cornice returns. But smaller elements are Gothic Revival: the pointed arches on the door and windows and in the corner pilasters, the pointed corbeling under the raking cornice. The walls are clad in 9-inch wood planks grooved to look like stone blocks. The exterior was never painted. On top is a spare bell tower styled like the rest of the church, topped with a small cross.

Inside the church are the original simple pews and finely carved altar rails. Three rooms behind the altar once provided living quarters for the priest whenever he stayed in the village. Father Mazzuchelli opened a school in these rooms in 1847 and staffed the small school with Sinsinawa Dominican Sisters.

In the 1960s some local Knights of Columbus began to restore the building. They rebuilt the foundation and replaced some parts of the bell tower. But after 120 years, they found much of the structure and wood sound. Since then the Father Mazzuchelli Assembly of the Knights of Columbus of Lancaster, Wisconsin has continued restoration.

Now in the Diocese of Madison, St. Augustine has not been an active parish for over a century. Some of Father Mazzuchelli's other church buildings survive with modifications, but only this one remains unchanged. This gives the church a special historical connection to Father Mazzuchelli, and it remains a place of pilgrimage. The building is open on Sunday afternoons, and a memorial Mass is held annually on the last Sunday of August. A number of historical artifacts, such as account books, records, letters, and other materials are preserved in the archives at Sinsinawa Mound in Sinsinawa, Wisconsin.
