= Sinsinawa Mound raid =

Native American raid of 19th century

Coordinates: 42°31′23″N 90°32′36″W

- Part of the Black Hawk War
Date	June 29, 1832
Location	Sinsinawa Mound settlement (present day Grant County, Wisconsin)
Result	British Band victory

Belligerents
United States	Sauk and Meskwaki of Black Hawk's British Band

Commanders and leaders
James W. Stephenson	

Strength
3	unknown

Casualties and losses
2 killed	0

The Sinsinawa Mound raid occurred on June 29, 1832, near the Sinsinawa mining settlement in Michigan Territory (present-day Grant County, Wisconsin, in the United States). This incident, part of the Black Hawk War, resulted in the deaths of two men; a third man survived by seeking cover in a nearby blockhouse. In the aftermath of the raid, Captain James W. Stephenson set out to pursue the attackers—a straggling band of Sauk—but lost their trail at the Mississippi River. The attack occurred in the same week as other skirmishes and raids, and as a result helped contribute to the growing fear in the region. The raid caused the residents of nearby Platteville to consider fleeing their settlement.

== Background ==
As a consequence of an 1804 treaty between the governor of Indiana Territory and a group of Sauk and Meskwaki leaders regarding land settlement, the tribes vacated their lands in Illinois and moved west of the Mississippi in 1828. However, Sauk Chief Black Hawk and others disputed the treaty, claiming that the full tribal councils had not been consulted, nor did those representing the tribes have authorization to cede lands. Angered by the loss of his birthplace, between 1830–31 Black Hawk led a number of incursions across the Mississippi River into Illinois, but was persuaded each time to return west without bloodshed. In April 1832, encouraged by promises of alliance with other tribes and the British, he again moved his "British Band" of around 1,000 warriors and non-combatants into Illinois. Finding no allies, he attempted to return across the Mississippi (to present-day Iowa), but the undisciplined Illinois Militia's actions led to the Battle of Stillman's Run. A number of other engagements followed, and the militia of Michigan Territory and the state of Illinois were mobilized to hunt down Black Hawk's band. The conflict became known as the Black Hawk War.

The period between Stillman's Run and the raid at Sinsinawa Mound was filled with war-related activity. A series of attacks at Buffalo Grove, the Plum River settlement, Fort Blue Mounds and the war's most famous incident, the Indian Creek massacre, all took place between mid-May and late June 1832. The week before the Battle of Apple River Fort (on June 24) was an important turning point for the settlers: between June 16 and 18 two key battles, one at Waddams Grove and the other at Horseshoe Bend, played a role in changing public perception about the militia after its defeat at Stillman's Run. The Battle of Apple River Fort occurred five days before the Sinsinawa Mound raid; the fight was a 45-minute gun battle between defenders garrisoned inside Apple River Fort and Sauk and Meskwaki warriors led by Chief Black Hawk himself.

== Prelude ==
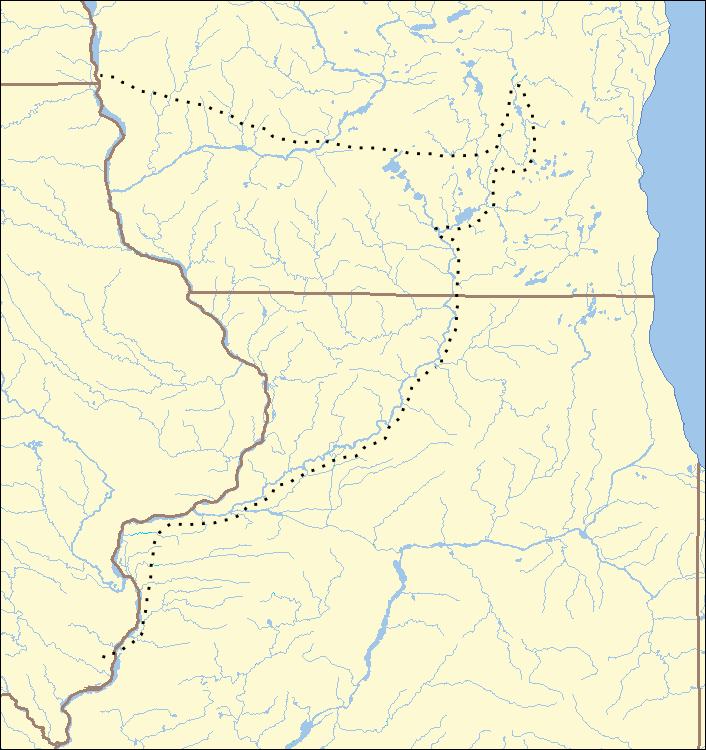
Map of Black Hawk War sites
Battle (with name) Fort / settlement Native village
Symbols are wikilinked to article

George Wallace Jones, who would later become a U.S. Senator from Iowa, arrived in the Sinsinawa Mound area in 1827, and in 1828 established a mining settlement there. The first structure at the settlement was Jones's own log cabin, built during the spring of 1828 in two days. The cabin measured 49 feet (14.9 m) by 17 feet (5.2 m) and each room had one door and one window. When the Black Hawk War began four years later he also built a small fort at the site. The remains of the fort, one of many constructed in the region to protect local residents, are said to still stand at the entrance to the Sinsinawa Dominican complex. One of the men who assisted Jones in building the fort's blockhouse was Enoch Robinson, a soldier who later helped bury the victims of the Sinsinawa Mound raid. At the time of the attack Jones was with Henry Dodge's militia volunteers, on the way to meet overall commander General Henry Atkinson at Lake Koshkonong, then a marsh region.

== Attack ==
On June 29, 1832, what was probably a small band of Sauk attacked three men working in a cornfield at the Jones mining settlement near Sinsinawa Mound. The Sauk took up a position directly between the settlers and their weapons. Two of the men—James Boxley and John Thompson—were killed by the raiding party; their badly mutilated bodies were later recovered. The third, an unidentified man, made a run for Jones's blockhouse and survived the attack. The raiders were most likely a group of stragglers from the main body of the British Band, which was moving toward the Rock River with Chief Black Hawk.

== Aftermath ==
When news of the raid reached Galena, Illinois, Captain James W. Stephenson set out with thirty soldiers to pursue the raiding party. Arriving at Sinsinawa Mound, they buried the two "most shockingly mutilated" settlers there; both Thompson and Boxley had been scalped and Thompson's heart had been removed. Stephenson then followed the Sauk trail to the Mississippi River where it went cold, the raiders having apparently crossed the river. Stephenson's party returned to Galena empty handed. Henry Dodge ordered the various elements of the militia to rendezvous at Fort Hamilton to eventually join General Henry Atkinson near present-day Madison, Wisconsin. When word of the attack at Sinsinawa Mound reached George W. Jones he left the volunteers under the command of Dodge and returned to the settlement at the mound.

The attack at Sinsinawa Mound, compounded by other incidents around the region, helped contribute to the fear gripping the settlers. The people of Platteville, in present-day Wisconsin, contemplated fleeing to Galena, about 25 miles (40 km) south, as a direct result of the Sinsinawa Mound raid. Colonel Dodge dispatched one of his men, Frederick Hollman, to Platteville to reassure its nervous residents. However, by the time Hollman arrived the settlers had already been informed that the local Ho-Chunk tribesmen were friendly. This and the subsequent delivery of promised supplies from Galena further placated Platteville's residents, and the threatened exodus was called off.
