= Belmont, Wisconsin =

Village in Lafayette County, Wisconsin

- Village
- First Capitol Historic Site

- Location of Belmont in Lafayette County, Wisconsin.
- Coordinates: 42°45′29″N 90°21′54″W
- Country: United States
- State: Wisconsin
- County: Lafayette

Area
  - Total: 0.88 sq mi (2.28 km^{2})
  - Land: 0.88 sq mi (2.28 km^{2})
  - Water: 0 sq mi (0.00 km^{2})
- Elevation: 1,180 ft (360 m)

Population (2020)
  - Total: 989
  - Density: 1,106.9/sq mi (427.37/km^{2})
- Time zone: UTC-6 (Central (CST))
  - Summer (DST): UTC-5 (CDT)
- Area code: 608
- FIPS code: 55-06450
- GNIS feature ID: 1582788
- Website: www.vi.belmont.wi.gov

Belmont is a village in Lafayette County, Wisconsin, United States. The population was 989 at the 2020 census. It was the original capital of the Wisconsin Territory during the first legislative assembly in 1836.

== History ==
Founded in 1835 by land speculator John Atchison, Belmont was the original capital of the Wisconsin Territory, and the original territorial capitol building is preserved several miles northwest of the village at First Capitol Historic Site. The village is adjacent to the Town of Belmont. The name Belmont comes from the French for "beautiful mountain", referencing three hills within the village.

== Geography ==
According to the United States Census Bureau, the village has a total area of 0.88 square miles (2.28 km^{2}), all land. Belmont Mound State Park is located northwest of the village.

== Demographics ==
Historical population
Census	Pop.	Note	%±
1880	410		—
1890	378		−7.8%
1900	509		34.7%
1910	532		4.5%
1920	498		−6.4%
1930	452		−9.2%
1940	476		5.3%
1950	474		−0.4%
1960	616		30.0%
1970	688		11.7%
1980	826		20.1%
1990	823		−0.4%
2000	871		5.8%
2010	986		13.2%
2020	989		0.3%
U.S. Decennial Census

=== 2010 census ===
As of the census of 2010, there were 986 people, 439 households, and 279 families living in the village. The population density was 1,120.5 inhabitants per square mile (432.6/km^{2}). There were 454 housing units at an average density of 515.9 per square mile (199.2/km^{2}). The racial makeup of the village was 98.8% White, 0.2% African American, 0.2% Asian, 0.1% from other races, and 0.7% from two or more races. Hispanic or Latino people of any race were 0.7% of the population.

There were 439 households, of which 26.4% had children under the age of 18 living with them, 48.5% were married couples living together, 9.6% had a female householder with no husband present, 5.5% had a male householder with no wife present, and 36.4% were non-families. 31.2% of all households were made up of individuals, and 13.9% had someone living alone who was 65 years of age or older. The average household size was 2.25 and the average family size was 2.80.

The median age in the village was 39.8 years. 23.3% of residents were under the age of 18; 7.1% were between the ages of 18 and 24; 25.1% were from 25 to 44; 26.7% were from 45 to 64; and 18% were 65 years of age or older. The gender makeup of the village was 47.2% male and 52.8% female.

=== 2000 census ===
As of the census of 2000, there were 871 people, 377 households, and 245 families living in the village. The population density was 1,511.6 people per square mile (579.8/km^{2}). There were 401 housing units at an average density of 695.9 per square mile (266.9/km^{2}). The racial composition of the village was 99.66% White, 0.11% Black or African American, 0.11% Native American, and 0.11% from two or more races. 0.11% of the population were Hispanic or Latino of any race.

There were 377 households, of which 24.1% had children under the age of 18 living with them, 52.0% were married couples living together, 9.3% had a female householder with no husband present, and 35.0% were non-families. 30.0% of all households were composed of individuals, and 17.2% had someone living alone who was 65 years of age or older. The average household size was 2.31 and the average family size was 2.90.

In the village, the population was spread out, with 23.8% under the age of 18, 8.3% from 18 to 24, 24.8% from 25 to 44, 22.0% from 45 to 64, and 21.1% who were 65 years of age or older. The median age was 41 years. For every 100 females, there were 91.9 males. For every 100 females age 18 and over, there were 86.5 males.

The median income for a household in the village was $34,853, and the median income for a family was $49,688. Males had a median income of $28,646 versus $22,159 for females. The per capita income for the village was $17,763. About 1.7% of families and 5.4% of the population were below the poverty line, including 4.5% of those younger than age 18 and 9.6% of those age 65 or over.

== Education ==
Belmont High School is the local high school.

== Transportation ==
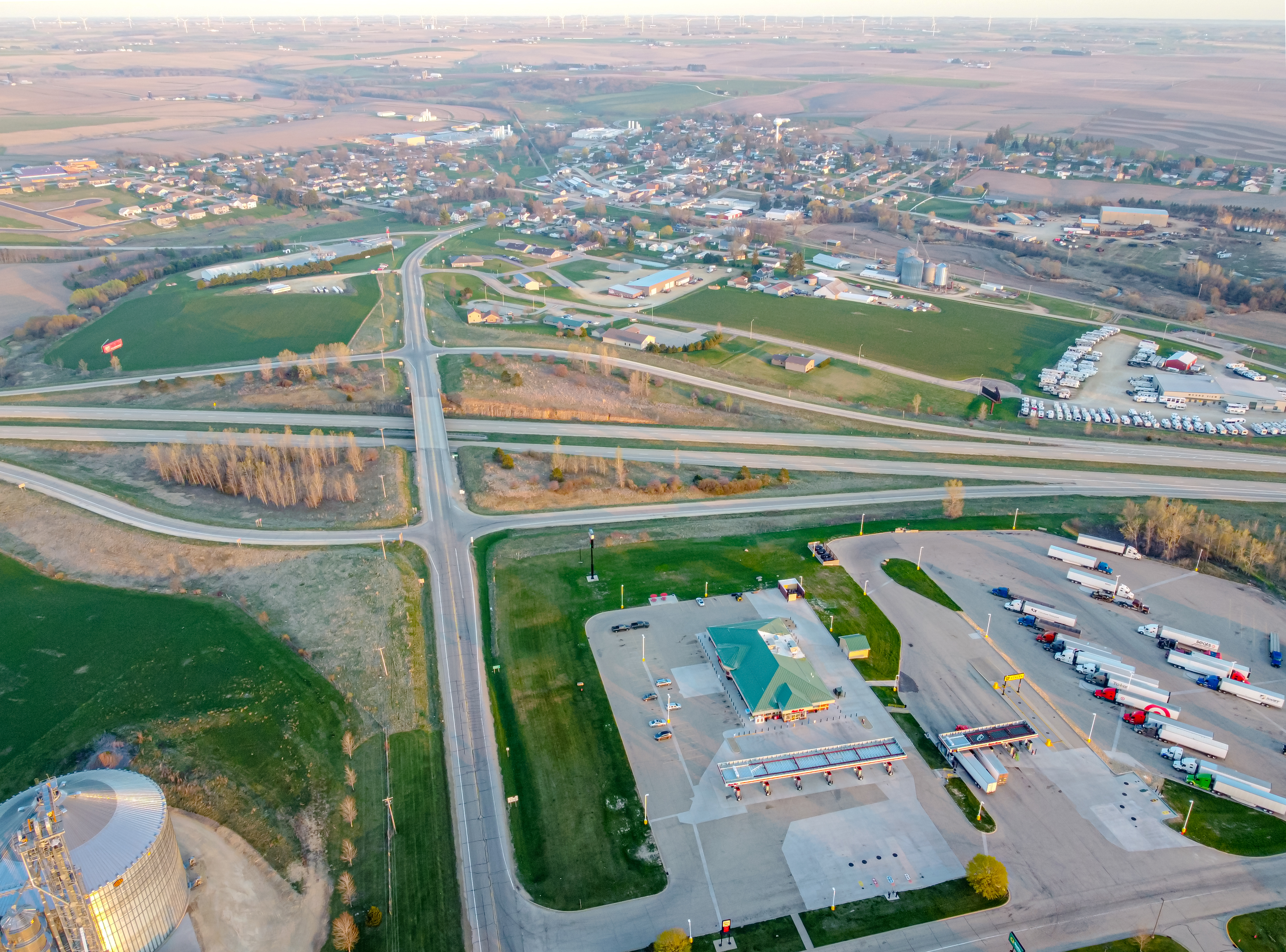
US-151 runs through town.

For many years, U.S. Highway 151 was routed through Belmont. The highway was expanded to four lanes in 2004, with the new highway being routed to the north of the village.

== Notable people ==
- James Clarke, third Governor of Iowa Territory
- James Dolan, lawyer and politician
- Charles Dunn, jurist and lawyer
- Nathan Olmsted, lawyer and politician
- Ninian E. Whiteside, first speaker of the Wisconsin State Assembly
