= Etna, Wisconsin =

- Unincorporated community
- Location within Wisconsin Location within the United States
- Coordinates: 42°33′57″N 90°19′39″W
- Country: United States
- State: Wisconsin
- County: Lafayette
- Town: New Diggings
- Elevation: 758 ft (231 m)
- Time zone: UTC-6 (Central (CST))
  - Summer (DST): UTC-5 (CDT)
- Area code: 608
- GNIS feature ID: 1577591

Etna (Aetna) is an unincorporated community located in the town of New Diggings, in Lafayette County, Wisconsin, United States. It lies at an elevation of 758 feet (231 m). Originally named Aetna, a local legend has it that a lime kiln representing the spouting of the Sicilian Mount Etna stood on the spot of the community.
