= Sinsinawa Mound College =

Sinsinawa Mound College for men (1846-1852) was located in Sinsinawa, Wisconsin.

== History ==
The college was founded in 1846 by Samuel Charles Mazzuchelli, an Italian Catholic missionary. Dominican sisters were brought to the college in 1847. The college was sold in 1852. The Dominican center was relocated to Benton, Wisconsin.

The Sinsinawa Dominican Sisters bought Sinsinawa after Mazzuchelli's death in 1864. They

"moved the school and motherhouse back to the Mound. The academy expanded into a women's college, awarding its first degrees in 1901, although the women's college moved in 1922, and the girls' academy closed in 1970."

The organizational records for the college are in the Samuel Charles Mazzuchelli Papers, 1825-1869, held by the University of Wisconsin–Platteville.

== Notable alumni ==
- Thomas T. Duffy, politician
- Thomas C. Power, politician
