= Water Street Commercial Historic District (Shullsburg, Wisconsin) =

Historic district in Wisconsin, United States

- U.S. National Register of Historic Places
- U.S. Historic district
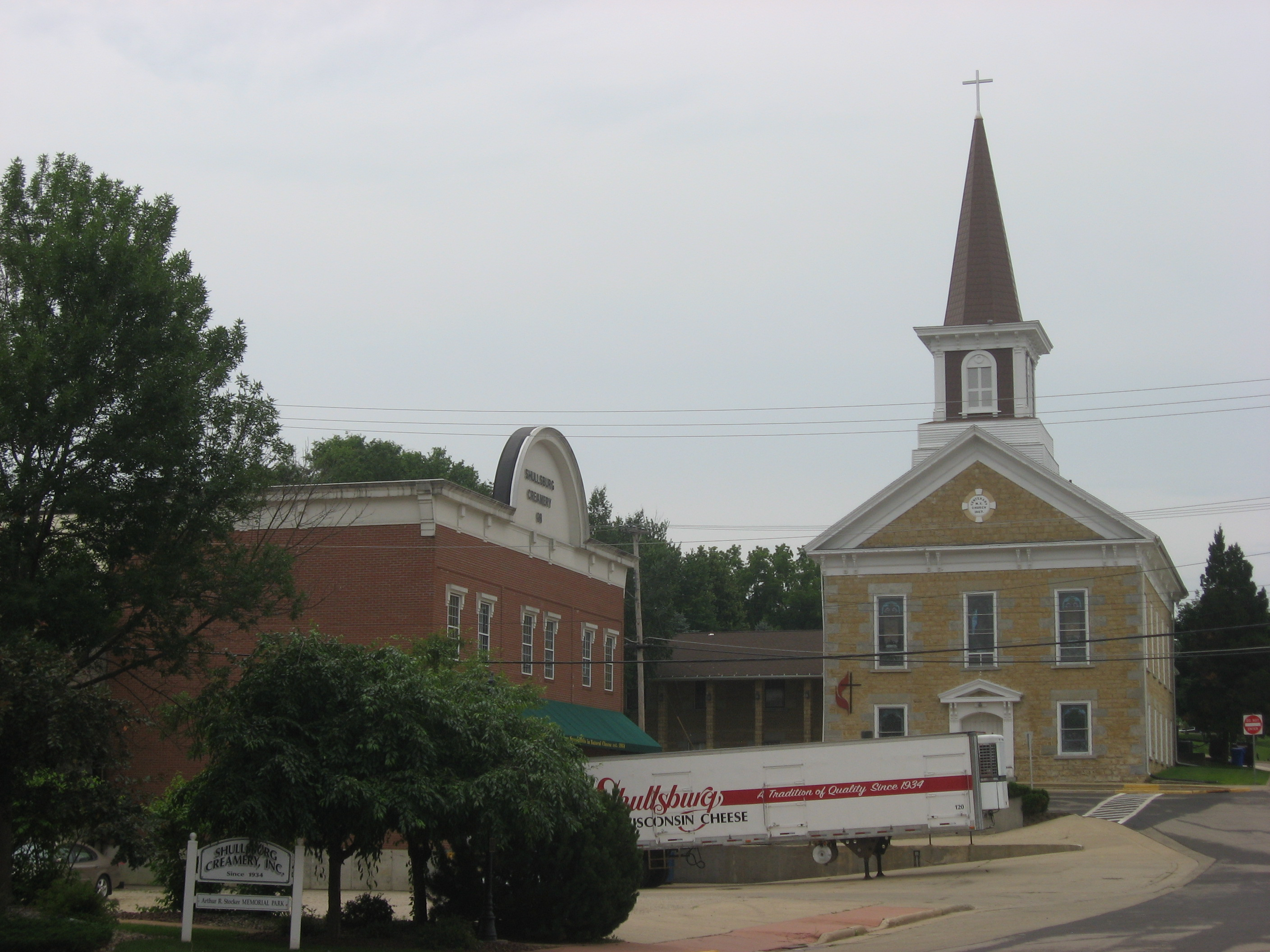

- Location within Wisconsin Location within the United States
- Location: Roughly Water St. from Judgement to Kennedy Sts. and Gratiot St. from Water to Church Sts., Shullsburg, Wisconsin
- Coordinates: 42.575556°N 90.238889°W
- Area: 7 acres (2.8 ha)
- Architect: Gratiot, C.C.
- Architectural style: Greek Revival, Italianate, Romanesque
- NRHP reference No.: 90000998
- Added to NRHP: June 28, 1990

The Water Street Commercial Historic District in Shullsburg in Lafayette County, Wisconsin is a 7 acres (2.8 ha) historic district which was listed on the National Register of Historic Places in 1992. It included 34 contributing buildings.

It includes Shullsburg's downtown, both now and during early lead-mining. Properties include the 1847/78/84 City Hotel, the 1855/1886 Brewster House Hotel, the 1867 Greek Revival Methodist Episcopal Church, 1882 Copeland Opera House, the 1884 Italianate Merchants Union Bank, the 1884 Gothic Revival/eclectic Williams Estate Building, the 1903 Gerlach Saloon, and the 1920 20th Century Commercial-styled Gem Garage.
