= Mottley Family Farmstead =

- U.S. National Register of Historic Places
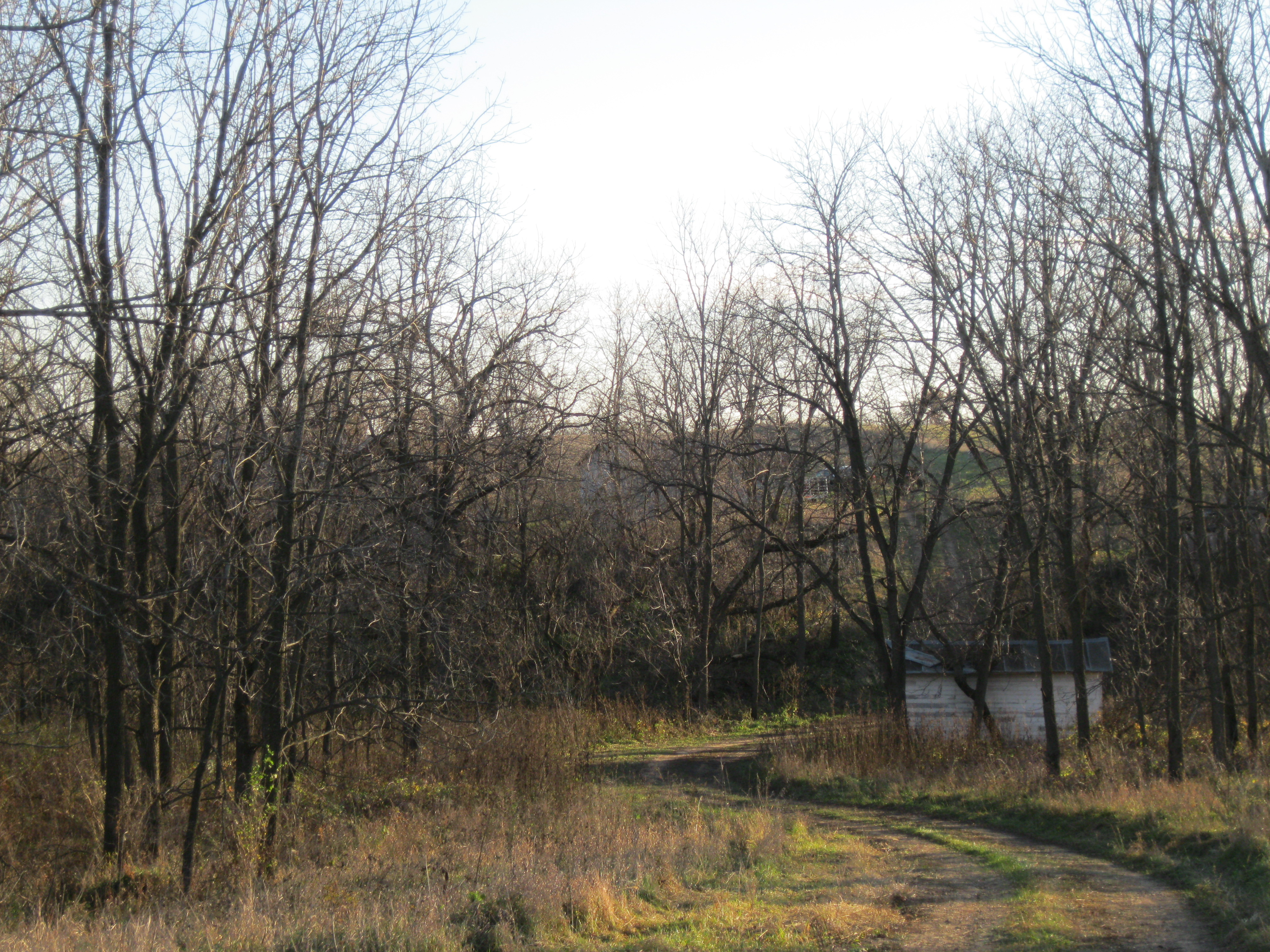

- Location within Wisconsin Location within the United States
- Location: 21496 Ivey Rd., Willow Springs, Wisconsin
- Coordinates: 42.803889°N 90.145833°W
- Area: 8 acres (3.2 ha)
- Built: 1860
- NRHP reference No.: 01000564
- Added to NRHP: May 25, 2001

The Mottley Family Farmstead on Ivey Road in Willow Springs in Lafayette County, Wisconsin is a 8 acres (3.2 ha) property which was listed on the National Register of Historic Places in 2001. The listing included three contributing buildings.

It is an abandoned farm on an isolated ravine, begun in 1854 by English immigrants Abraham and Susan Motley. Remaining are a 1 1/2-story limestone farmhouse probably begun around 1860, a bank barn, and other structures. The Motleys raised milk cows, pigs, wheat, corn and potatoes. The farm stayed in their family until 1972.
