= Samuel Mazzuchelli =

Italian Catholic missionary

Venerable Samuel Mazzuchelli OP
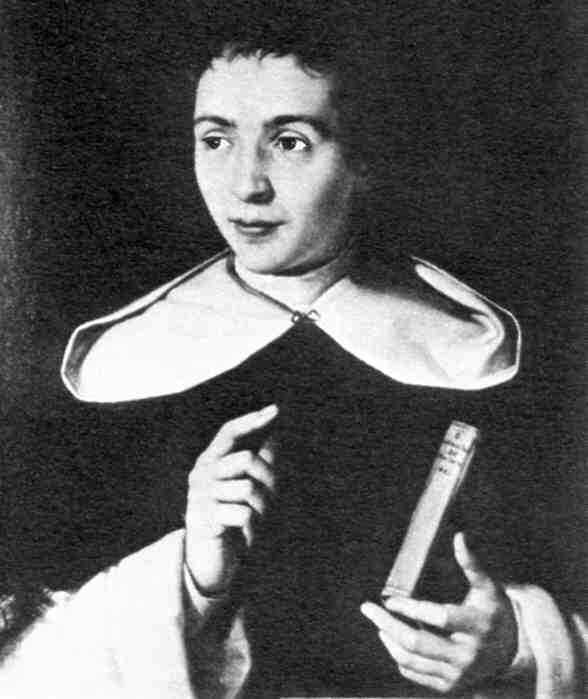
- Young Mazzuchelli

Orders
- Ordination: September 5, 1830 by Edward Fenwick

Personal details
- Born: Carlo Gaetano Samuele Mazzuchelli; November 4, 1806 Milan, French Kingdom of Italy
- Died: February 23, 1864 (aged 57) Benton, Wisconsin, United States
- Buried: St. Patrick's Cemetery, Benton
- Education: St. Rose Priory, Springfield, Kentucky

Samuel Charles Mazzuchelli, OP (birth name Carlo Gaetano Samuele Mazzuchelli) (November 4, 1806 – February 23, 1864) was a pioneer Italian Dominican friar and Catholic missionary priest who helped bring Catholicism to the Iowa-Illinois-Wisconsin tri-state area.

Mazzuchelli founded over 30 parishes in the region and was the architect for several parish buildings. Additionally, Mazzuchelli established several schools, some of which have developed into local Catholic colleges. As part of this effort, he founded the Sinsinawa Dominican Sisters.

== Life ==
=== Early life ===
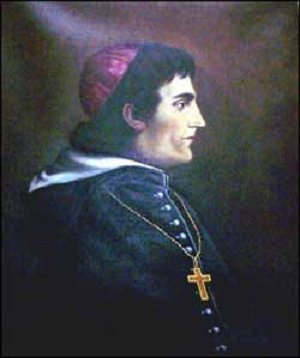
Bishop Fenwick

Samuel Mazzuchelli was born on November 4, 1806, in Milan in the Kingdom of Italy, a puppet state of France. He was the 16th of 17 children of a prominent family. After the mother died, Mazzuchelli's father sent him to a boarding school in Switzerland. When the teenage boy told his father that he wanted to become a priest, his father was doubtful. Milan and much of Europe was under the rule of the anti-clerical Napoleonic Empire of France. However, he did not oppose his son's wishes.

At age 17, Mazzuchelli entered the Dominican Order. After his period of novitiate, when he changed his name to Friar Samuel, he went to Rome to prepare for ordination. The Dominicans ordained Mazzuchelli as a subdeacon in 1827 in the Archbasilica of St. John Lateran in Rome. Around that time, while still a seminarian, he decided to serve in the new Diocese of Cincinnati in the United States. Since his father was unsure if he would see his son again, he asked him to sit for a portrait.

=== Cincinnati ===
Since many of the Catholics in the American diocese were French-Canadians and French-speaking indigenous peoples, Mazzuchelli spent several months in France to improve his French skills. In 1828, Mazzuchelli sailed for the United States, arriving in New York City after a harrowing sea voyage. At that time, he spoke no English and no idea of how to get to Cincinnati, Ohio. He was aided by his fellow Catholics in New York.

Mazzuchelli eventually arrived in Cincinnati, where was warmly welcomed by Bishop Edward Fenwick, a fellow Dominican.At that time, the Diocese of Cincinnati included all of Ohio, along with frontier territories covering present-day Michigan, Wisconsin, Minnesota, and parts of the Dakotas. Fenwick sent Mazzuchelli to the St. Rose Priory near Springfield, Kentucky, to finish his seminary studies. By 1830, he had graduated from seminary, but at age 24 he was too young for ordination. Fenwick was forced to request a dispensation from the Vatican. Mazzuchelli was ordained a priest by Fenwick on September 5, 1830.

=== Mackinac Island ===
After his ordination, Fenwick sent Mazzuchelli to work in the far northern part of the diocese in late 1830. He arrived in Mackinac Island in the Michigan Territory to become the resident priest at Sainte Anne Church. At that time, the territory included most of present-day Michigan, Wisconsin and Iowa. The Presbyterian pastor on Mackinac Island, William Ferry, was not happy to see Mazzuchelli's arrival. The priest established a Catholic school, which competed with Ferry's school.

Ferry frequently denounced Catholicism in his Sunday sermons. Mazzuchelli started attending the services, making notes on the attacks on Catholicism. In his sermons, Mazzuchelli would rebut the charges, emphasizing love and positivity. At one point, he and Ferry engaged in a public debate on points of theology. During his short time on Mackinac Island, Mazzuchelli converted a number of Protestants to Catholicism.

=== Green Bay ===
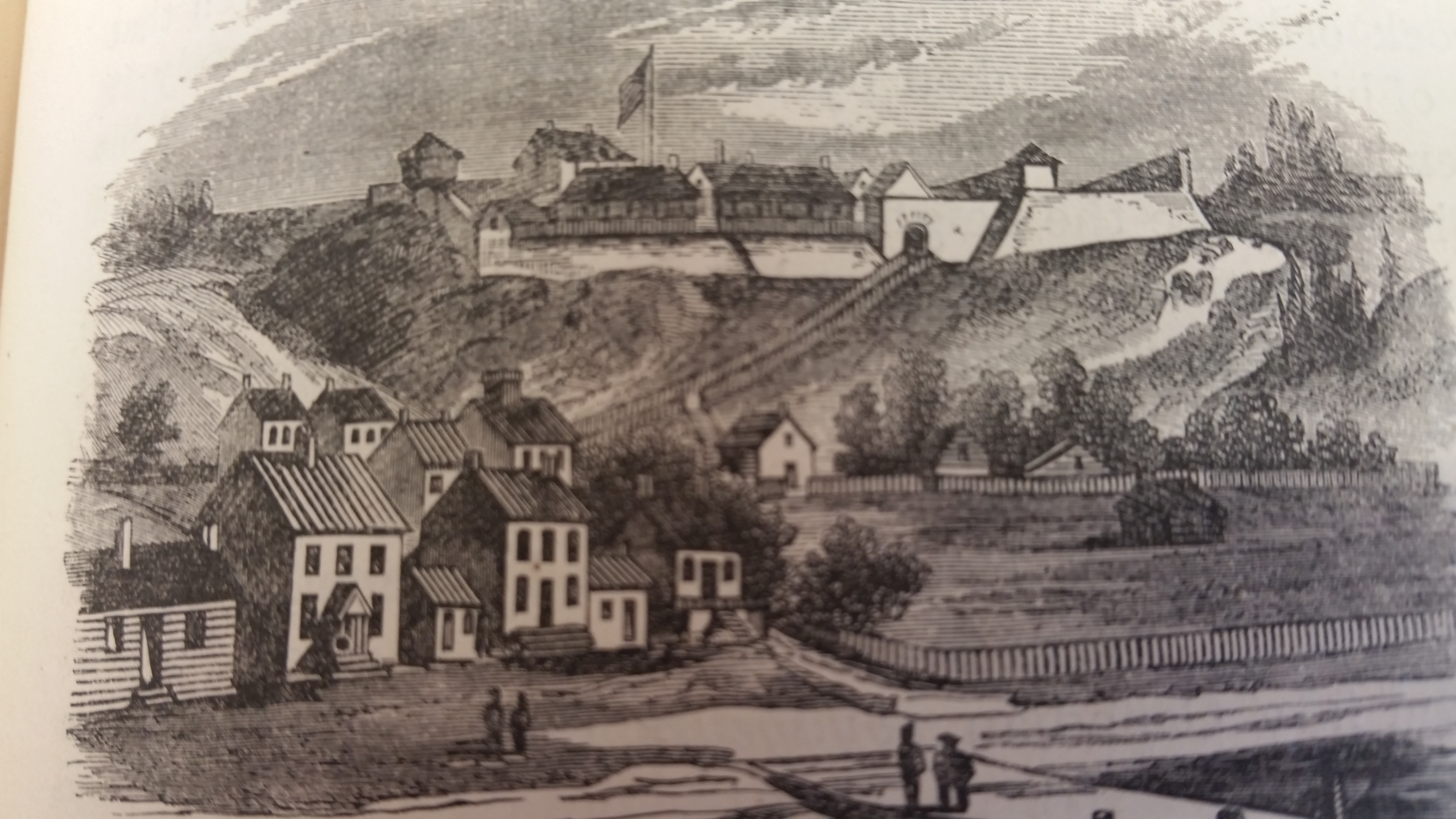
Fort Mackinac, Mackinac Island (circa 1812)

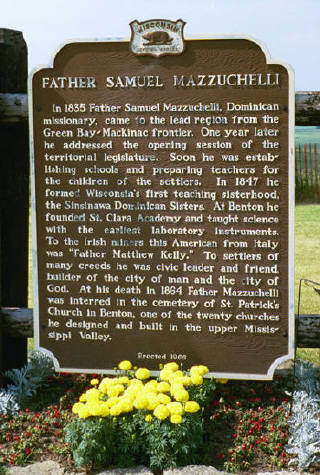
Mazzuchelli historical marker, Benton, Wisconsin

In the fall of 1831, Fenwick sent Mazzuchelli west to the settlement of Green Bay in present-day Wisconsin to minister to the French-Canadian settlers and Native Americans there. He established a school for the Menominee people. Many of them were already Catholic. He proposed a funding plan for the school, which the local Indian agent approved and sent to the Department of War in Washington, D.C. for consideration. However, despite support from the territorial governor, the Department would only consider a proposal from a competing Episcopal school. While in Green Bay, he started construction of his first church, St. John the Evangelist. It became the first Catholic church in Northern Wisconsin.

In 1833, the new commandant of Fort Mackinac, a US Army post on Mackinac Island, decreed that all his soldiers must attend Sunday service at the Calvinist chapel, including the Catholics. Mazzuchelli protested this decree until it was reversed later that summer. Referring to the officer, Mazzuchelli later remarked,

See to what extent a false belief can blind even a cultivated man; the most sacred lawę of nations are sometimes trampled underfoot because of this, even in a republic.

Also in 1833, Chief Whirling Thunder of the Winnebago people asked the Indian agent at Fort Howard in Green Bay about designating Mazzuchelli as teacher for their children at their new reservation in Prairie du Chien. However, the Indian agent there appointed a Presbyterian teacher. Mazzuchelli wrote a letter of protest to US President Andrew Jackson. That same year, he founded St. Matthew's Parish in Shullsburg, also in present-day Wisconsin. By July 1835, the letter had been passed to Colonel Zachary Taylor, a future American president, at Fort Crawford in Prairie du Chien. Taylor adamantly refused the request, accusing Mazzuchelli of being used by British sympathizers.

While ministering to the Winnebago and Menominee peoples, he quickly gained a working knowledge of their languages. He later published texts in their languages for them Winnebago and Menominee Indians of the region.

=== Dubuque ===
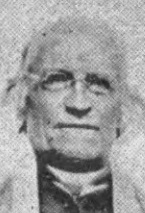
Bishop Mathias Loras

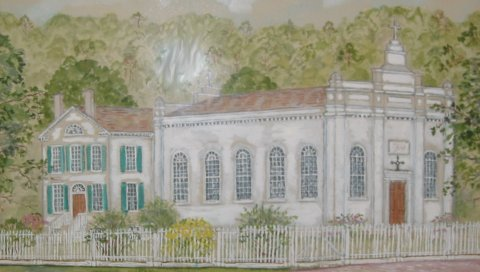
St. Raphael Church, Dubuque

In early 1835, Mazzuchelli decided to take a trip back to Cincinnati by boat, going down the Mississippi River, then up the Ohio River to Cincinnati. He stopped along the way at the small settlement of Dubuque in present-day Iowa. A lead mining town, Dubuque had no priest or church for its Catholic families. Galena, Illinois, another mining town across the Mississippi, had St. Michael's Parish, but no priest or church.

When Mazzuchelli continued his journey, the Catholics in Dubuque and Galena petitioned Bishop John Baptist Purcell in Cincinnati to assign him to their area. Purcell approved Mazzuchelli's new assignment and he quickly returned to Dubuque and Galena. As to his earlier missions to Native Americans, he was now working with European settlers and their descendents. He started building churches in both communities in July 1835, commuting across the river to supervise the two projects. Mazzuchelli named the parish in Dubuque as Saint Raphael, the first parish in present-day Iowa.

During the 1830s, waves of German and Irish Catholic immigrants started arriving in the Upper Mississippi Valley to start farms and later work on the railroads. In 1836, Mazzuchelli arrived in the new village of Davenport to establish St. Anthony's parish for the 25 Catholic families. He left them with architectural plans he had created for its first church. Today, St. Anthony's is the oldest congregation of any denomination in Davenport.

Also in 1836, the US Congress established the Wisconsin Territory, covering Iowa, Wisconsin and other areas by the Great Lakes. Mazzuchelli helped facilitate this transition, meeting with federal officials, local citizens and tribal members. He would speak to them about religious liberty and civil obligation, while praising the United States for guaranteeing religious liberty. In recognition of his service, the new territorial legislature, overwhelmingly Protestant by background, chose Mazzuchelli to address them and to serve as their first chaplain.

Pope Leo XIII erected the Diocese of Dubuque in 1837, covering most of the Wisconsin Territory. The pope named Mathias Loras as the first bishop of Dubuque. After learning that Mazzuchelli was his only priest, Loras traveled to Europe to recruit more. Mazzuchelli celebrated the first mass in December 1840 in present-day Iowa City in a small hotel in front of 28 congregants. The next year, he established St. Mary of the Assumption Parish there. When Loras returned to Dubuque in 1838 with some prospective missionaries, he and Mazzuchelli toured the parishes in the diocese.

=== Sinsinawa Mound ===
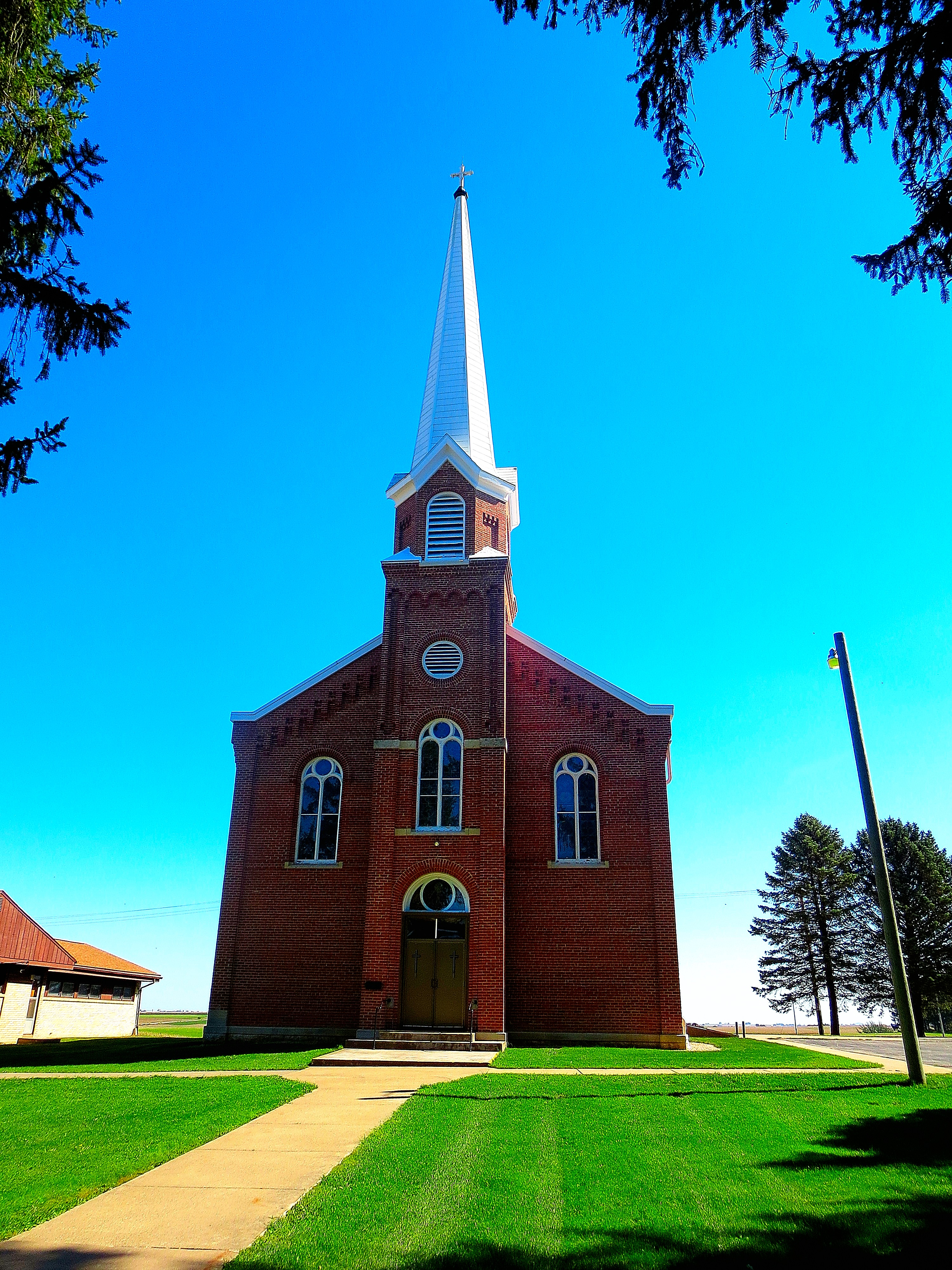
St. Joseph Chapel, Sinsinawa Mound

In May 1843, Mazzuchelli accompanied Loras to the Fifth Provincial Council of Baltimore, a meeting of bishops in Baltimore, Maryland. He served as the bishop's theologian at the meeting. Mazzuchelli had been recently experiencing some debilitating infections. After the Council adjourned, Loras convinced Mazzuchelli to sail to Italy to relax and regain his health. Once there, he saw his family in Milan for the first time in 15 years.

While in Italy, Mazzuchelli continued to work. He recruited missionaries, raised funds, and wrote Memoires, a book about his missionary work in the United States (without mentioning his name in the book). While recounting his actions as a missionary, Mazzuchelli tried to explain to his Italian readers the concept of the separation of church and state in the United States and how a Catholic could practice their religion there.

Before returning to the United States, Mazzuchelli met with the master of the Dominican Order in Rome. The master gave Mazzuchelli permission to establish a province of friars and a men's college, along with a community of Dominican Sisters, in the United States.

After coming back to Dubuque, Mazzuchelli purchased an 800 acres (320 ha) site known as Sinsinawa Mound in Sinsinawa in 1844. He founded Sinsinawa Mound College for men there in 1847. On the same location, he created his Dominican friary and established the Dominican Sisters of Sinsinawa. Today, Sinsinawa Mound just serves as the motherhouse of the Sisters of Sinsinawa. In 1848, he founded St. Clara Female Academy at Sinsinawa Mound, a school for young women run by the Sisters. Today it is Dominican University.

=== Benton ===
Mazzuchelli established St. Patrick's Parish in 1852 in Benton, Wisconsin, and built its church. The St. Clara Academy moved to Benton around this time. Mazzuchelli spent the rest of his life serving as pastor at St. Patrick's. The Irish he ministered to called Mazzuchelli "Father Matthew Kelly." When Loras died in 1858, Mazzuchelli returned to Dubuque to deliver a eulogy at the bishop's funeral service.

During the American Civil War of the early 1860s, US President Abraham Lincoln had declared a national Day of Thanksgiving in August 1963 to celebrate the recent victory by the Union Army against the Confederacy in the Battle of Vicksburg. Galena, the home town of US General Ulysses S. Grant, invited Mazzuchelli to return there to preach a sermon. Expecting a celebratory talk, parishioners were shocked when he condemned the pride of Americans for the starting of this war.

Many remembered Mazzuchelli as a kind and gentlemanly priest who was able to break down the cultural barriers between ethnic groups. He died in Benton of pneumonia at age 58 on February 23, 1864, after attending a sick call. Mazzuchelli was buried at St. Patrick's Cemetery in Benton.

== Veneration ==
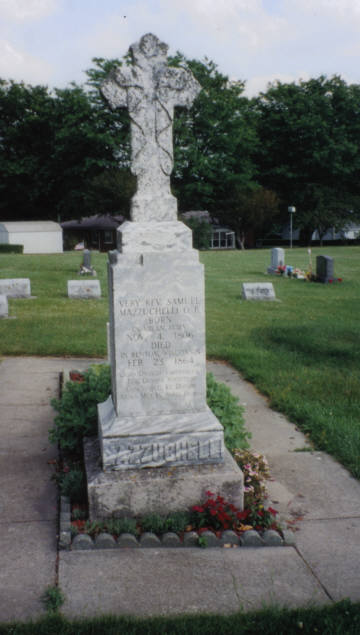
Mazzuchelli gravesite in Benton, Wisconsin

The cause for canonization for Mazzuchelli was started in 1964 when Bishop William Patrick O'Connor of Madison established a diocesan historical commission to investigate him. The Vatican approved the formal introduction of his cause in 1976. In 1993, Pope John Paul II declared Mazzuchelli to be venerable.

In 2001, Robert Uselmann of Monona, Wisconsin, had been diagnosed with lung cancer. His doctors gave a prognosis of two years to live. Uselmann and his family traveled to Sinsinawa Mound to pray for Mazzuchelli's intercession. The Sisters of Sinsinawa prayed with him, using Mazzuchelli's penance chain. Medical testing later showed that the cancerous tumor had disappeared from his lung.

Bishop Robert C. Morlino of Madison opened a tribunal to investigate the Uselmann case for the beatification of Mazzuchelli in 2006. This came at the request of the Sisters of Sinsinawa. To be beatified, the Vatican must validate at least one miracle due to the intercession of the subject. The tribunal then sent its report to the Vatican. However, the panel of doctors used by the Vatican determined that the Uselmann cure was not a miracle.

== Legacy ==
=== Institutions ===
The Mazzuchelli archives are located at the Sisters of Sinsinawa motherhouse in Sinsinawa. The Mazzuchelli Rectory Museum is on the grounds of St. Patrick's Church in Benton. The following institutions bear his namesake:

- Mazzuchelli Catholic School in Dubuque opened in 2006.
- Mazzuchelli Hall at Dominican University
- Mazzuchelli Institute of Mission and Leadership, formed by Diocese of Madison to encourage evangelism

=== Parishes founded by Mazzuchelli ===
This list is incomplete. You can help by adding to it.

Parish	Location	Year	Ecclesiastical territory	Photo
St. John the Evangelist Parish (Current church dedicated in 1915)	Green Bay, Wisconsin	1831	Diocese of Green Bay	
St. Matthew's Parish (Current church dedicated in 1861)	Shullsburg, Wisconsin	1833	Diocese of Madison	
St. Raphael's Cathedral Parish (Cathedral dedicated in 1861)	Dubuque, Iowa	1833, 1835	Archdiocese of Dubuque	
St. Thomas Parish	Potosi, Wisconsin	1836	Diocese of Madison	
St. Anthony's Parish (Church dedicated in 1839)	Davenport, Iowa	1837	Diocese of Davenport	
St. Paul's Church (Current church dedicated in 1895)	Burlington, Iowa	1839	Diocese of Davenport	
St. Patrick's Church (Current church dedicated in 1875)	Garryowen, Iowa	1840	Archdiocese of Dubuque	
St. Mary's Church (Current church dedicated in 1869)	Iowa City, Iowa	1840	Diocese of Davenport	
St. Mathias Church	Muscatine, Iowa The church was built in Prairie du Chien, Wisconsin, then floated down the Mississippi River to Muscatine.	1842	Diocese of Davenport	
St. Augustine Church (Church dedicated in 1844)	New Diggings, Wisconsin	1844	Diocese of Madison	
St. Rose of Lima (Current church dedicated in 1968)	Cuba City, Wisconsin	1851	Diocese of Madison	
St. Patrick's Church (Church dedicated in 1852)	Benton, Wisconsin	1852	Diocese of Madison	

== See also ==
- Dominican Order
- History of the Catholic Church in the United States
- List of venerated American Catholics
