= New Diggings, Wisconsin =

- Town
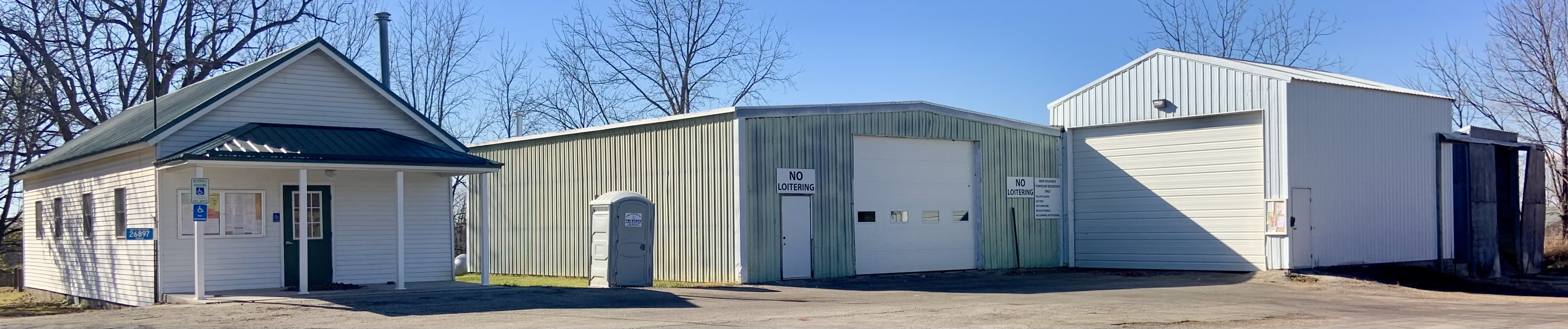
- Town hall in Lead Mine

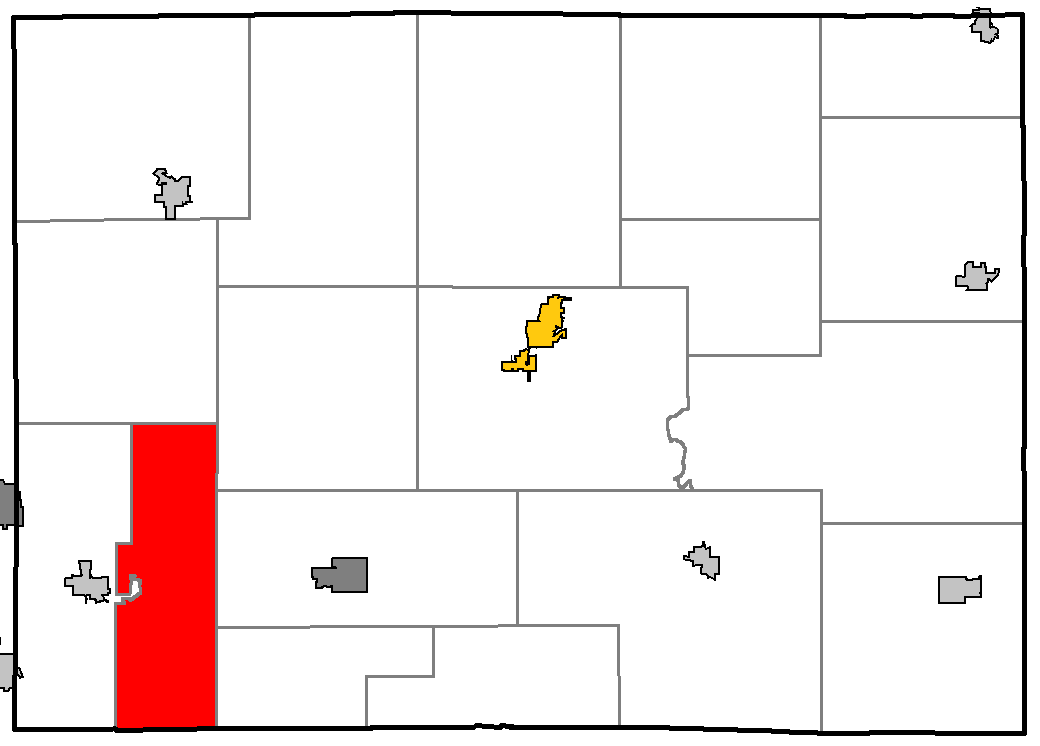
- Location of New Diggings, within Lafayette County, Wisconsin

- Location of Lafayette County, Wisconsin
- Coordinates: 42°33′53″N 90°19′59″W
- Country: United States
- State: Wisconsin
- County: Lafayette

Area
  - Total: 25.28 sq mi (65.47 km^{2})
  - Land: 25.28 sq mi (65.47 km^{2})
  - Water: 0 sq mi (0 km^{2})
- Elevation: 856 ft (261 m)

Population (2020)
  - Total: 486
  - Density: 19.2/sq mi (7.42/km^{2})
- Time zone: UTC-6 (Central (CST))
  - Summer (DST): UTC-5 (CDT)
- ZIP Codes: 53807 (Cuba City); 53803 (Benton); 53586 (Shullsburg)
- Area code: 608
- FIPS code: 55-56625
- GNIS feature ID: 1583804

New Diggings is a town in Lafayette County, Wisconsin, United States. The population was 486 at the 2020 census, down from 502 in 2010. The unincorporated communities of Etna, Lead Mine, and New Diggings are located in the town.

== Geography ==
The town is in southwestern Lafayette County and is bordered to the south by Jo Daviess County in Illinois. According to the United States Census Bureau, the town has a total area of 25.3 square miles (65.5 km^{2}), all land. The town is drained by the Galena River, a southward-flowing waterway that meanders back and forth across the western border of the town before entering Illinois.

== Demographics ==
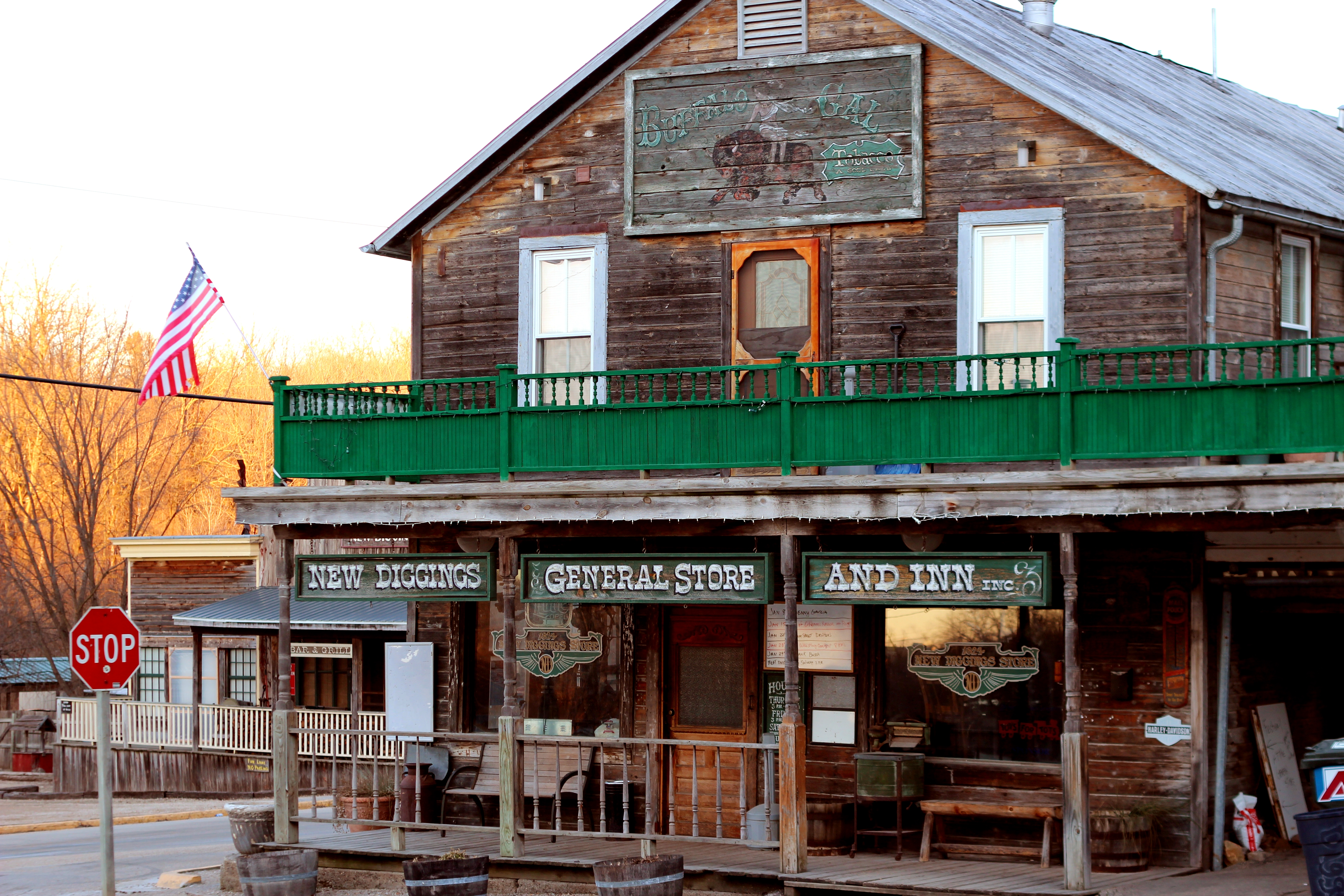
Storefront of the New Diggings General Store and Inn

Historical population
Census	Pop.	Note	%±
2000	473		—
2010	502		6.1%
2020	486		−3.2%

As of the census of 2000, there were 473 people, 176 households, and 127 families residing in the town. The population density was 18.7 people per square mile (7.2/km^{2}). There were 194 housing units at an average density of 7.7 per square mile (3/km^{2}). The racial makeup of the town was 99.15% White, 0.21% Native American and 0.63% Asian.

There were 176 households, out of which 31.8% had children under the age of 18 living with them, 59.7% were married couples living together, 4% had a female householder with no husband present, and 27.8% were non-families. 23.9% of all households were made up of individuals, and 11.4% had someone living alone who was 65 years of age or older. The average household size was 2.69 and the average family size was 3.21.

In the town, the population was spread out, with 28.5% under the age of 18, 6.6% from 18 to 24, 28.8% from 25 to 44, 23% from 45 to 64, and 13.1% who were 65 years of age or older. The median age was 38 years. For every 100 females, there were 110.2 males. For every 100 females age 18 and over, there were 108.6 males.

The median income for a household in the town was $41,250, and the median income for a family was $50,114. Males had a median income of $31,667 versus $20,750 for females. The per capita income for the town was $17,122. About 3.3% of families and 6.4% of the population were below the poverty line, including 5.7% of those under age 18 and 3.9% of those age 65 or over.

== Notable people ==
- Montgomery Morrison Cothren, Wisconsin legislator and jurist
- Thomas Cruson, Wisconsin territorial legislator
- Frederick Hird, shooter in the 1912 Olympics; born in New Diggings
- Francis Little, Wisconsin state senator and chairman of the Town Board of New Diggings
- Samuel Mazzuchelli, founder of Saint Augustine Church in New Diggings
- Daniel Morgan Parkinson, Wisconsin state representative
- Thomas J.B. Robinson, U.S. representative from Iowa; born in New Diggings
- Fred Smith, major league baseball player; born in New Diggings
