= Sinsinawa, Wisconsin =

- Unincorporated community
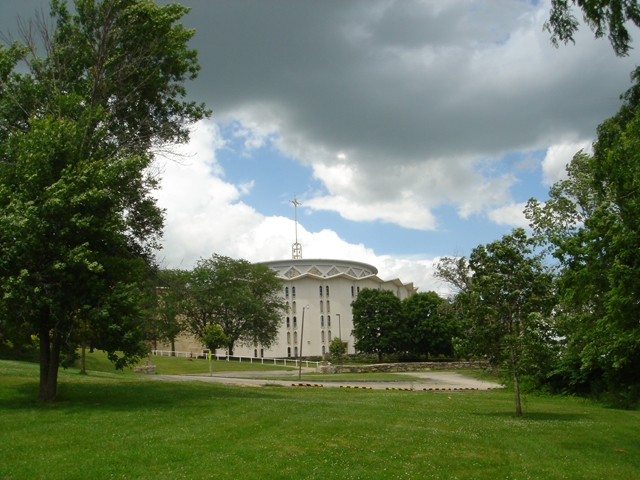
- Sinsinawa

- Location within the state of Wisconsin Sinsinawa (the United States)
- Coordinates: 42°31′25″N 90°32′21″W
- Country: United States
- State: Wisconsin
- County: Grant
- Towns: Jamestown, Hazel Green
- Time zone: UTC-6 (Central (CST))
  - Summer (DST): UTC-5 (CDT)
- Area code: 608

Sinsinawa (/ˌsɪnˈsɪnəwɑː/) is an unincorporated community in Grant County, Wisconsin, United States. The community is in the towns of Jamestown and Hazel Green, one mile north of the border with Illinois. The community is 7 1/2 miles (12.1 km) east of Dubuque, Iowa, and 6 1/2 miles (10.5 km) west of the village of Hazel Green. The town is best known for being the mother house of the Sinsinawa Dominican Sisters.

== History ==
The community's name means either "rattlesnake" or "Home of the Young Eagle" in Sioux. The first white settler in the area was George Wallace Jones, who purchased land for a lead smelter in 1827. He soon sold the land to the Dominican priest Samuel Mazzuchelli, who subsequently built a men's college, Sinsinawa Mound College, in 1846. Mazzuchelli founded the Sinsinawa Dominican Sisters in 1847. This religious order founded a women's college and high school in Sinsinawa in 1865.

== Sinsinawa Mound ==
Sinsinawa Mound is a cone-shaped hill in the area, from which the area gets its name. Sinsinawa River runs along the hill south towards the Mississippi River in Illinois.

The Sinsinawa Mound raid of June 29, 1832, part of the Black Hawk War, took place near Sinsinawa Mound. In August 2007 there was a commemoration of the 175th anniversary on the war.
