= Benton, Wisconsin =

Village in Lafayette County, Wisconsin

- Village
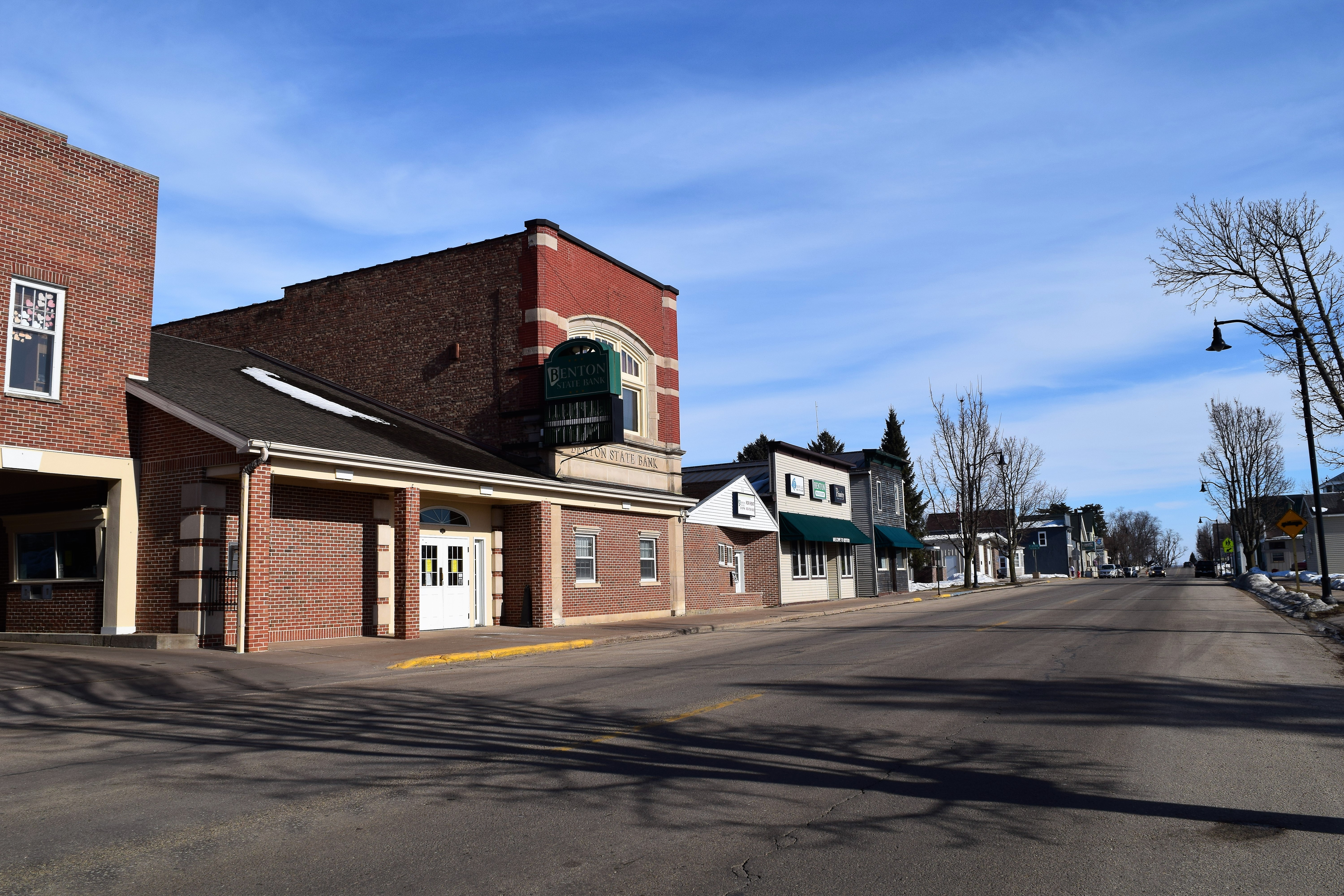
- Wisconsin Highway 11 in Downtown Benton from the west

- Location of Benton in Lafayette County, Wisconsin.
- Coordinates: 42°33′35″N 90°23′49″W
- Country: United States
- State: Wisconsin
- County: Lafayette

Area
  - Total: 0.84 sq mi (2.18 km^{2})
  - Land: 0.84 sq mi (2.18 km^{2})
  - Water: 0 sq mi (0.00 km^{2})
- Elevation: 860 ft (262 m)

Population (2020)
  - Total: 946
  - Density: 1,120/sq mi (434/km^{2})
- Time zone: UTC-6 (Central (CST))
  - Summer (DST): UTC-5 (CDT)
- Area code: 608
- FIPS code: 55-06850
- GNIS feature ID: 1582795
- Website: www.bentonwi.us

Benton is a village in Lafayette County, Wisconsin, United States. The population was 946 at the 2020 census. The village is surrounded by the Town of Benton.

== History ==
Benton was named for Thomas Hart Benton, a U.S. senator from Missouri. Up until that point, the community was known as Swindler's Ridge.

The pioneer priest Father Samuel Mazzuchelli founded the village's Catholic parish, Saint Patrick's Church. Father Mazzuchelli is buried in Saint Patrick's cemetery. He was declared Venerable by Pope John Paul II in 1993, and the case for his Sainthood is still pending.

== Geography ==
Benton is located at 42°34′15″N 90°23′3″W (42.570836, -90.38437).

According to the United States Census Bureau, the village has a total area of 0.84 square miles (2.18 km^{2}), all land.

== Demographics ==
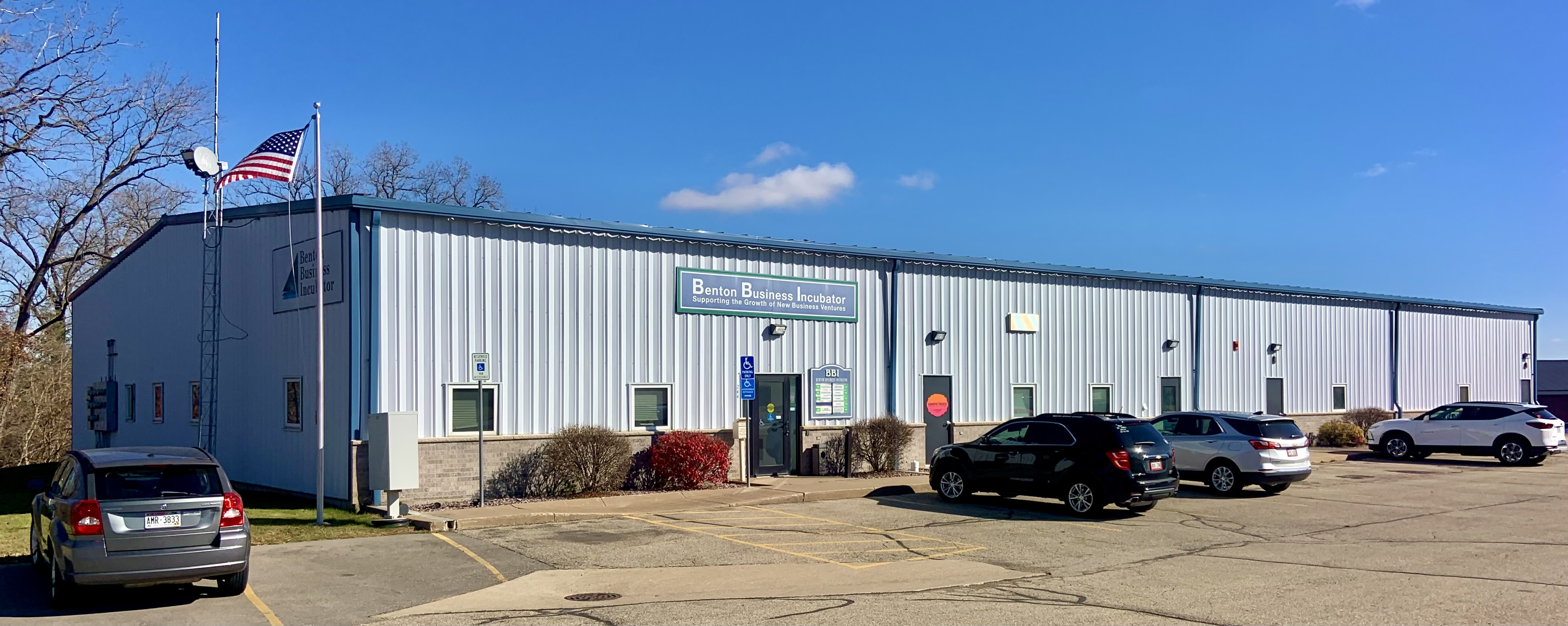
Benton Village Hall, also a business incubator inside.

Historical population
Census	Pop.	Note	%±
1880	254		—
1890	414		63.0%
1900	546		31.9%
1910	652		19.4%
1920	874		34.0%
1930	869		−0.6%
1940	835		−3.9%
1950	842		0.8%
1960	837		−0.6%
1970	873		4.3%
1980	983		12.6%
1990	898		−8.6%
2000	976		8.7%
2010	973		−0.3%
2020	946		−2.8%
U.S. Decennial Census

=== 2010 census ===
As of the census of 2010, there were 973 people, 398 households, and 264 families residing in the village. The population density was 1,158.3 inhabitants per square mile (447.2/km^{2}). There were 426 housing units at an average density of 507.1 per square mile (195.8/km^{2}). The racial makeup of the village was 98.5% White, 0.1% African American, 0.7% Native American, 0.3% Asian, 0.1% from other races, and 0.3% from two or more races. Hispanic or Latino of any race were 0.4% of the population.

There were 398 households, of which 30.4% had children under the age of 18 living with them, 52.8% were married couples living together, 8.5% had a female householder with no husband present, 5.0% had a male householder with no wife present, and 33.7% were non-families. 28.6% of all households were made up of individuals, and 13.1% had someone living alone who was 65 years of age or older. The average household size was 2.44 and the average family size was 3.00.

The median age in the village was 39.6 years. 25.5% of residents were under the age of 18; 8.4% were between the ages of 18 and 24; 21.7% were from 25 to 44; 29.6% were from 45 to 64; and 14.7% were 65 years of age or older. The gender makeup of the village was 49.2% male and 50.8% female.

=== 2000 census ===
As of the census of 2000, there were 976 people, 393 households, and 260 families residing in the village. The population density was 1,170.2 people per square mile (454.0/km^{2}). There were 417 housing units at an average density of 500.0 per square mile (194.0/km^{2}). The racial makeup of the village was 98.36% White, 0.10% Black or African American, 0.10% Native American, 1.23% Asian, 0.10% Pacific Islander, and 0.10% from two or more races. 0.00% of the population were Hispanic or Latino of any race.

There were 393 households, out of which 30.0% had children under the age of 18 living with them, 55.0% were married couples living together, 7.4% had a female householder with no husband present, and 33.6% were non-families. 28.8% of all households were made up of individuals, and 13.7% had someone living alone who was 65 years of age or older. The average household size was 2.48 and the average family size was 3.09.

In the village, the population was spread out, with 26.7% under the age of 18, 8.1% from 18 to 24, 26.0% from 25 to 44, 25.5% from 45 to 64, and 13.6% who were 65 years of age or older. The median age was 37 years. For every 100 females, there were 92.5 males. For every 100 females age 18 and over, there were 88.7 males.

The median income for a household in the village was $30,313, and the median income for a family was $41,518. Males had a median income of $28,882 versus $21,250 for females. The per capita income for the village was $15,702. About 4.5% of families and 7.5% of the population were below the poverty line, including 5.1% of those under age 18 and 12.8% of those age 65 or over.

== Education ==
Benton School District operates public schools.

== Notable people ==
- Walter B. Calvert - Wisconsin State Representative
- Charlie Emery - founder of Spooky Pinball
- Jacob Fawcett - Chief Justice of the Nebraska Supreme Court
- Thomas K. Gibson - Wisconsin State Senator
- Samuel Mazzuchelli O.P. (1806–1864) a pioneer Italian Catholic missionary priest
- Dennis Murphy - Wisconsin State Senator
