= Darlington, Wisconsin =

- City
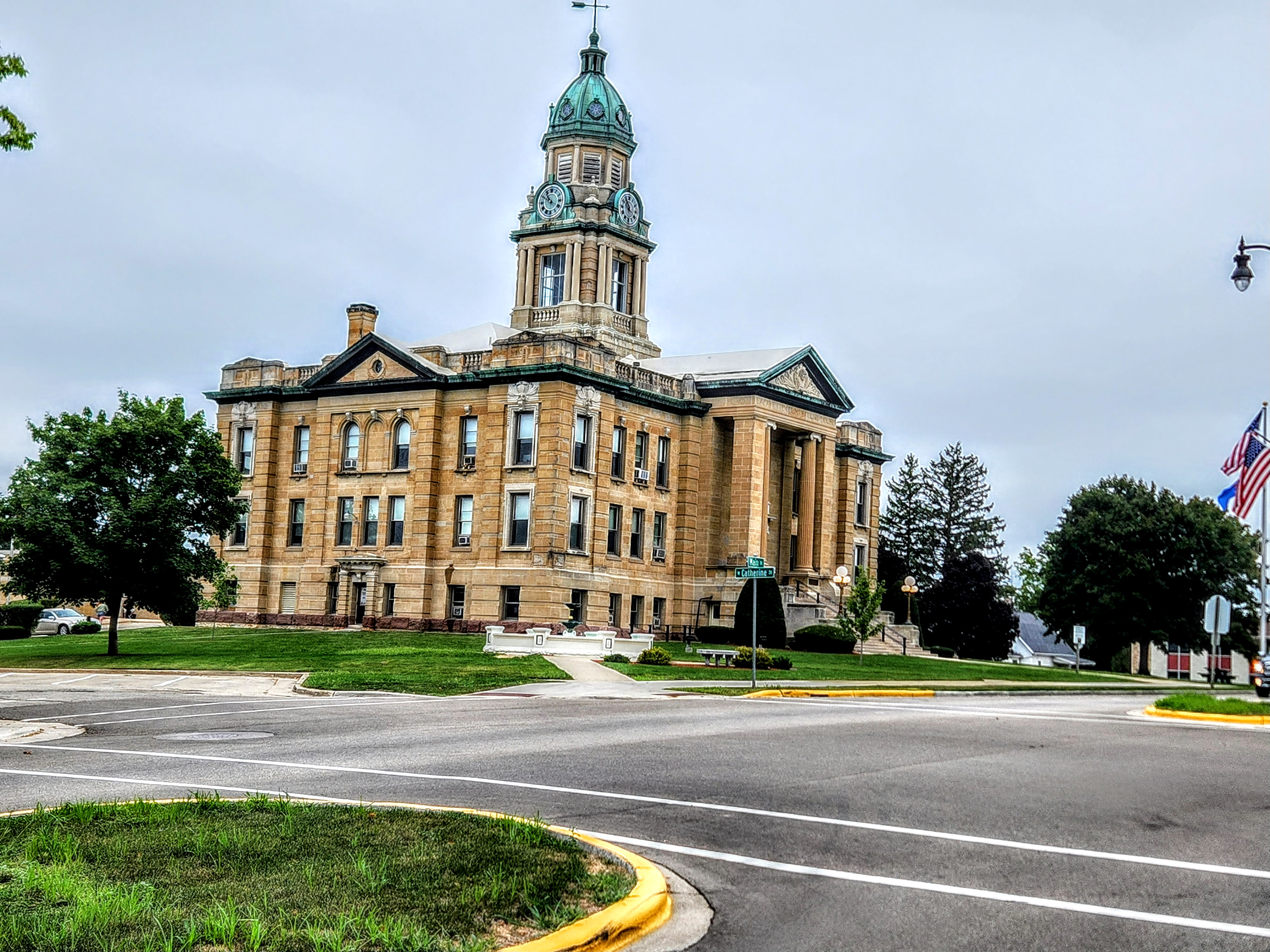
- Lafayette County Courthouse

- Logo

- Location of Darlington in Lafayette County, Wisconsin.

- Location within Wisconsin Location within the United States
- Coordinates: 42°40′59″N 90°07′03″W
- Country: United States
- State: Wisconsin
- County: Lafayette

Government
  - Mayor: Dave Roelli

Area
  - Total: 1.65 sq mi (4.27 km^{2})
  - Land: 1.65 sq mi (4.27 km^{2})
  - Water: 0 sq mi (0.00 km^{2})
- Elevation: 869 ft (265 m)

Population (2020)
  - Total: 2,462
  - Density: 1,494.8/sq mi (577.1/km^{2})
- Time zone: UTC-6 (Central (CST))
  - Summer (DST): UTC-5 (CDT)
- ZIP codes: 53530
- Area code: 608
- FIPS code: 55-18875
- GNIS feature ID: 1563718
- Website: darlingtonwi.org

Darlington is a city in and the county seat of Lafayette County, Wisconsin, United States. The population was 2,462 at the 2020 census. The city is surrounded by the Town of Darlington.

== History ==
The first residence within the city limits of Darlington was a log house owned by Jamison Hamilton in 1836. He laid out the village of Avon, or Centre, in 1847. Darlington was first organized in 1849, but was known for a long time as the town of Centre. The first town meeting was held on April 3, 1849, with 82 votes being cast.

The first store was built in 1848. Two more were started in 1851, a millinery shop run by Miss Graham and a store run by Mr. Driver. The first hardware store was opened in 1852 by the Willett Brothers, and the first drug store was opened by J. Collins and Dr. Blair, who was the first resident physician in the city. The first school was opened in the winter of 1850, with 15 students. The first religious services were held some time in 1851 in the barn of Jamison Hamilton. The Mineral Point Railroad reached the town in the fall of 1856, and the citizens were very pleased that their dream of expanding their "village" was finally coming true.

In 1857, the county seat was moved from Shullsburg to Darlington, and the courthouse was built using county funds (Other reports assert this county court house is the only one in Wisconsin, paid for with a charitable gift. The donor has been described as a successful mineral miner in the county.). The courthouse was also moved to Darlington in 1861, and in 1869 the town of Centre became known as Darlington. The name was changed because Joshua Darling purchased the land in 1850 with the help of J.M. Keep and J.B. Lynde. The survey of the original streets and blocks of the community took place in June 1850 by Josiah Richardson and H. H. Gray, assisted by an Indian named January.

The streets of the town were named after the wives of the planners and prominent men of the town, such as Minerva, Mary, Harriet, Lucy, Louisa, and Cornelia. "Minerva was the wife of James G. Knight, the first president of the village, and Mary was the wife of Josepheus Driver, one of the first businessmen of Darlington. Harriet was the wife of Hamilton Gray, and Lucy was the wife of William K. Jackman. Louisa was the wife of Isaah Stockwell, and Cornelia was the wife of James M. Keep, one of the original founders of the community." He also aided Joshua Darling in the purchase of the land.

=== Ringling Brothers circus ===
Alfred T. Ringling established himself in Darlington, Wisconsin at the age of 20, working as a harness maker in his own shop. He gave little shows for the students in schools and citizens of Darlington and the surrounding towns, with an act that included having four strong farmers lift up a plow, with Alfred lying beneath it. They positioned the plow so Alfred could balance it on his chin. It was a major crowd pleaser.

The Parson Brothers, Joe and Alfred E. "Butch" Parson, from Darlington were also interested in the circus. Joe Parson, the older of the two, worked in a lumber camp in the winter months in the 1870s. It was said that he bought a bison that he saw grazing in a field one spring when he was returning from the lumber camp. He made a deal with the farmer that owned it, and Joe gave the farmer his horse in exchange for the bison. Joe started showing his bison at carnivals and festivals, and he purchased a few more animals to form a show he called "The Great Palace Show". Alfred Ringling, or Al, worked in the Parson Brother's show as a ropewalker in 1881 and most likely 1882. He also worked in Parson's "Great Grecian Show" in 1883.

When the Ringling Brothers (Alfred T., John, Charles, and Otto) were planning their own circus, they invited the Parson Brothers to join them in 1884. The Ringlings had their own band, with Al playing the bass drum, John the cornet, and Charles and Otto the trombone and tuba. John was the leader of their band. The Parsons joined the Ringlings in 1887. Joe Parson did horseback-riding stunts and also performed on the high wire. Butch Parson ran the concession wagon, selling items such as pink lemonade, peanuts, popcorn, Cracker Jacks, cigars, and paper fans. Butch managed the stand and paid a monthly sum to the Ringlings, hired his own help. The Ringlings stored and took care of his concession wagon for him.

Both sets of brothers worked well with each other for a time until the Ringling Brothers felt that the Parson Brothers were making more than them with the concession wagon. In 1906, the Parsons cleared around $30,000, for a 44% profit. The Ringlings wanted to run the concessions by themselves so they could clear more of a profit. Through a series of letters, Otto Ringling tried to sever the ties to the Parsons in December 1907. At first, the letters were formal, requesting that the Parsons allow the Ringlings to run the stand. By November 1908, Otto Ringling wrote to Butch Parson completely ending the relationship between the two families. In the letter, he said that the Ringlings could no longer store the concession wagon because of lack of space. Although their relationship with the Ringlings ended, the Parsons had become very wealthy from the concession wagon.

== Geography ==
According to the United States Census Bureau, the city has a total area of 1.34 square miles (3.47 km^{2}), all land.

=== Climate ===
According to the Köppen Climate Classification system, Darlington has a warm-summer humid continental climate, abbreviated "Dfb" on climate maps. The hottest temperature recorded in Darlington was 107 °F (41.7 °C) on July 13–14, 1936, while the coldest temperature recorded was −41 °F (−40.6 °C) on January 30, 1951.

Climate data for Darlington, Wisconsin, 1991–2020 normals, extremes 1901–present
Month	Jan	Feb	Mar	Apr	May	Jun	Jul	Aug	Sep	Oct	Nov	Dec	Year
Record high °F (°C)	59 (15)	71 (22)	84 (29)	93 (34)	104 (40)	104 (40)	107 (42)	102 (39)	100 (38)	91 (33)	79 (26)	71 (22)	107 (42)
Mean daily maximum °F (°C)	27.3 (−2.6)	31.8 (−0.1)	44.3 (6.8)	57.7 (14.3)	69.4 (20.8)	78.9 (26.1)	82.2 (27.9)	80.5 (26.9)	73.8 (23.2)	60.9 (16.1)	45.5 (7.5)	32.6 (0.3)	57.1 (13.9)
Daily mean °F (°C)	17.8 (−7.9)	21.6 (−5.8)	33.6 (0.9)	46.2 (7.9)	57.8 (14.3)	67.8 (19.9)	71.0 (21.7)	69.0 (20.6)	61.1 (16.2)	49.0 (9.4)	35.7 (2.1)	23.8 (−4.6)	46.2 (7.9)
Mean daily minimum °F (°C)	8.4 (−13.1)	11.5 (−11.4)	22.9 (−5.1)	34.7 (1.5)	46.1 (7.8)	56.7 (13.7)	59.7 (15.4)	57.5 (14.2)	48.4 (9.1)	37.2 (2.9)	25.8 (−3.4)	15.0 (−9.4)	35.3 (1.9)
Record low °F (°C)	−41 (−41)	−39 (−39)	−33 (−36)	−1 (−18)	20 (−7)	30 (−1)	39 (4)	29 (−2)	21 (−6)	−2 (−19)	−20 (−29)	−33 (−36)	−41 (−41)
Average precipitation inches (mm)	1.31 (33)	1.43 (36)	2.02 (51)	3.89 (99)	4.18 (106)	5.29 (134)	4.22 (107)	4.36 (111)	4.10 (104)	2.80 (71)	2.35 (60)	1.69 (43)	37.64 (955)
Average snowfall inches (cm)	11.3 (29)	9.2 (23)	4.6 (12)	1.0 (2.5)	0.6 (1.5)	0.0 (0.0)	0.0 (0.0)	0.0 (0.0)	0.0 (0.0)	0.6 (1.5)	2.2 (5.6)	6.2 (16)	35.7 (91.1)
Average precipitation days (≥ 0.01 in)	6.4	6.2	6.2	9.4	10.3	10.1	7.9	7.0	8.2	7.2	6.2	6.3	91.4
Average snowy days (≥ 0.1 in)	4.8	3.8	1.7	0.5	0.1	0.0	0.0	0.0	0.0	0.2	1.1	3.6	15.8
Source 1: NOAA
Source 2: National Weather Service

== Demographics ==
Historical population
Census	Pop.	Note	%±
1880	1,372		—
1890	1,589		15.8%
1900	1,808		13.8%
1910	1,808		0.0%
1920	1,798		−0.6%
1930	1,764		−1.9%
1940	2,002		13.5%
1950	2,174		8.6%
1960	2,349		8.0%
1970	2,351		0.1%
1980	2,300		−2.2%
1990	2,235		−2.8%
2000	2,418		8.2%
2010	2,451		1.4%
2020	2,462		0.4%
U.S. Decennial Census

=== 2020 census ===
As of the census of 2020, the population was 2,462. The population density was 1,494.8 inhabitants per square mile (577.1/km^{2}). There were 1,066 housing units at an average density of 647.2 per square mile (249.9/km^{2}). The racial makeup of the city was 75.1% White, 0.5% Asian, 0.4% Native American, 0.4% Black or African American, 15.6% from other races, and 7.9% from two or more races. Ethnically, the population was 23.7% Hispanic or Latino of any race.

=== 2010 census ===
As of the census of 2010, there were 2,451 people, 994 households, and 623 families residing in the city. The population density was 1,829.1 inhabitants per square mile (706.2/km^{2}). There were 1,082 housing units at an average density of 807.5 per square mile (311.8/km^{2}). The racial makeup of the city was 89.5% White, 0.3% African American, 0.5% Native American, 0.2% Asian, 8.5% from other races, and 0.9% from two or more races. Hispanic or Latino of any race were 12.1% of the population.

There were 994 households, of which 30.9% had children under the age of 18 living with them, 45.9% were married couples living together, 11.5% had a female householder with no husband present, 5.3% had a male householder with no wife present, and 37.3% were non-families. 31.5% of all households were made up of individuals, and 15.6% had someone living alone who was 65 years of age or older. The average household size was 2.37 and the average family size was 2.92.

The median age in the city was 38.7 years. 23.5% of residents were under the age of 18; 10.6% were between the ages of 18 and 24; 23.1% were from 25 to 44; 24.4% were from 45 to 64; and 18.4% were 65 years of age or older. The gender makeup of the city was 50.1% male and 49.9% female.

=== 2000 census ===
As of the census of 2000, there were 2,418 people, 985 households, and 639 families residing in the city. The population density was 1,852.8 people per square mile (712.7/km^{2}). There were 1,052 housing units at an average density of 806.1 per square mile (310.1/km^{2}). The racial makeup of the city was 99.13% White, 0.04% Black or African American, 0.04% Native American, 0.08% Asian, 0.17% Pacific Islander, 0.25% from other races, and 0.29% from two or more races. 1.12% of the population were Hispanic or Latino of any race.

There were 985 households, out of which 31.4% had children under the age of 18 living with them, 51.6% were married couples living together, 11.1% had a female householder with no husband present, and 35.1% were non-families. 32.1% of all households were made up of individuals, and 18.8% had someone living alone who was 65 years of age or older. The average household size was 2.35 and the average family size was 2.96.

In the city, the population was spread out, with 25.4% under the age of 18, 7.5% from 18 to 24, 24.8% from 25 to 44, 20.1% from 45 to 64, and 22.2% who were 65 years of age or older. The median age was 40 years. For every 100 females, there were 86.9 males. For every 100 females age 18 and over, there were 82.5 males.

The median income for a household in the city was $34,539, and the median income for a family was $44,048. Males had a median income of $30,238 versus $22,033 for females. The per capita income for the city was $17,403. About 5.9% of families and 9.9% of the population were below the poverty line, including 16.8% of those under age 18 and 10.5% of those age 65 or over.

== Economy ==
As a rural county seat, Darlington's economy is dominated by local government and farm service and food manufacturing related to the Wisconsin dairy industry. Major employers in the city include Lafayette County government, a Sigma Alimentos Mexican cheese and cream plant, and Wisconsin Whey Protein. Employment in the dairy industry has attracted a growing number of Hispanic and Latino immigrants to Darlington since the year 2000.

== Education ==
Darlington is served by the Darlington Community Schools district.

Darlington High School contains grades 9 through 12. In 2020-2021 there were 245 students with about 21 full-time teachers, and a student-teacher ratio of about 11.6 students per teacher. The school mascot is the Redbird.

Darlington Elementary-Middle School serves children in pre-kindergarten through 8th grade. In 2020–2021, there were 680 students with a student-teacher ratio of 14.3 students to every teacher.

== Attractions ==
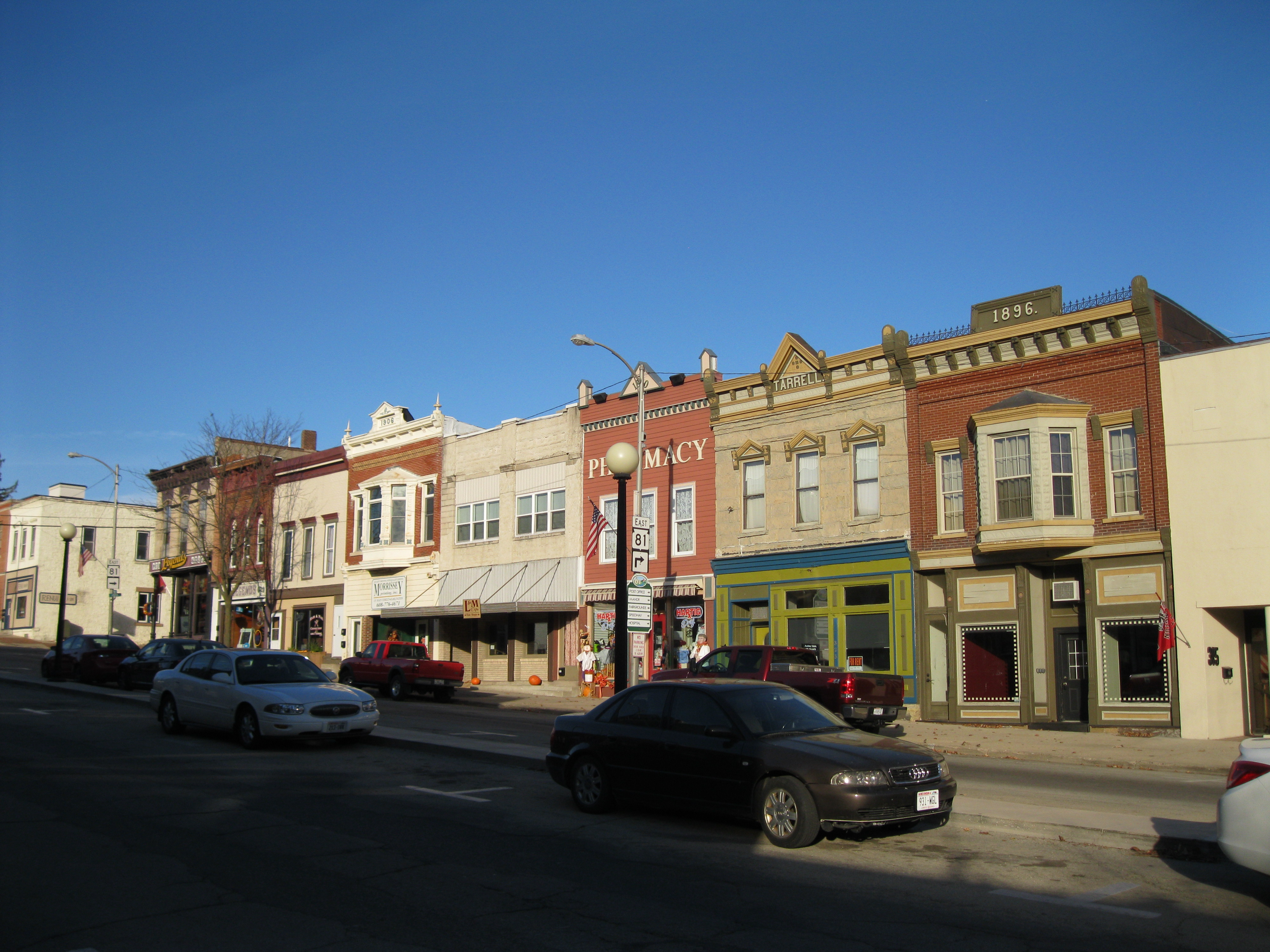
Main Street Historic District

Darlington's Main Street Historic District is listed on the National Register of Historic Places. Darlington calls itself the "Pearl of the Pecatonica" because the Pecatonica River flows through the town, and people used to harvest the clams out of the river to make pearl button blanks.

The Pecatonica River Trails Park is a city-maintained campground with 24 sites of river-front camping. There is also a paved walking/biking trail that follows the River through town. Many people also canoe and fish in the Pecatonica River. Darlington has a public swimming pool that is open every day from June until August. Riverside Park has a softball field, basketball court, and playground, and Black Bridge Park has sand volleyball courts, soccer field, and flag football field. The community has a Veterans Memorial Park and Festival Grounds.

Darlington is near Yellowstone Lake State Park, where there is swimming, camping, fishing, and boating. The Darlington Golf & Country Club has a nine-hole golf course. The Cheese Country Recreational Trail, which is over 50 miles long, can be used by ATV riders. It passes through Monroe Belmont, and Mineral Point.

During the summer, there are Friday night stock car races, and a county fair. A Cinco de Mayo celebration is held near the river in May. Darlington hosts the annual Canoe Fest in June, where there are canoe races, live music, a carnival, and a parade. The Lafayette County Fair is in July and has displays of livestock, a midway, a carnival, and a concert. Pecatonica Valley Antique Days are held in September, and the Holiday Open Houses are in November. There is an annual Holiday Parade the first Saturday in December.

== Notable people ==
- William Armstrong, Wisconsin legislator, lived in Darlington.
- John J. Boyle, U.S. Attorney, lived in Darlington.
- Homer Dwight Chapman, educator, was born in Darlington.
- Charlie Dougherty, MLB player, was born in Darlington.
- Alex Erickson, football player, grew up in Darlington.
- Mark Helpsmeet, activist, was born in Darlington.
- Henry S. Magoon, U.S. Representative, kept a summer home and died in Darlington.
- U.S. Army General Francis Marshall lived in Darlington.
- Harry C. Martin, state senator, was born near Darlington and served as mayor.
- John Morrow (D-New Mexico), U.S. Representative, was born near Darlington.
- Sylvan Muldoon, author of works on astral projection
- Philo A. Orton, Wisconsin legislator and jurist, lived in Darlington.
- Charles F. Osborn, Wisconsin legislator and jurist, lived in and was mayor and city attorney of Darlington.
- Sylvester W. Osborn, Wisconsin legislator, lived in and was postmaster of Darlington.
- David Stuart Rose, mayor of Darlington and later mayor of Milwaukee, was born in Darlington.
- John Sheldon, Wisconsin legislator, lived in Darlington.
- Penelope Trunk, author and journalist
