= Stordahl =

Stordahl is a surname. Notable people with the surname include:

- Axel Stordahl (1913–1963), American arranger
- Erling Stordahl (1923–1994), Norwegian farmer and singer
- Jostein Stordahl (born 1966), Norwegian disabled sportsperson
- Larry Stordahl (born 1942), American ice hockey player
- Ronald Stordahl, American businessman

== See also ==
- Olaf Stordahl Barn
