= Agriculture in Wisconsin =

Cultivation of plants and animals in Wisconsin

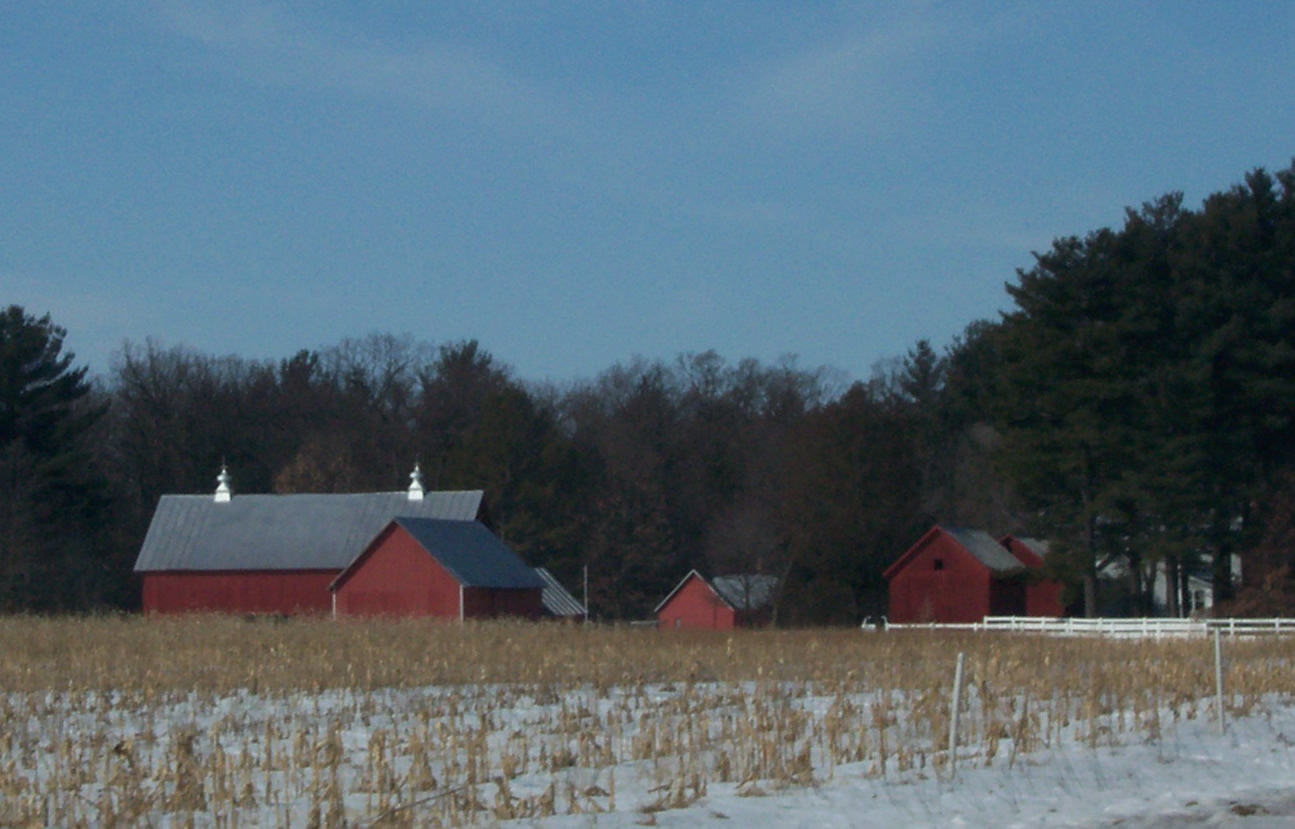
A farm in Marquette County

Agriculture is a significant sector in the economy of the U.S. state of Wisconsin. The state is largely rural and, during the growing season, has a warm humid climate, although temperatures fall below freezing during winter. Wisconsin has both arable crops and livestock, with many farmers growing corn and alfalfa to feed to dairy cattle. The state leads the nation in many crops, including corn for silage, cranberries, and ginseng, and was the leading producer of dairy from 1915 until 1993. The state is still well known for its dairy production as dairy is featured in a number of state symbols including its nickname "America's Dairyland".

Farms in Wisconsin tend to be smaller and family owned. Agriculture is distributed across the state, with the exception of the far north, which is still forested and logging is prevalent.

== Overview ==
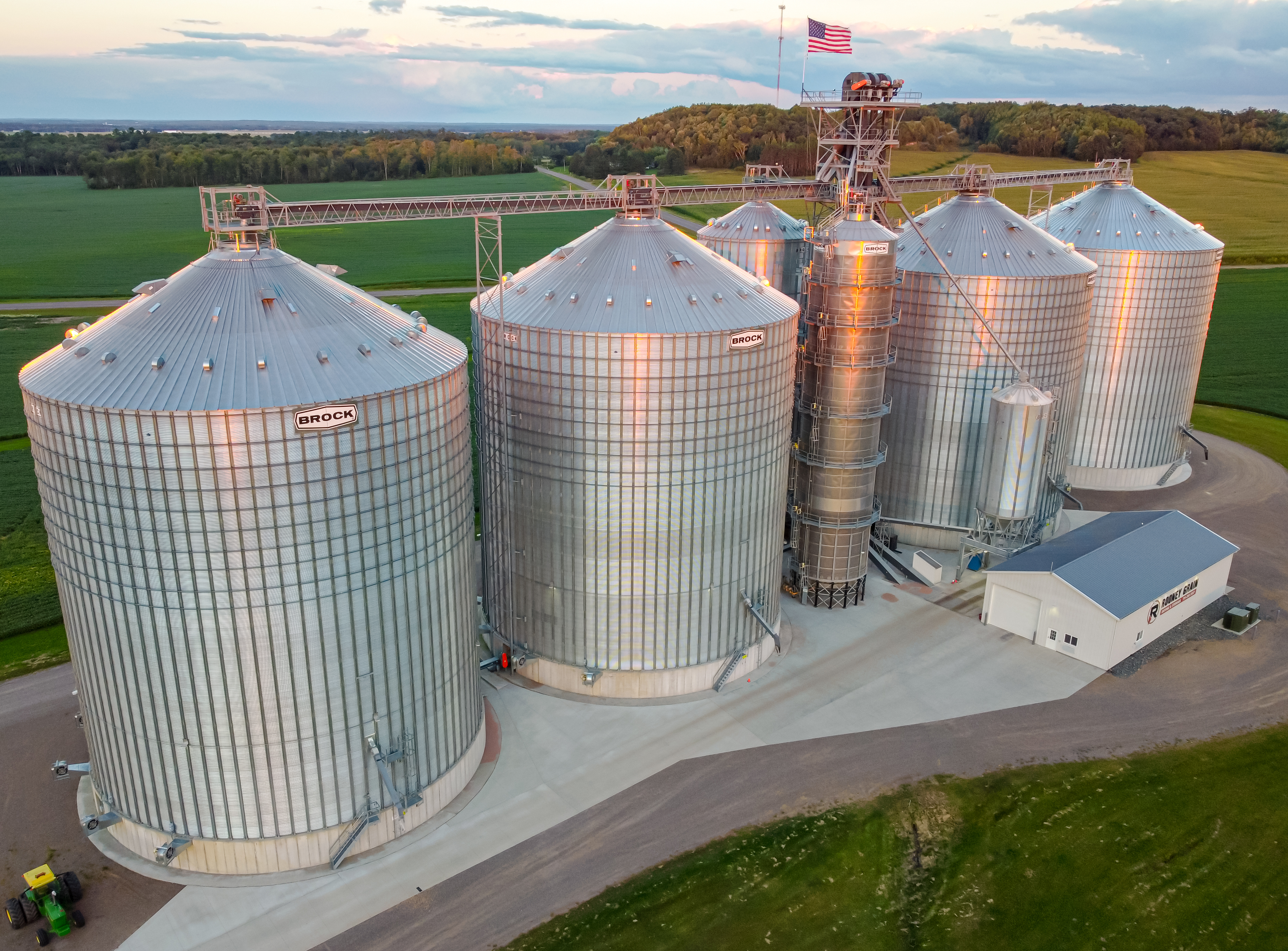
Grain bins in Chippewa Falls

The climate and topography of Wisconsin is favorable to both arable crops and livestock grazing. Wisconsin's soil was ground up over thousand of years during the Wisconsin glaciation, creating soil that is good for crops. The state has a short growing season, but lacks much of the natural disasters that threaten crops. Wisconsin's winters allow cool weather crops to be grown, including potatoes and cranberries. Corn and soybeans, warm weather crops, can still grow well during the summers. The rain in the north and west ranges from 30 inches (760 mm) to 34 inches (860 mm), and drops to 28 inches (710 mm) in the area around Lake Superior.

The sector produces $116 billion in revenue annually. In 2025 there were 58,521 farms in the state, operating across 13.8 million acres (56,000 km^{2}) of land. 96% of farms in Wisconsin are considered family farms. 353,900 jobs, or about 10% of all in Wisconsin are involved with the agricultural sector. Farms are spread out across the state, with a majority being in the south-east, and very few being in the far north of the state.

== Leading products ==
Wisconsin produces a wide variety of crops, including leading the United States in the production of corn for silage, cranberries, ginseng, and snap beans for processing. The state grows more than half the national crop of cranberries, and 97% of the nation's ginseng. Wisconsin is also a leading producer of oats, potatoes, carrots, tart cherries, maple syrup, and sweet corn for processing.

=== Dairy ===
Dairying in Wisconsin includes the harvesting and processing of animal milk, usually from cows, and the processing into cheese, butter, or other dairy products. By 1915, Wisconsin had become the leading state for dairy production, only being surpassed by California in 1993. As of 2018, Wisconsin ranks second in the United States in dairy production, with over 7000 dairy farms that produce 2.44 billion pounds (1.11×10^{9} kg) of milk per month.

Wisconsin has been making cheese since the start of its dairy industry. In 1921, Wisconsin became the first state to grade cheese by its quality. As of 2020, Wisconsin produces 26% of all cheese in the US, totaling 3.39 billion pounds (1.54×10^{9} kg) of cheese in the last year. Wisconsin requires cheese production to be performed or supervised by a licensed cheesemaker, being the only state in the US to require certification. The state also requires cheese sold to be graded for its quality, ranging from grade A to grade D. Producers must also label the age, moisture, and milkfat content.

Butter is another common dairy product produced in Wisconsin. As of 2008, Wisconsin produces 22% of butter in the US, totaling 361 million pounds (164×10^{6} kg) of butter. Wisconsin requires buttermakers to hold a license to produce butter, also being the only state in the US to require certification.

=== Cranberries ===
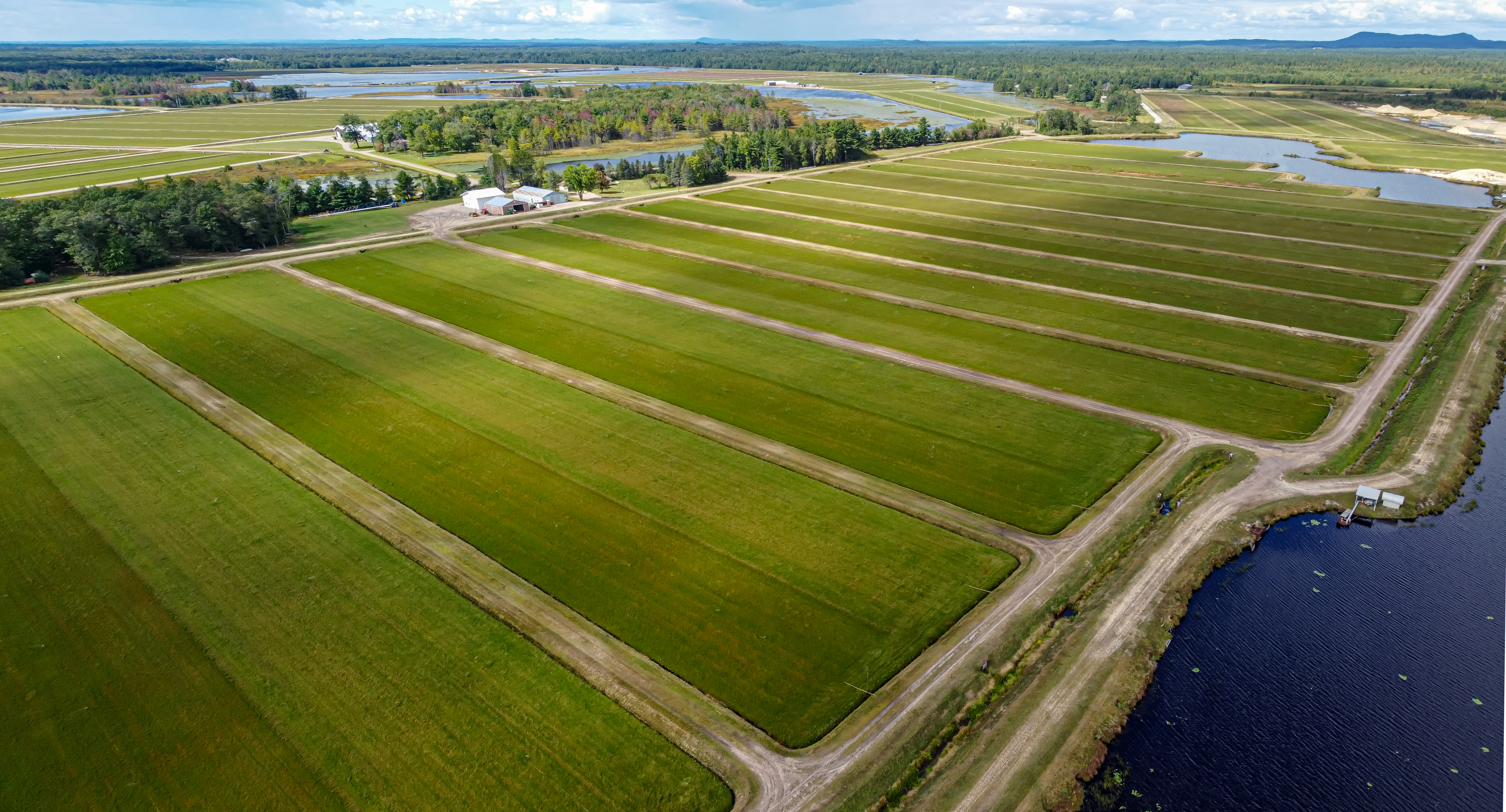
Cranberry farm in central Wisconsin

In the northern region of the state, farmers in the late 19th century began growing cranberries. The crop is well suited to Wisconsin—not needing hot temperatures, growing in marshlands, and resistant to the extreme cold. Cranberries need little care, and are easy to grow.

Today Wisconsin produces 60% of America's cranberries. In 2016, the state grew 6.13 million barrels of cranberries from over 20,000 acres of cranberry fields.

== History ==
=== Indigenous farming ===
The indigenous people of Wisconsin farmed a variety of vegetables and maize. The Oneota were the first people to farm intensively, around the Mississippi River. In the year 1000, the Oneota, much like other Native Americans, were farming the Three Sisters—maize, beans, and squash. Aztalan State Park is the location of one of the farming towns built at this time. The Aztalan population reached several thousand; it was abandoned after 1300 AD.

=== Wheat farming era and its downfall ===
Wisconsin was a frontier to many people in the Northeastern states—offering lots of fresh land for cheap. In the mid-19th century, Wisconsin's population increased from 11,683 in 1836, to 305,391 in 1850; the great majority were farmers. During the early statehood years, farms in Wisconsin mainly produced wheat; it was milled into flour and shipped to eastern states. At their peak in 1860, Wisconsin farms produced 27 million US bushels (950,000 m^{3}) of wheat. However, this production would not last for long due to the worsening of the soil and chinch bugs in the coming years.

During the Civil War years, Wisconsin sent upwards of 11% of its male population to fight. This, however, did not drastically affect the agriculture industry as concurrently advances in machinery would reduce the labor of each individual farmer. Various harvesters, reapers, and mowers were showcased at the 1864 state fair, and advancements would continue to be shown in future years. The J.I. Case Company in Racine was making $1 million (equivalent to $24,187,500 in 2025) annually in 1868. Farmers in Sauk County, among other counties, turned to Hops production, producing 63% of the state's 829,377-pound (376,199 kg) crop in 1865. The "hop craze" would last until 1868, when the market price dropped low again. Other crops experimented with during this time include flax, sorghum, and sugar beets, but these three would only be cultivated for a short period before being priced out by farmers elsewhere in the nation.

During the later years of wheat farming through 1880, Wisconsin would move away from wheat as its sole crop towards a greater diversity in crops grown. Corn and oat production had increased over 12 fold from 1849 to 1879, in which Wisconsin produced 67,140,900 US bushels (2,365,980 m^{3}). In Dane County, tobacco was replacing wheat to the amount of 5,371,242 pounds (2,436,354 kg) in 1879. Early farmers looked to turn to raising sheep as an alternative to wheat. Sheep would prove to be useful to many farmers of this time before they switched to dairying. Many of the southern counties abandoned wheat altogether. These counties turned to tobacco, corn, oats, and dairy cattle. Dairying would prove to be the best alternative to the wheat industry and became ubiquitous by the 1890s.

=== Rise of dairy farming ===
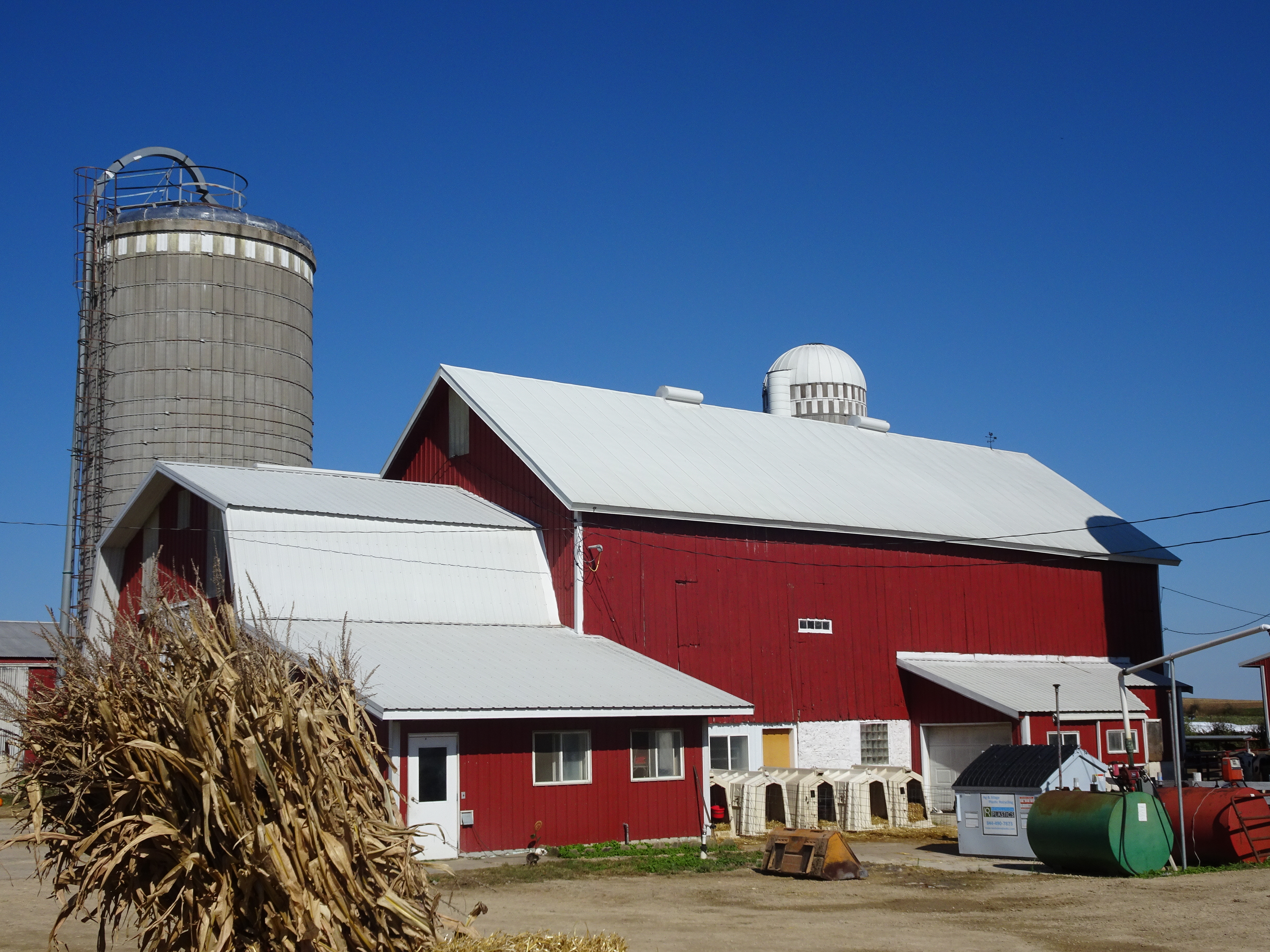
Modern dairy farm in Wisconsin

Many farmers in Wisconsin switched to dairying through 1880 until the end of the century. Dairying was made possible as an industry due to the industrialization of the entire industry, from milk collection, storage, distribution, and processing. William Dempster Hoard, a New York dairyman, wrote for local papers in support of the dairy industry. His own newspaper would get its start in 1870, and the Hoard's Dairyman would be issued 15 years later.

The first cheese factories were established in the 1840s near Fort Atkinson and Lake Mills. Most farmers that kept dairy cattle still continued to make dairy products at home during this time, however. Many early settlers from New York brought their knowledge of the dairy industry to Wisconsin, alongside immigrants from Germany, Switzerland, and Scandinavian countries after 1850.

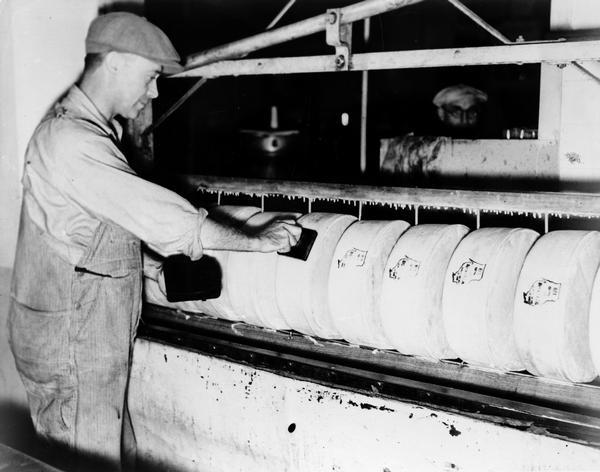
A worker in a New Glarus cheese factory in 1922 places a Wisconsin stamp on wheels of cheese.

The number of dairy cows in Wisconsin increased rapidly, from 245,000 in 1867 to over 2 million by 1925. Wisconsin became the leading dairy state, producing nearly half the nation's cheese and a tenth of its butter by 1907. The University of Wisconsin played a key role in supporting the dairy industry through scientific research, such as Professor Stephen Babcock's development of the butterfat test, and by providing education to farmers on dairy farming methods. Industry groups like the Wisconsin Dairyman's Association were formed in the 1870s to promote cheese production, share new dairying techniques, and overcome opposition to the cheese industry. Influence of immigrant farmers: German and Scandinavian immigrant families helped to grow the Wisconsin's dairy industry by their adapting to dairying and creating European-style cheeses. While dairy farming was initially dominated by family-owned farms, the introduction of automated milking systems and "factory-farms" with hundreds of cows led to the decline of smaller operations.

=== In northern Wisconsin ===
In the second half of the 19th century, commercial fruit production began in Door County, Wisconsin.

The white pine forests in 18 northern Wisconsin counties were the center of the American lumber industry in the mid-19th century. Dozens of towns began as sawmill centers, including Marinette, Oconto, Green Bay, Wausau, Stevens Point, Grand Rapids, Merrill, Black River Falls, Eau Claire, Chippewa Falls, La Crosse, and Ashland. However, by the 1890s, intensive operations removed all the good trees, but left behind a mass of lumbering debris and tree stumps. It was called "the cutover district." The land was sold cheap to farmers. They tried to redeem it as farming land. They did well for a while when prices were high, but prices fell in the 1920s and 1930s and they lost money. The New Deal (1933-1940) sustained many cutover farmers during the Depression, but by the 1950s most farmers gave up and moved out.

== Environmental impacts ==
=== Effects of climate change ===
The multibillion-dollar dairy business in Wisconsin, which provides more than half of the state's agriculture revenue, may suffer as a result of the changing environment. Cows consume less and make less milk when the temperature rises. Crops may face obstacles as a result of climate change, but it may also help them in certain ways; the overall effect is unknown. Longer frost-free growing seasons and increased CO_{2} concentrations in the atmosphere would boost soybean and wheat harvests in an average year. Summers that are becoming increasingly hot are expected to lower maize yields. Much of Wisconsin will likely experience 5 to 10 more days per year with temperatures exceeding 95 °F in 70 years than it does now. Crop output would also be harmed by more severe droughts or floods.

Much like Wisconsin's tourism industry, agriculture also relies on predictable seasonal changes. Because of climate change, Wisconsin's seasonal cycles are becoming more and more unpredictable. The livelihoods of Wisconsin farmers are affected by the unpredictable weather changes every day. In addition to the livelihoods of farmers being affected by climate change in Wisconsin, the increased temperatures and precipitation threaten food security. Although a longer growing season sounds beneficial to food security, in reality, the warmer temperatures and increased precipitation are stressful to crops and animals.

Planting and harvesting crops will prove to be much more challenging due to the increase in precipitation. Soil erosion will increase and lead to larger amounts of polluted runoff. Polluted runoff could then in turn affect the water quality much like flooding and harm living beings.

The warmer temperatures and increases rainfall in the summer months are not the only factor contributing to climate change's effect on agriculture. The winter months in Wisconsin are also becoming warmer. The rise in temperature throughout those winter months allows microorganisms in the soil more time to break down the nutrient-rich organic matter that is found in the soil.

== Cultural significance ==
Agriculture is a significant part of Wisconsin's culture. The prominence of the dairy industry has led to Wisconsin being known as "America's Dairyland", which was made the official state slogan in 1940. After it was designated as Wisconsin's official slogan, "America's Dairyland" was printed on the state's license plates, at first replacing the "Wisconsin" text, but later both were included. In 1986 a graphic representing a dairy farm was added to the plate. The dairy industry is prominently displayed on Wisconsin's state quarter, which features a round of cheese, head of a Holstein cow, and an ear of corn.

== See also ==
- 1933 Wisconsin milk strike
- Minnesota-Wisconsin price
- Wood industry
- History of the lumber industry in the United States
