= Alex Erickson =

American football player (born 1992)

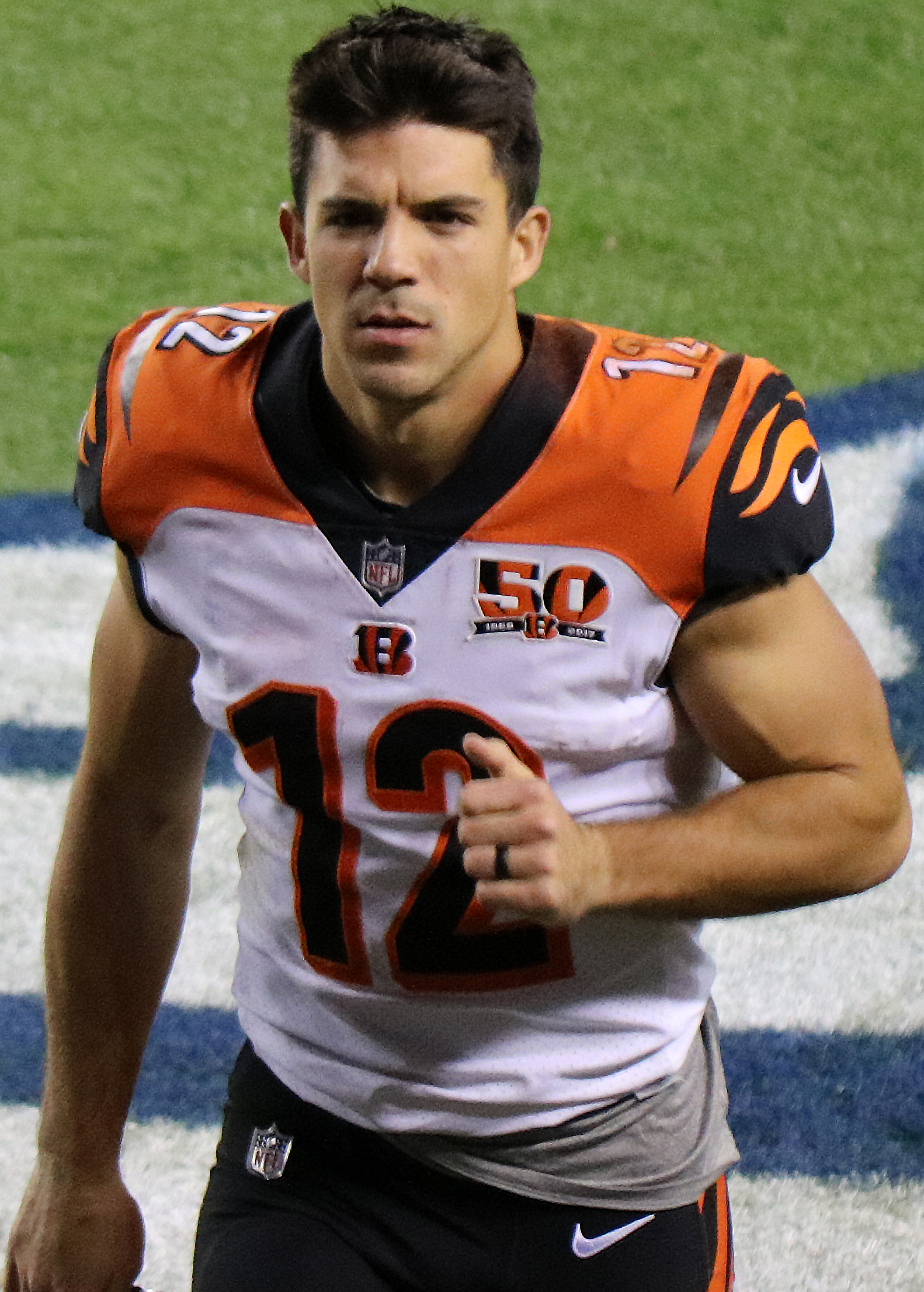
- Erickson with the Cincinnati Bengals in 2017

Profile
- Positions: Wide receiver, return specialist

Personal information
- Born: November 6, 1992 (age 34); Darlington, Wisconsin, U.S.
- Listed height: 6 ft 0 in (1.83 m)
- Listed weight: 195 lb (88 kg)

Career information
- High school: Darlington High School
- College: Wisconsin (2012–2015)
- NFL draft: 2016: undrafted

Career history
- Cincinnati Bengals (2016–2020); Houston Texans (2021)*; Carolina Panthers (2021); Washington Commanders (2022–2023); New York Jets (2023)*; Los Angeles Chargers (2023); New England Patriots (2024); Houston Texans (2024)*
- * Offseason or practice squad member only

Awards and highlights
- NFL kickoff return yards leader (2016); First-team All-Big Ten (2015)

Career NFL statistics
- Receptions: 112
- Receiving yards: 1,373
- Rushing yards: 78
- Return yards: 4,179
- Total touchdowns: 2
- Stats at Pro Football Reference

Alex Michael Erickson (born November 6, 1992) is an American professional football wide receiver and return specialist. He played college football for the Wisconsin Badgers and was signed by the Cincinnati Bengals as an undrafted free agent in 2016. Erickson has also been a member of the Houston Texans, Carolina Panthers, Washington Commanders, New York Jets, Los Angeles Chargers and New England Patriots.

== Early life ==
At Darlington High School in Darlington, Wisconsin, Erickson rushed for 3,856 yards and 57 touchdowns, passed for 3,648 yards and 37 touchdowns and recorded 170 tackles and 14 interceptions. He was chosen to play in the WFCA All-Star game as a senior and was named the Wisconsin State Journal Small School Player of the Year. He was first-team all-state as defensive back and first-team all-conference as defensive back and quarterback after gaining 2,489 yards of total offense (1,239 rushing and 1,250 passing), scoring 33 touchdowns (20 rushing and 13 passing) and making 50 tackles with three interceptions.

== College career ==
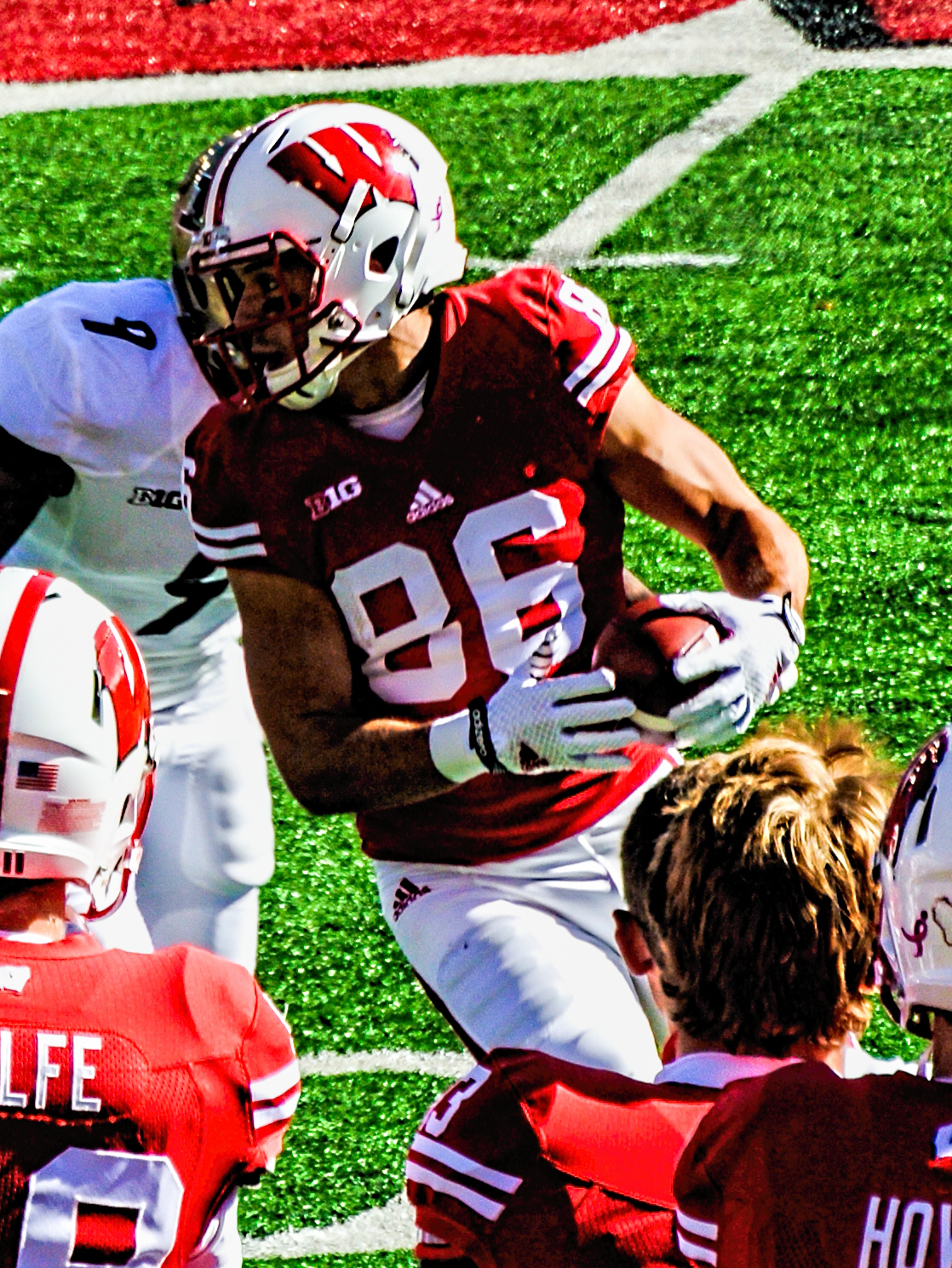
Erickson with Wisconsin in 2015

Erickson lettered three years at Wisconsin, finishing his career ranked 10th in school history with 1,877 receiving yards and ranked sixth all-time with 141 career receptions. In the 2013 season, he had nine receptions for 127 receiving yards in seven games. The next season, his role in the offense expanded with 55 receptions for 772 receiving yards and three receiving touchdowns in 13 games. For his senior season, he caught 77 passes (second in school history) for 978 receiving yards and three receiving touchdowns and he was named first-team All-Big Ten Conference (media), second-team All-Big Ten (coaches), and Academic All-Big Ten (for the third consecutive year).

== Professional career ==
Pre-draft measurables
Height	Weight	Arm length	Hand span	40-yard dash	10-yard split	20-yard split	20-yard shuttle	Three-cone drill	Vertical jump	Broad jump	Bench press
5 ft 11 7/8 in (1.83 m)	195 lb (88 kg)	30 1/4 in (0.77 m)	9 1/4 in (0.23 m)	4.54 s	1.57 s	2.60 s	4.10 s	6.68 s	34.5 in (0.88 m)	9 ft 8 in (2.95 m)	14 reps

=== Cincinnati Bengals ===
Erickson signed with the Cincinnati Bengals as an undrafted free agent in 2016. He was the only undrafted free agent to make the Bengals' final roster.

He started the season as the team's primary kick returner and punt returner, a spot he continued throughout the season, and as a backup receiver. For the season, he had 6 catches for 71 yards, and averaged 27.9 yards per kickoff return and 7.0 yards per punt return. His 810 kickoff return yards led the NFL in that category.

On November 19, 2017, Erickson recorded his first NFL touchdown, scoring on a 29-yard pass from Andy Dalton during the Bengals 20–17 victory over the Denver Broncos. Overall, he finished the 2017 season with 12 receptions for 180 receiving yards and a receiving touchdown to go along with 32 kick returns for 663 net yards and 39 punt returns for 278 net yards.

On September 8, 2018, Erickson signed a two-year contract extension with the Bengals through the 2020 season. He finished the 2018 season with 20 receptions for 187 yards.

Erickson posted his first career 100+ receiving yard game on October 20, 2019, against the Jacksonville Jaguars, where he finished with 137 receiving yards as the Bengals lost 17–27. Overall, Erickson finished the 2019 season with 43 receptions for 529 receiving yards.

=== Houston Texans ===
Erickson signed with the Houston Texans on March 30, 2021. He was released on August 31, 2021.

=== Carolina Panthers ===
Erickson signed with the practice squad of the Carolina Panthers on September 6, 2021, signing to their active roster a week later.

=== Washington Commanders ===
Erickson signed with the Washington Commanders on May 4, 2022. He was waived on August 30, 2022, and signed to the practice squad the next day. He signed a reserve/future contract on January 9, 2023, and was released on May 12, 2023.

=== New York Jets ===
On July 20, 2023, Erickson signed with the New York Jets. He was released on August 29, 2023.

=== Los Angeles Chargers ===
On August 31, 2023, Erickson was signed to the Los Angeles Chargers practice squad. He was signed to the active roster on December 2.

=== New England Patriots ===
On December 18, 2024, the New England Patriots signed Erickson to their practice squad.

=== Houston Texans (second stint) ===
On January 15, 2025, Erickson signed with the Houston Texans practice squad.

== Career statistics ==
=== NFL ===
Legend
	Led the league
**Bold**	Career high

Year	Team	Games		Receiving					Rushing					Punt returns					Kick returns				
Year	Team	GP	GS	Rec	Yds	Avg	Lng	TD	Att	Yds	Avg	Lng	TD	Ret	Yds	Avg	Lng	TD	Ret	Yds	Avg	Lng	TD
2016	CIN	16	0	6	71	11.8	20	0	—	—	—	—	—	28	195	7.0	24	0	29	810	27.9	**84**	0
2017	CIN	16	0	12	180	15.0	37	**1**	**5**	16	3.2	14	0	**39**	**278**	7.1	29	0	32	663	20.7	41	0
2018	CIN	16	**6**	20	167	8.4	28	0	3	22	**7.3**	14	0	20	212	**10.6**	**38**	0	**40**	**1,049**	26.2	77	0
2019	CIN	16	**6**	**43**	**529**	12.3	**52**	0	**5**	**33**	6.6	**17**	0	25	157	6.3	17	0	4	79	19.8	26	0
2020	CIN	16	2	12	139	11.6	42	0	**5**	7	1.4	7	0	23	232	10.1	29	0	3	71	23.7	24	0
2021	CAR	**17**	0	3	55	**18.3**	25	0	—	—	—	—	—	23	204	8.9	22	0	2	57	**28.5**	39	0
2022	WAS	2	0	—	—	—	—	—	—	—	—	—	—	4	25	6.3	13	0	—	—	—	—	—
2023	LAC	8	3	16	232	14.5	27	**1**	—	—	—	—	—	—	—	—	—	—	—	—	—	—	—
2024	NE	3	0	—	—	—	—	—	—	—	—	—	—	4	41	10.3	26	0	4	106	26.5	34	0
Career		110	17	112	1,373	12.3	52	2	18	78	4.3	17	0	166	1,344	8.1	38	0	114	2,835	24.9	84	0

=== College ===
Year	Team	Games		Receiving				Rushing			
Year	Team	GP	GS	Rec	Yds	Avg	TD	Att	Yds	Avg	TD
2012	Wisconsin	Redshirted (redshirt)									
2013	Wisconsin	13	3	9	127	**14.1**	0	1	12	12.0	0
2014	Wisconsin	**14**	**13**	55	772	14.0	**3**	3	1	0.3	0
2015	Wisconsin	13	12	**77**	**978**	12.7	**3**	**7**	**111**	**15.9**	0
Career		40	28	141	1,877	13.3	6	11	124	11.3	0

== Personal life ==
He married in 2017. Erickson graduated from Wisconsin in December 2015 with a bachelor's degree in agricultural business management.
