= Wisconsin dairy barn =

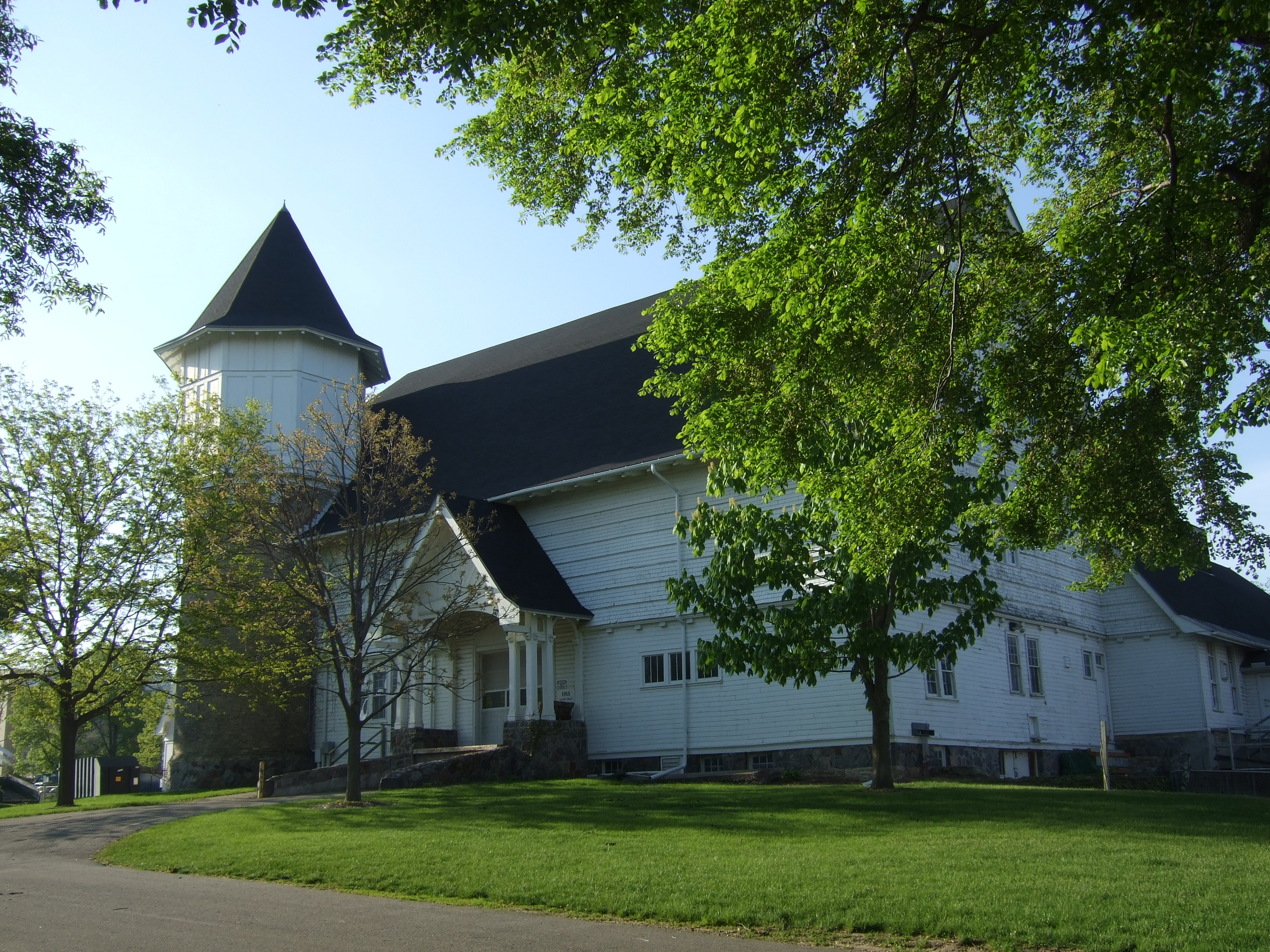
The University of Wisconsin Dairy Barn

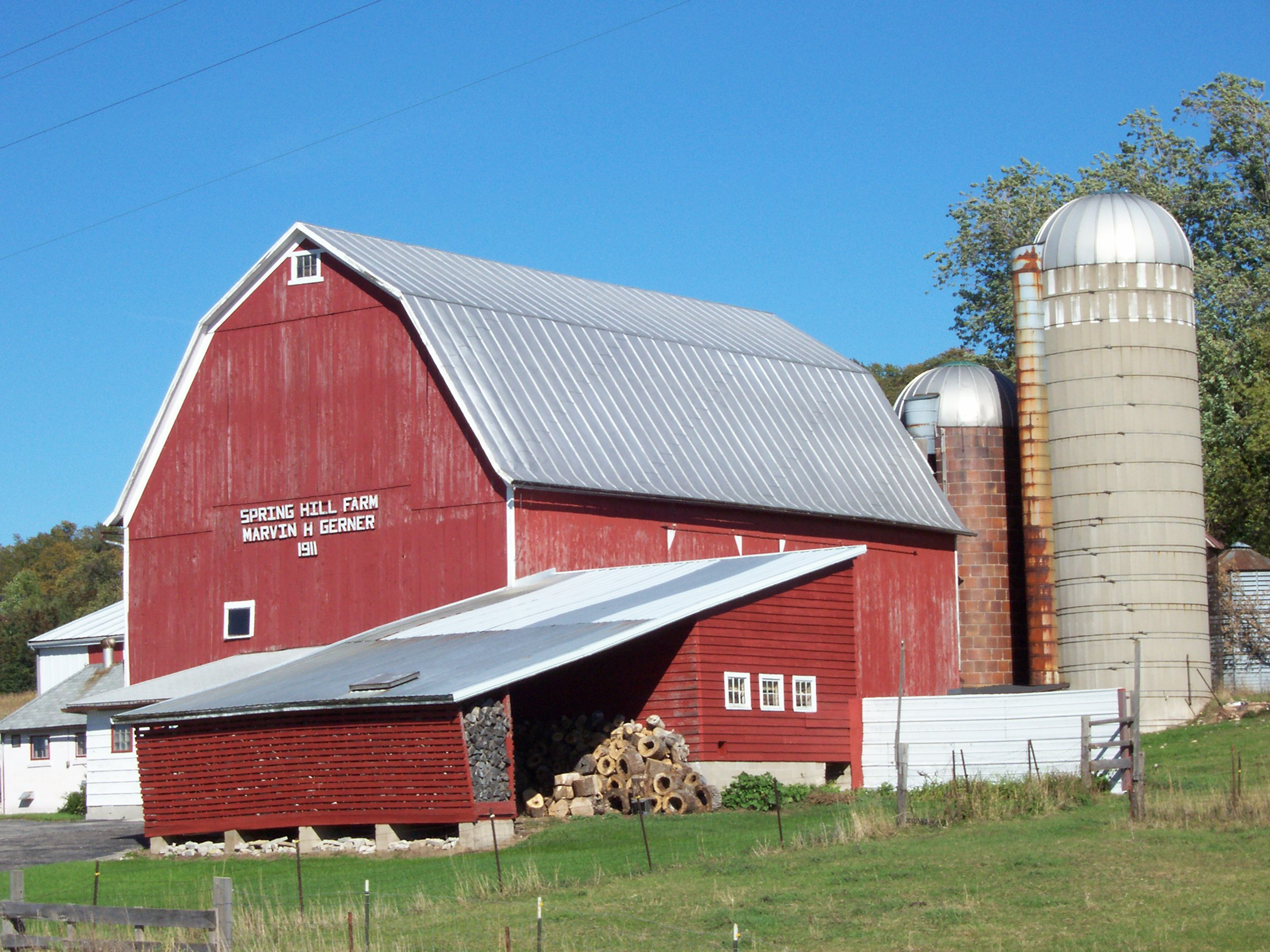
Typical Wisconsin barn

A Wisconsin dairy barn is a style of barn developed presumably in the U.S. state of Wisconsin, but present in other U.S. states, especially further west.

"The introduction of the Wisconsin Dairy Barn, which was actively promoted by the University of Wisconsin School of Agriculture, incorporated the scientific knowledge of the turn-of-the-[20th-]century. Ample light and ventilation, a gambrel roof to increase storage space for hay, built-in manure and hay tracks, and poured concrete floors for sanitation, all reflected the technological requirements necessary to run a modern dairy operation."

Wisconsin dairy barns became popular in Ohio.

Notable examples include:

- University of Wisconsin Dairy Barn (1897), 1915 Linden Dr., Madison, Wisconsin
- Olaf Stordahl Barn (1918), Kingsbury County, South Dakota
- Hoffman Barn (1920), Deuel County, South Dakota

== See also ==
- Wisconsin dairy industry
- Gothic arch barn, with even bigger open space for hay
- New England barn
- Pennsylvania barn
- Bank barn
