= Charles F. Osborn =

American politician

Charles Francis Osborn (1847–1923) was a member of the Wisconsin State Assembly.

== Biography ==
Osborn was born on March 16, 1847, in Ashtabula, Ohio. In 1851, he moved to Darlington, Wisconsin.

His father, Sylvester W. Osborn, and brother-in-law, Philo A. Orton, were also members of the Assembly.

== Career ==
Osborn was a member of the Assembly during the 1889 and 1891 sessions. In 1880, he had been elected Mayor of Darlington. Additionally, Osborn was city attorney of Darlington and county judge of Lafayette County, Wisconsin. He was a Republican.

Osborn died in the summer of 1923 in San Pedro, California, where he had gone a few months prior for his health. His funeral was held in Darlington.
