= Philo A. Orton =

American lawyer and politician

The Honorable Philo A. Orton
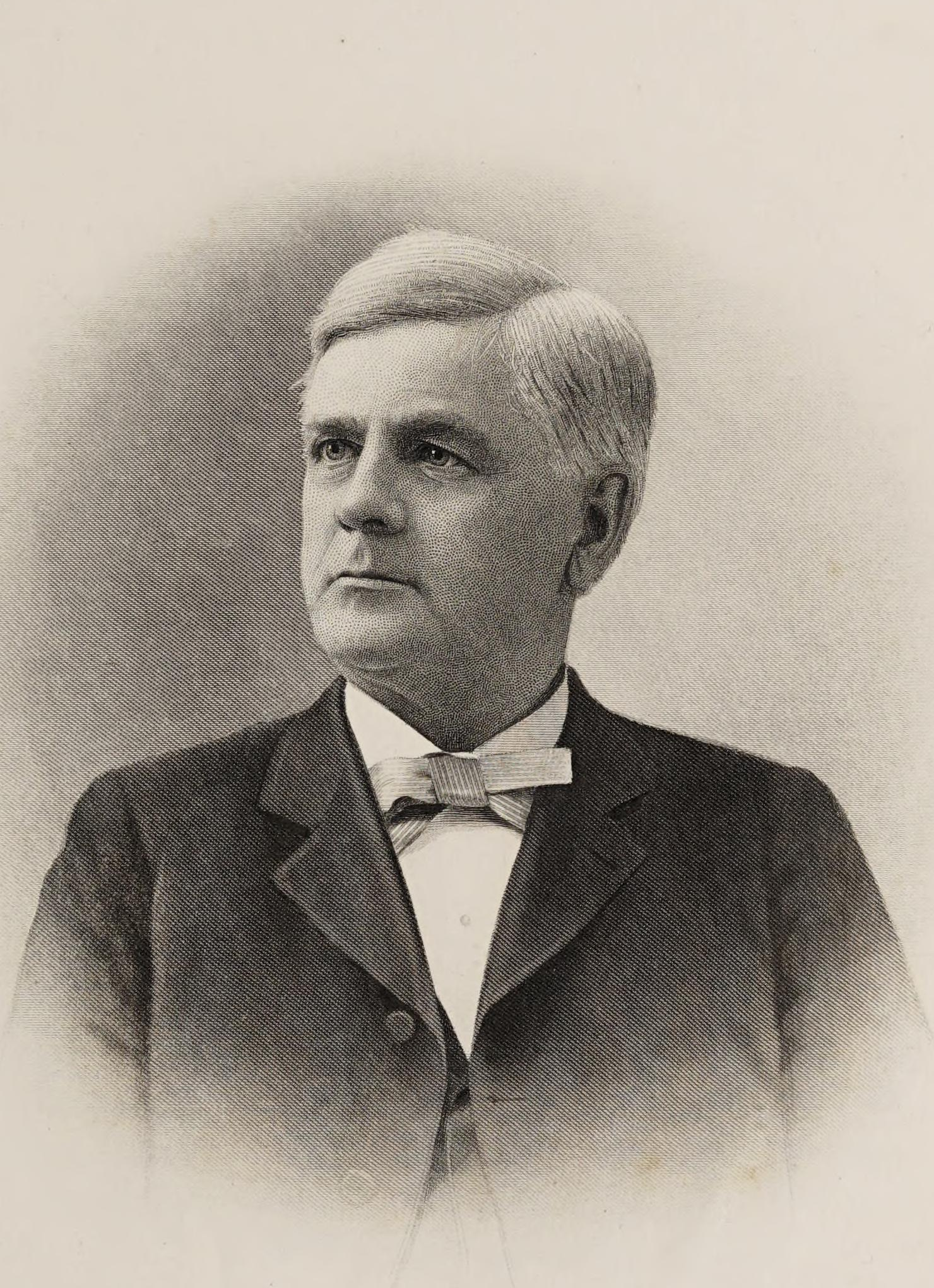

Member of the Wisconsin State Assembly from the Lafayette County district
- In office January 1, 1899 – January 1, 1903
- Preceded by: George Sheffer
- Succeeded by: Richard E. Tarrell

County Judge of La Fayette County
- In office January 1, 1870 – January 1, 1874
- Preceded by: John Wilford Blackstone Jr.
- Succeeded by: Thomas J. Law

District Attorney of La Fayette County
- In office January 1, 1863 – January 1, 1865
- Preceded by: Philemon Simpson
- Succeeded by: A. P. B. Wood

Personal details
- Born: Philo Atwood Orton Jr. March 27, 1837 Hamilton, New York, U.S.
- Died: June 10, 1919 (aged 82) Darlington, Wisconsin, U.S.
- Resting place: Union Grove Cemetery; Darlington, Wisconsin
- Party: Republican; Independent (1870-1874); Democratic (before 1880)
- Spouses: Sara Osborn; (died 1913)
- Children: Susan Orton^{(b. 1871; died 1960)}; Robert Eugene Orton^{(b. 1873; died 1945)}
- Parents: Philo A. Orton Sr. (father); Nancy C. (Collins) Orton (mother)
- Relatives: Sylvester W. Osborn (father-in-law); Charles F. Osborn (brother-in-law); Philo Orton (granduncle)
- Profession: lawyer, banker, judge

Philo Atwood Orton Jr. (March 27, 1837 – June 10, 1919) was an American lawyer, politician, banker, and Wisconsin pioneer. He was a member of the Wisconsin State Assembly, representing Lafayette County during the 1899 and 1901 terms. He also served as district attorney and county judge in Lafayette County.

== Biography ==
Born in Hamilton, Madison County, New York, a son of Philo Atwood Orton and Nancy Collins. His granduncle was Philo Orton, a New York State Assemblyman. He came to Wisconsin with his family in 1850, settling in Beloit. He studied at Beloit College for two years.

Orton and his family moved to Darlington, Wisconsin, in Lafayette County, in 1855. He studied law in the office of James R. Rose and was admitted to the State Bar of Wisconsin in 1859.

Orton married Sara Osborn, the daughter of Sylvester W. Osborn, in 1862. He later took on her younger brother, Charles F. Osborn, as a student in his office. After Osborn was admitted to the bar, they formed a partnership, Orton & Osborne, that endured in Darlington for fifty years.

== Political career ==
He was the Democratic Party nominee for Attorney General of Wisconsin in 1861, but was defeated in the general election. He won office in 1862 as district attorney for La Fayette County. He was elected County Judge in 1870, running as an independent, and served four years. In 1876, he was the Democratic candidate for Congress in Wisconsin's 3rd congressional district, but was unsuccessful. He supported James A. Garfield in the 1880 election, and, since then, he has identified as a Republican. He returned to public office in 1899 as Lafayette County's representative to the Wisconsin State Assembly and served until 1903.

== Education and business career ==
Orton served as president of the board of education in Darlington for twenty years. He was a member of the board of regents of the University of Wisconsin from 1874 to 1877.

In 1874, he obtained a controlling stake in the La Fayette Bank, which he held until organizing the First National Bank of Darlington in 1882. He was president of the Bank of Darlington for the rest of his life. He was also president of the Benton state bank at Benton, Wisconsin.

== Family and personal life ==
Orton is a descendant of Thomas Orton, who arrived in Windsor, Connecticut Colony, in 1640.

He was one of the charter members of the Delta Kappa Epsilon chapter at Colgate University, and was an active Mason in the Darlington lodge.

He married Sara Osborn on January 27, 1862. Her father, Sylvester W. Osborn, and brother, Charles F. Osborn, both served in the Wisconsin State Assembly. Philo and Sara Osborn had one son and one daughter.

Orton died in Darlington on June 10, 1919. He was blind for the last five years of his life.

== Electoral history ==
Wisconsin Attorney General Election, 1861
| Party | Candidate | Votes | % | ±% |
|---|---|---|---|---|
General Election, November 5, 1861
| Republican | James Henry Howe (incumbent) | 55,367 | 55.86% | +2.16% |
| Democratic | Philo A. Orton | 43,647 | 44.04% | −2.26% |
| | Scattering | 97 | 0.10% | |
| Plurality | | 11,720 | 11.83% | +4.41% |
| Total votes | | 99,111 | 100.0% | -12.12% |
| Republican hold | | | | |

Party political offices
| Preceded by Samuel Crawford | Democratic nominee for Attorney General of Wisconsin; 1861 | Succeeded by Eleazer Wakeley |
Legal offices
| Preceded by Philemon Simpson | District Attorney of Lafayette County, Wisconsin; January 1, 1863 – January 1, 1865 | Succeeded by A. P. B. Wood |
| Preceded by John W. Blackstone, Jr. | County Judge of Lafayette County, Wisconsin; January 1, 1870 – January 1, 1874 | Succeeded by Thomas J. Law |
