= Wisconsin dairy industry =

Overview of the milk producing industry in Wisconsin

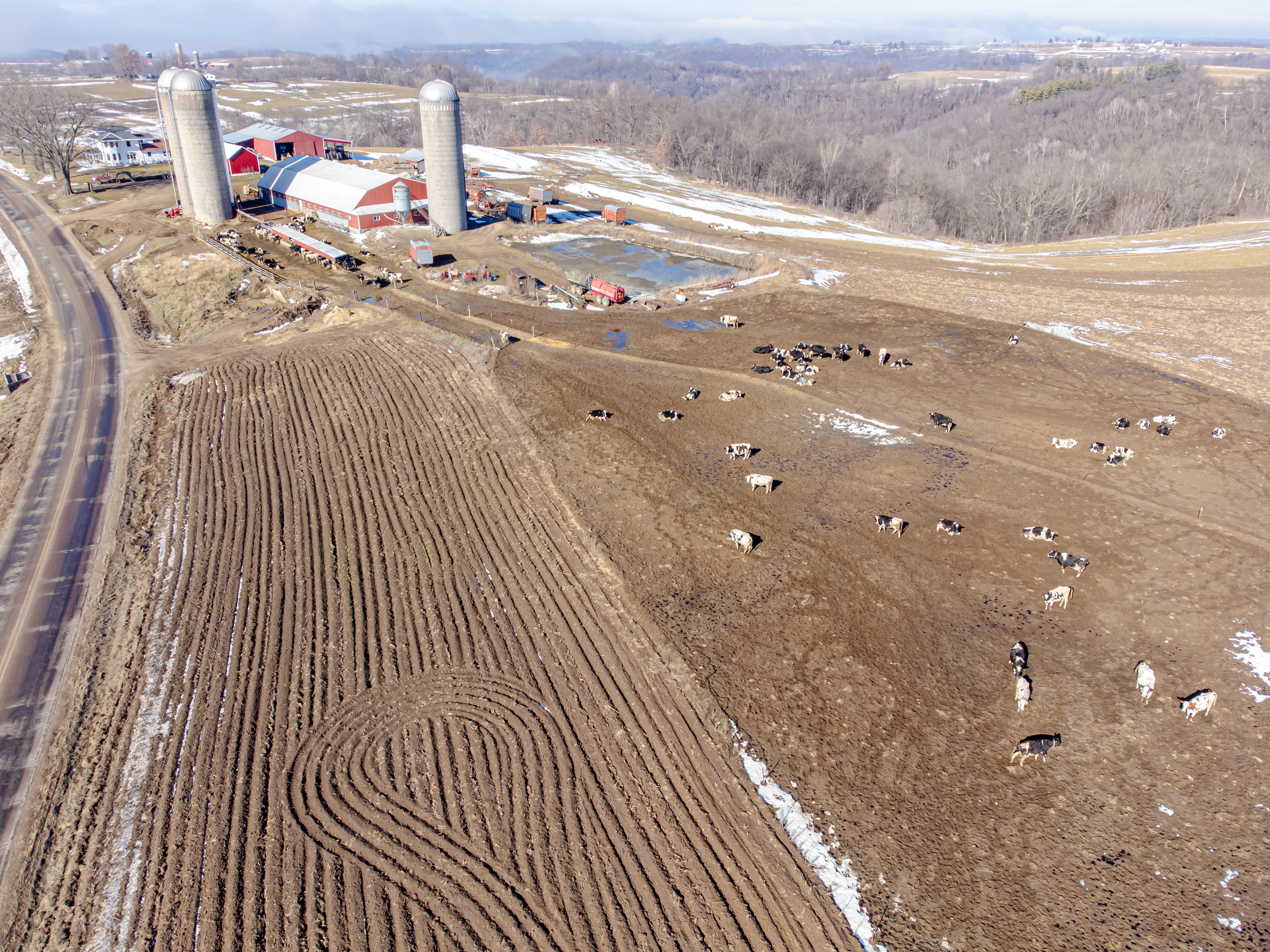
Dairy farm in Western Wisconsin

Dairy is a major industry in the U.S. state of Wisconsin. Being known for its dairy production, the state is often called "America's Dairyland." The industry is prominent in official state symbols—being displayed on the state's license plates, state's slogan, and on the state quarter.

Dairying in Wisconsin includes the harvesting and processing of animal milk, usually from cows, and the processing into cheese, butter, or other dairy products. Dairy became an important industry in the late-19th century, following the invention of the refrigerated rail car. By 1915, Wisconsin had become the leading state for dairy production, only being surpassed by California in 1993. As of 2018, Wisconsin ranks second in the United States in dairy production, with over 7000 dairy farms that produce 2.44 billion pounds (1.11×10^{9} kg) of milk per month.

== Farming ==
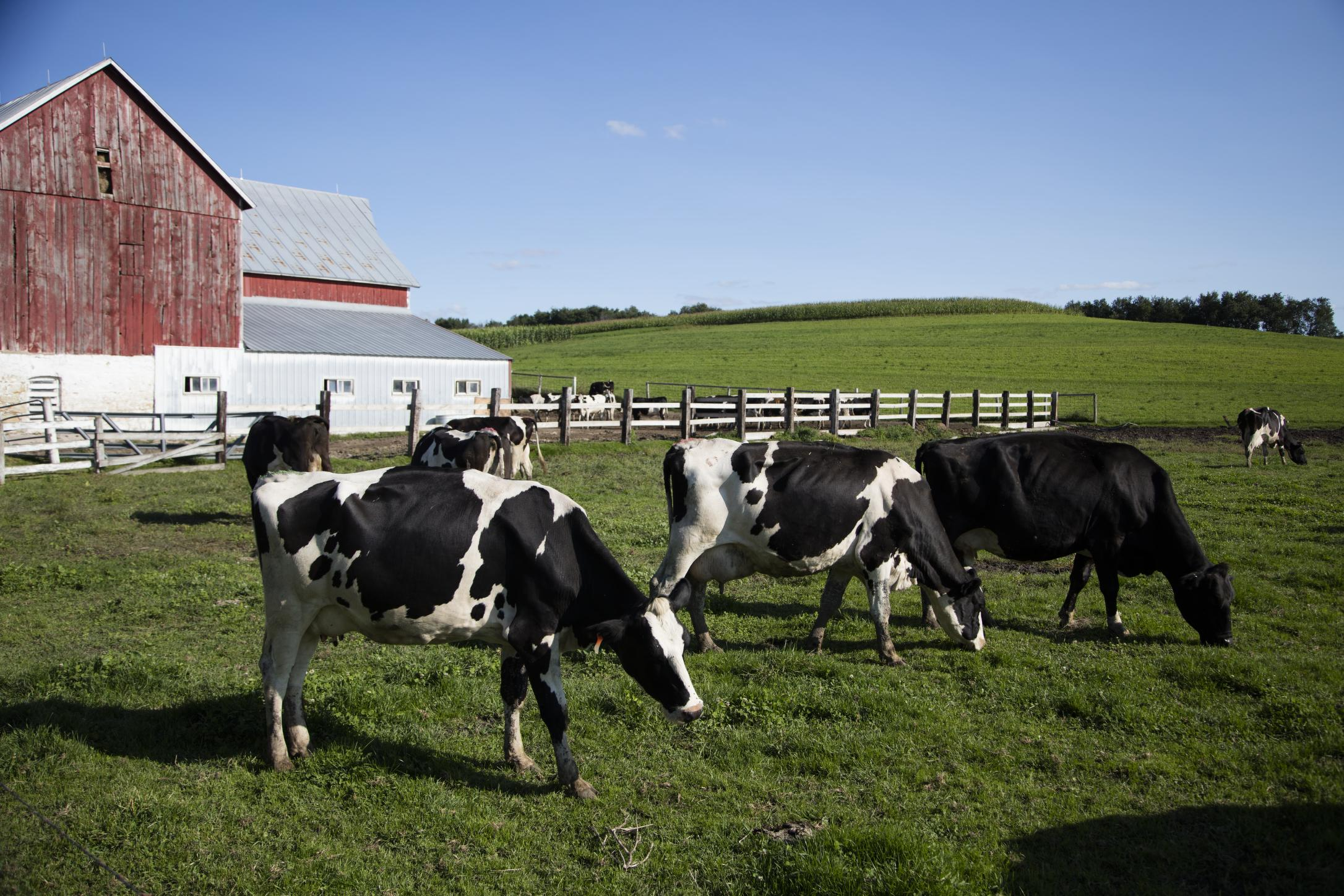
Dairy cows at a Wisconsin family farm

Dairy farming in Wisconsin became commercially viable in the late 19th century. Since its founding, most dairy enterprises were family-owned farms. Wisconsin dairy farms almost entirely hold dairy cows, typically in herds of over 100. The cows are usually kept in a pasture and milked in the barn, two or three times per day. Most dairy farms grow much of their feed to offset the price of buying it wholesale. Milking parlors, milking pipelines, and automated milking, while less common, are found in Wisconsin farms. Many family farms also produce cheese or butter, alongside milk.

Automatic milking systems were developed in the late 20th century and slowly introduced to Wisconsin farms. Since its introduction, Intensive dairy farming, also called factory-farms, has allowed farmers to keep upwards of 750 cows. These large-scale operations have been forcing smaller family farms out of business.

== Products ==
Wisconsin dairies produce a variety of products from processing milk.

=== Cheese ===
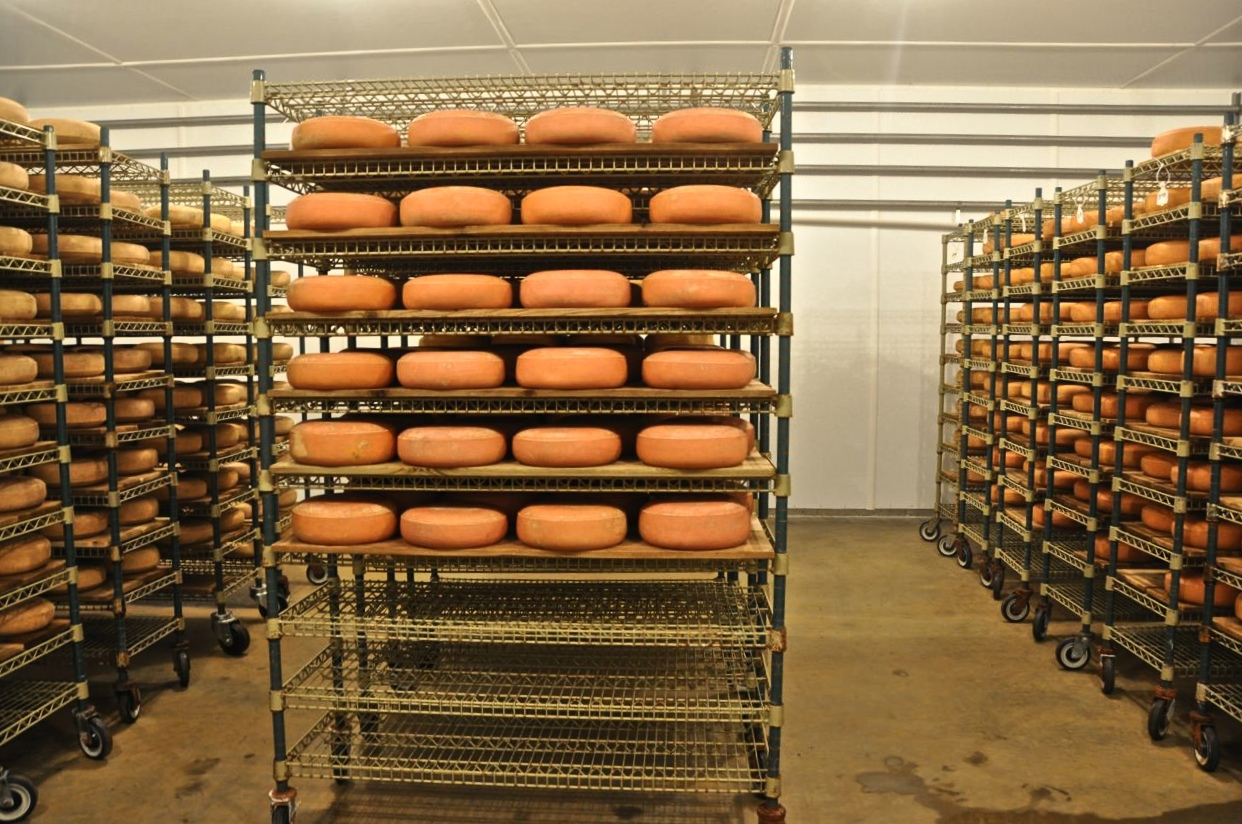
A "cheese cave" used to age cheeses.

Wisconsin has been making cheese since the start of its dairy industry. In the 19th century, much of the milk was made into cheese, because it kept longer than milk or butter. In the latter half of the 19th century, cheese production moved from the farms to specialized factories, resulting in higher quality cheese. In 1921, Wisconsin became the first state to grade cheese by its quality. As of 2020, Wisconsin produces 26% of all cheese in the US, totaling 3.39 billion pounds (1.54×10^{9} kg) of cheese in the last year.

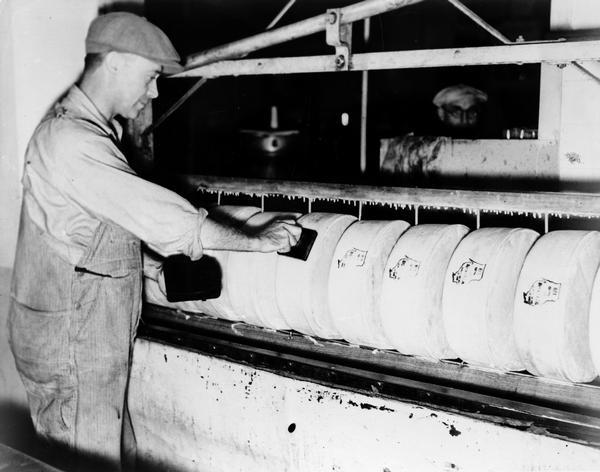
A worker in a New Glarus cheese factory places a Wisconsin stamp on wheels of cheese (1922)

Wisconsin cheesemakers produce hundreds of varieties. Settlers in Wisconsin brought their local cheese varieties with them. Swiss cheese being one of the first, alongside mozzarella and provolone. Some varieties were invented in Wisconsin, including brick and Colby cheese. Varieties of cheese produced in Wisconsin include cheddar, muenster, and feta, in which it leads the US. Within Wisconsin, mozzarella accounts for 31% of all cheese produced, while cheddar accounts for 21%.

Wisconsin requires cheese production to be performed or supervised by a licensed cheesemaker, being the only state in the US to require certification. The state also requires cheese sold to be graded for its quality, ranging from grade A to grade D. Producers must also label the age, moisture, and milkfat content.

=== Butter ===
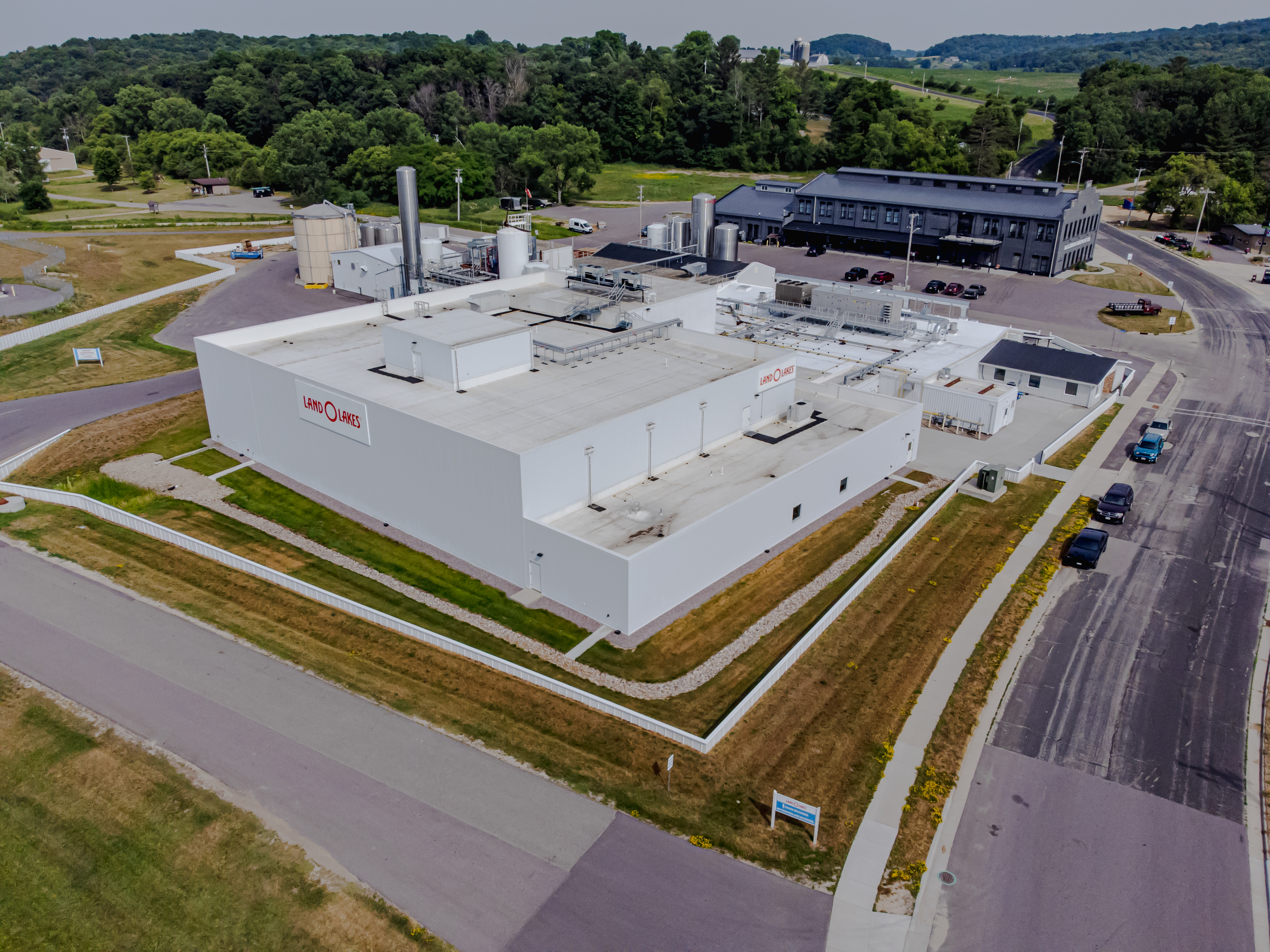
Land O'Lakes plant in Hillsboro, Wisconsin

Butter is another common dairy product produced in Wisconsin. As of 2008, Wisconsin produces 22% of butter in the US, totaling 361 million pounds (164×10^{6} kg) of butter. Wisconsin requires buttermakers to hold a license to produce butter, also being the only state in the US to require certification. By state law, restaurants are not allowed to serve margarine in place of butter unless a customer specifically asks for the former.

== History ==
The Wisconsin dairy industry began in the latter half of the 19th century. The first farms in Wisconsin exclusively produced wheat. At their peak, Wisconsin farms produced 27 million US bushels (950,000 m^{3}) of wheat. Rapidly, in the 1860s, the wheat farms began suffering mass soil depletion and insect infestations, lowering the quality and yield of the crop. During the 1880s, with pressure from the Wisconsin Dairymen’s Association, farms across the state began switching to producing dairy.

The invention and widespread use of the refrigerated rail car allowed many farms to switch to producing dairy products and raising feed crops instead of wheat. They were highly successful, and by the start of the 20th century, over 90% of farms were dairy.

During the late 19th century, cheesemakers in Wisconsin invented new varieties of cheese. These included brick and Colby, which are both derived from cheddar cheese. Brick cheese is created by using a higher temperature during the culturing process, leading to a softer texture. Brick cheese is traditional on Detroit-style pizza. Colby cheese forgoes the cheddaring process, instead partially draining the whey and adding cold water to the curds. This process gives it a mild flavor and a texture that is moister and softer than cheddar. Traditionally, Colby is pressed into a cylindrical from called a longhorn. The cheese was invented by Joseph Steinwand and was named after the township of their cheese factory, Colby, Wisconsin.

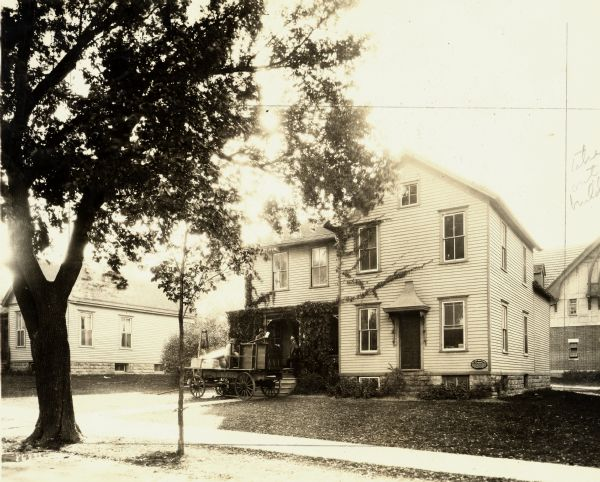
The first dairy school building at the University of Wisconsin

In 1890, Stephen Babcock from the University of Wisconsin–Madison developed a test to determine milkfat content. This innovation led to higher quality milk and dairy products. By 1915, Wisconsin became the leading state for dairy production, a lead it would maintain until 1993.

In 1895, the Wisconsin legislature prohibited the sale of yellow margarine, fearing that it would disrupt the state's dairy industry. So manufacturers switched to producing pink margarine. The margarine ban lasted for 75 years, until it was overturned in 1967. Wisconsin was the last state to repeal its margarine ban, the previous being Minnesota, which overturned theirs in 1963. But it is still illegal for restaurants to serve margarine, unless the customer requests it. While the ban was never enforced, it carried a $6,000 fine.

The state requires all butter and cheese makers to hold a license. These rules were created in 1929, because of the amount of substandard product in Wisconsin.

In 1933, during the Great Depression, there was a series of strikes by Wisconsin dairy farmers attempting to raise the price of milk. The cooperative group of farmers attempted to coordinate their efforts with larger groups, including the Farmers' Holiday Association. However, the larger groups ended their strike early to avoid losses.

When states, such as California, started to experiment with new factory-farms, they saw great success, compared to Wisconsin's family farms. Throughout the late 20th-century, California dairy production started to grow rapidly, replacing Wisconsin as the leading state for milk production in 1993. Many of Wisconsin's family farms have been closing down, due to increased competition from large factory farms. Since 2005, about half of the dairy farms have closed, leaving Wisconsin with 7000 dairy farms in 2020.

Rising tariffs on dairy products have also been a major contributor to the decrease in productivity in Wisconsin. In 2018, China and Mexico imposed large tariffs on the US, making it harder for farms to sell their dairy products. Farmers across Wisconsin lost an estimated $40,000 in yearly revenue due to these tariffs. The number of immigrant dairy workers is rising, from 5% in 2000 to 40% in 2010. This increase is due to many farmers looking to increase the size of their herds, which requires more workers. Another decrease of productivity resulted from the COVID-19 pandemic, especially during 2020. The decrease in demand forced farmers to dump excess milk, since they were unable to sell it. The industry quickly rebounded in late 2020, after Wisconsin loosened its lockdowns.

== Cultural significance ==
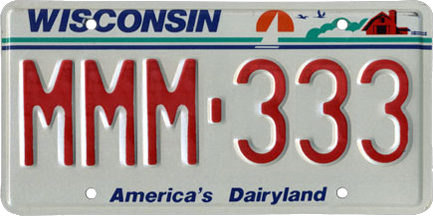
1987 Wisconsin license plate, displaying the farm graphic and the state's slogan.

The prominence of the dairy industry in Wisconsin has led to Wisconsin being known as "America's Dairyland", which was made the official state slogan in 1940. After it was designated as Wisconsin's official slogan, "America's Dairyland" was printed on the state's license plates, at first replacing the "Wisconsin" text, but later both were included. In 1986 a graphic representing a dairy farm was added to the plate.

In 1971, the dairy cow was designated as the official state domesticated animal. Milk was designated as the official state beverage in 1987. Every year since 1967, Madison has held the World Dairy Expo: a five day-event showcasing the dairy industry, ranging from dairy cattle to ice cream. Since 1998, there has been an effort to make Colby the official state cheese, however no action has been taken.

"Cheeseheads" is a nickname for people from Wisconsin or fans of the Green Bay Packers NFL football franchise. Cheese-wedge shaped hats are a common sight at Packers games, especially since 1994. The dairy industry is prominently displayed on Wisconsin's state quarter, which features a round of cheese, head of a Holstein cow, and an ear of corn.

== Environmental impact ==
The large scale production of dairy in Wisconsin has been a notable source of pollution to surface water. Manure lagoons used by the industry frequently spill over or leak into the ground due to their usually insecure linings. Additionally, crops are often oversprayed with manure, leading to runoff into the surrounding water and increased risk of airborne disease spread. Both practices cause nutrients such as Phosphorus and Nitrogen to reach excessive levels in bodies of water, leading to toxic algal blooms, fish kills, and dead zones.

== See also ==
- Agriculture in Wisconsin
- Minnesota-Wisconsin price
- Wisconsin dairy barn
- 1933 Wisconsin milk strike
