= 1933 Wisconsin milk strike =

1933 labor strike by Wisconsin dairy farmers

The 1933 Wisconsin milk strike was a series of strikes conducted by a cooperative group of Wisconsin dairy farmers in an attempt to raise the price of milk paid to producers during the Great Depression. Three main strike periods occurred in 1933, with length of time and level of violence increasing during each one.

The cooperative milk pool attempted to coordinate their efforts with larger farm groups, specifically the National Farm Holiday Association and Wisconsin Farmers' Holiday Association. However, during each strike, the larger farm holiday groups ended their strikes prematurely, leaving the milk pool to conduct its strike alone.

== Rationale ==
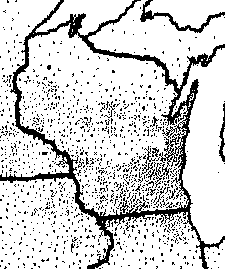
Distribution of milk production in 1929 from 1930 Census.

The price of evaporated milk from 1927 to 1929 was $4.79 per 100 lbs., with 46% going to farmers, 33% to manufacturers and 21% to merchandisers. Between 1930 and 1933 the price fell to an average of $3.48 per 100 lbs., with individual farmers receiving a smaller percentage of the proceeds: 30.5% to farmers, 43% to manufacturers and 26.5% to merchandisers. This decrease put small farmers in an extremely difficult position. Farmers who produced milk for bottling were able to remain solvent, but those who produced milk for cheese, butter, and other uses were driven into poverty. The price of milk that was going to urban areas for bottling was around $1.50 for a hundred pounds while the milk going to cheese and butter factories was only $0.85 for a hundred pounds of milk. This created a kind of civil war between the two types of dairy farmers. Milk to be bottled was largely unaffected by the strikes.

In the 1930s, Wisconsin was the largest producer of milk in the United States. According to the 1930 decennial census, there were more than 125,000 dairy farms in the state. 63% of all land in Wisconsin was farmland and 71% of that land was used for dairy farming.

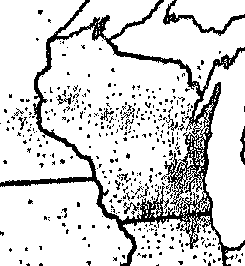
Distribution of milk sold as whole milk in Wisconsin in 1929, from 1930 Census.

Methods employed in the strikes were initially to simply not sell milk unless a previously agreed upon price of $1.50 per hundred pounds had been met. When the strikers realized they were grossly outnumbered and that some of their members were selling at a reduced price, they resorted to roadblocks to prevent milk deliveries to the manufacturers. Fixed road blocks were established and trucks were turned back if they contained milk. If they refused to turn back, the strikers forcibly dumped the milk at the roadside. In the early strikes, the deliveries simply took alternate routes to avoid the fixed roadblocks. During later strikes, the strikers took to the roads in search of delivery trucks and forced them to turn back as they were found. When they couldn't stop the deliveries, the strikers sometimes resorted to tainting the delivered milk with kerosene or oil, or in a few cases, throwing bombs at the creameries.

The state attempted to get milk to market by breaking up the road blocks or escorting convoys carrying milk to their destinations. Tear gas was employed to disburse larger groups of strikers and in one instance guardsmen with fixed bayonets forced farmers from their position. Railways and interurban trains were used to bypass the roadblocks, but some rail lines were blocked by strikers and at least one freight yard was infiltrated resulting in the dumping of the milk in the yard.

At this time there were other farmer organizations in different Mid-Western states that had already been protesting the rise in dairy prices and other farm problems. These farmer leagues had a lot to do with the "Farmers Holiday" organization that emerged in 1932 and 1933 in certain areas that worked with another organization called The United Farmers League that was a communist led group formed in 1930 and 1931 and worked with Farmers Holiday. The Farm Holiday Association had done strikes related to other areas of agriculture and related industries such as strikes on livestock in different states and trying to keep farmers in different states on the same side of boycotts and protests. Farmers Holiday had a larger impact in the Wisconsin milk strikes by doing milk strikes in other states around the same time and attempting to coordinate strikes to be more effective across state lines targeting certain cities.

== February strike ==
The first set of strikes ran from February 15 to 22. They were mainly confined to strike strongholds and centered on the area controlled by the Wisconsin Cooperative Milk Pool, led by Walter M. Singler, in the Fox Valley.

The first blood shed in the strike was reported to be near Appleton, Wisconsin, when milk convoy guards threw heavy objects like horse shoes at a group of 100 strikers.

== May strike ==
The second in the series of strikes ran from May 13 to 19. These strikes spread to a larger part of Wisconsin and resulted in more violence than the February strike.

In Shawano County, 30 people were injured when the National Guardsmen, sworn in as deputies and charged with keeping the roads open against the pickets "engaged in a pitched battle" in front of a dairy plant. "The strikers won the skirmish, dumping the milk and driving the deputies to cover by throwing back their own tear gas bombs."

National Guardsmen with fixed bayonets and tear gas forced pickets from Durham Hill in Waukesha County, May 16, 1933.

25,000 pounds (11,000 kg) of milk was deliberately tainted with kerosene at a creamery near Farmington in Jefferson County.

On May 16, a guardsman shot two teenagers, killing one of them, after they failed to stop their vehicle in Racine County.

On May 18, a farmer in his 50s was killed when he fell or was pushed from the running board of a milk delivery truck after it left a picket road block between Saukville and Grafton in Ozaukee County.

On May 19, the milk pool began a temporary peace with the state government in Madison to discuss options to end the strikes. The five points the milk pool wanted examined were: First, to recall the National Guard from the protests; to abolish the two-price system for milk; to reorganize the Department of Agriculture; to prohibit chain stores from manufacturing and processing food, thereby weakening them; and recognition of the organization of dairy farmers.

== October-to-November strike ==
The third series of strikes ran from October 21 to November 18 and a larger portion of Wisconsin was affected by them.

Creameries near Plymouth and Fond du Lac, Wisconsin were bombed around November 1, 1933. A cheese factory near Belgium, Ozaukee County, Wisconsin was dynamited and burned by the 4th of the week. Creameries in Krakow and Zachow, in Shawano County, Wisconsin, were bombed on Friday, November 3, 1933. In all, seven creameries were bombed and thousands of pounds of milk were dumped.

On October 28, 1933, a 60-year-old farmer was killed at a picket line in the Town of Burke after a single bullet was fired into the crowd by a passenger in a car stopped by the crowd. The farmer had not been part of the picket and was there delivering food to the strikers. The shooter had been angered over a headlight a striker had broken while the shooter's vehicle was running the picket line earlier in the night. The shooter was later sentenced to two to four years in prison after pleading guilty to manslaughter charges.

== Aftermath ==
Local newspapers reported that farmers lost $10 million during the strikes. After 1933, Singler's Cooperative Milk Pool purchased creameries to help increase the profits of its members, but the milk pool later faded into obscurity. The economy eventually improved, helping smaller farmers to earn more money, but it is not clear if the strikes aided this recovery.

== Notable individuals involved ==
- Walter M. Singler, head of the Wisconsin Cooperative Milk Pool
- Wisconsin Governor Albert G. Schmedeman
- Milo Reno, National Farm Holiday Association president
- Arnold Gilberts, president of the Wisconsin Farmers' Holiday Association

== See also ==
- Iowa Cow War
- National Farmers Organization
- Aaron Sapiro
- Milk quota
- Wisconsin dairy industry
