= Hoffman Barn (Revillo, South Dakota) =

Historic barn in South Dakota, United States

- U.S. National Register of Historic Places
- Location within South Dakota Location within the United States
- Location: 16937 482 Ave., near Revillo, South Dakota
- Coordinates: 44°55′47″N 96°33′31″W
- Area: less than one acre
- Built: 1920
- Built by: Ling, John
- Architectural style: Wisconsin Dairy Barn
- NRHP reference No.: 05001188
- Added to NRHP: October 26, 2005

The Hoffman Barn in Deuel County, South Dakota, near Revillo, was built in 1920. It is a Wisconsin Dairy Barn. It has also been known as Skatvold Barn. It was listed on the National Register of Historic Places in 2005.

It is a two-story wood Wisconsin Dairy Barn with a concrete full basement. It is 46 by 80 feet (14 m × 24 m) in plan. As of 2005, the exterior was painted "brownish" with white-painted trim.

It may be the barn located at exactly 44.927745°N 96.558592°W in 2018 Google satellite view imagery, in a farm located on County Road 513.
