= Darlington High School =

Location
- 11838 Center Hill Road; Darlington, Lafayetty County, Wisconsin 53530; United States
- 42.66522°N 90.12427°W

Information
- Type: Public
- School district: Darlington Community School District
- NCES District ID: 5503150
- Superintendent: Cale Jackson
- Principal: Mitch Austin
- Grades: 9-12
- Enrollment: 257 (2023-2024)
- Colors: Red, White
- Mascot: Redbird
- Website: darlington.k12.wi.us

Darlington High School is a public school for grades 9 to 12 in the town of Darlington, Wisconsin.

== History ==
In 1964, construction of a new Darlington High School began. The school district hoped to have it open by the 1965-1966 school year.

== Demographics ==
Un 2026, 70 percent of the school's 257 students were white and almost 29 percent were Hispanic. 40 percent of students were categorized as economically disadvantaged. It is part of the Darlington Community School District.

== Athletics ==
Redbirds are the school mascot. Its football team plays in Division 6. It won its fourth state championship in 1995. In 2025 it won its fifth state championship. Its team was undefeated with a record of 14-0 for the season.

== Alumni ==
- Alex Erickson, former NFL player
- Shelly Kittleson, journalist

== In the news ==
In 2011, the school made national headlines after a 21-year-old man posed as a 16-year-old student for a year. In 2023 a physical education teacher who had sex with a 16 year old student on multiple occasions was sentenced to probation
