= Sylvester W. Osborn =

American politician

Sylvester Webster Osborn (July 1, 1811 – November 4, 1903) was a member of the Wisconsin State Assembly.

== Biography ==
Osborn was a native of Delaware County, New York. Reports have differed on the date of his birth. In 1835, Osborn married Julia M. Gardner. They had four children. Among them were Sarah, whose husband Philo A. Orton became a member of the Assembly, and Charles F. Osborn, who was also a member of the Assembly.

Osborn settled in Darlington, Wisconsin in 1851. During the American Civil War, he served with the 16th Wisconsin Volunteer Infantry Regiment of the Union Army, achieving the rank of captain. He died on November 4, 1903.

== Political career ==
Osborn was a Republican member of the Assembly in 1865. In 1877, he was appointed Postmaster of Darlington.
