= Homer Dwight Chapman =

American scientist

Homer Dwight Chapman (October 4, 1898 – April 4, 2005) was an American scientist, scholar, author, and early pioneer in the development of leaf analysis for diagnosing plant nutrition. Chapman was also former director of the University of California Citrus Experiment Station and a founding faculty member at the University of California, Riverside.

== Early life and education ==
Chapman was born on October 4, 1898, in Darlington, Wisconsin, to William Chapman and Finetta Merriam Chapman. He was the youngest of six children, spending much of his time as a young boy along the Pecatonica River. At age 9, the family moved to a 28-acre farm in the outskirts of Darlington where they produced several goods for sale to the town. In 1917, Chapman graduated from Darlington High School and worked for a year doing odd jobs before attending college. Chapman enrolled at the University of Wisconsin in September 1918 and was drafted into the United States Army shortly thereafter, serving in World War I until he was honorably discharged in December 1918. He received his B.S. (1923), M.S. (1925), and Ph.D. (1927) degrees from the University of Wisconsin.

== Professional life ==
In 1927, Chapman joined the faculty of the University of California Citrus Experiment Station at the invitation of Dr. Walter P. Kelly and accepted the position of Assistant Chemist. He was appointed as Associate Chemist in 1938 and went on to become full Chemist and Professor in 1944. Chapman also chaired the Department of Soils and Plant Nutrition from 1938 to 1961 and directed the University of California Citrus Experiment Station from 1950 to 1951. He was instrumental in organizing the first International Citrus Symposium that was held in 1968. This symposium led to the formation of the International Society of Citriculture where Chapman served as Secretary from 1970-1986. In 1981, he was recognized for his service to the organization by being awarded the Society's first Honorary Membership.

== Personal life ==
Homer Dwight Chapman was married to Daisy Ernst in March 1928 by Reverend Catherwood at a ceremony held in Riverside, California. The couple never had any children and lived in Riverside, California, for much of their married life. In 1950, Chapman built the couple's first home, one that he and Daisy would occupy until 1993 when they relocated to Regents Point, a continuing care retirement community in Irvine, California. Chapman was an active member of the local Kiwanis Club in Riverside, California, for sixty-five years, serving as president in 1952. Daisy Chapman died at the age of 96 in 1999.

== Death and legacy ==
Homer Dwight Chapman died on April 4, 2005, at the age of 106. He was an active member of the Riverside, California, community for over sixty-five years and an avid supporter of the University of California, Riverside. Chapman and his wife Daisy established funds, upon their death, to support students in the sciences and performing arts. In his honor, the University of California, Riverside named the building that Chapman had worked in for many years while employed by the university, Chapman Hall.
