= Milk pool =

Economic system

A milk pool is a financial pooling system used by dairy farmers to ensure that all dairy producers receive similar per-gallon payments for their product at or above a legally regulated minimum. Farmers producing milk "of equal quality and composition" will receive the same amount of per-gallon payment regardless of how their product is utilized. Milk pooling allows farmers to reduce the financial risk associated with the milk market. Milk pooling is usually regulated at the state or province level; however in some countries, for example Canada, there exist milk pooling programs that encompass several provinces.
