= Olaf Stordahl Barn =

- U.S. National Register of Historic Places
- Location within South Dakota Location within the United States
- Location: 45210 199th St., near Arlington, South Dakota
- Coordinates: 44°30′15″N 97°9′52″W
- Area: less than one acre
- Built: 1918
- Built by: Stordahl, Olaf
- Architectural style: Wisconsin Dairy Barn
- NRHP reference No.: 02000575
- Added to NRHP: May 30, 2002

The Olaf Stordahl Barn, in Kingsbury County, South Dakota near Arlington, was built in 1918. It was listed on the National Register of Historic Places in 2002.

It is a Wisconsin Dairy Barn. It is a 50 by 67 feet (15 m × 20 m) barn built of brown, glazed clay hollow-tile bricks on its first floor. It has a concrete foundation and a gambrel roof. A concrete stave silo is attached.
