= Minnesota-Wisconsin price =

Former formula price for U.S. farm milk

The Minnesota-Wisconsin price (M-W price), prior to May 1995, was a component of the basic formula price for farm milk formerly used in federal milk marketing orders. It represented a survey of the average price Minnesota and Wisconsin plants were paying farmers for Grade B milk to be used in processed dairy products. In 1995, the M-W price was replaced with the basic formula price as the price mover under federal milk marketing orders.

== See also ==
- Wisconsin dairy industry
