= 1st Wisconsin Legislature =

Wisconsin legislative term

←	Territorial Legislature	2nd	→
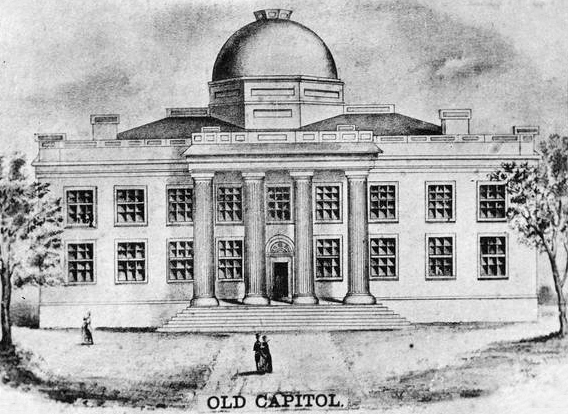
- Wisconsin State Capitol, 1855

Overview
- Legislative body: Wisconsin Legislature
- Meeting place: Wisconsin State Capitol
- Term: June 5, 1848 – January 1, 1849
- Election: May 8, 1848

Senate
- Members: 19
- Senate President: John Edwin Holmes
- Party control: Democratic

Assembly
- Members: 66
- Assembly Speaker: Ninian E. Whiteside
- Party control: Democratic

Sessions
- 1st: June 5, 1848 – August 21, 1848

The First Wisconsin Legislature convened from June 5, 1848, to August 21, 1848, in regular session.

Wisconsin voters ratified the Constitution of Wisconsin in a statewide referendum held on March 13, 1848, then held elections for statewide constitutional officers and legislators on May 8, 1848. Senators representing even-numbered districts were elected to serve through this term and the following term. Assemblymembers and odd-numbered senators were elected to serve only through the end of this term.

Wisconsin was formally admitted as the 30th U.S. state on May 29, 1848. Wisconsin's first governor, Democrat Nelson Dewey, of Grant County, was sworn in on the 3rd day of this legislative term. He was the only governor of Wisconsin during this legislative term.

== Major events ==
- May 8, 1848: Nelson Dewey elected Governor of Wisconsin.
- May 29, 1848: Wisconsin was admitted to the Union as the 30th State.
- June 7, 1848: Inauguration of Nelson Dewey as the first Governor of Wisconsin.
- June 8, 1848: The Wisconsin Legislature, in joint session, elected Henry Dodge and Isaac P. Walker as United States Senators.
- November 7, 1848: Zachary Taylor elected President of the United States. Wisconsin's electoral votes went to his opponent, Lewis Cass.

== Major legislation ==
- June 21, 1848: Joint resolution relative to free territory, 1848 Joint Resolutions p.285
- June 21, 1848: Act concerning the Attorney General, 1848 Acts pp.10-11
- June 29, 1848: Act to prescribe the duties of the State Treasurer, 1848 Acts pp.13-15
- June 29, 1848: Act to divide the State of Wisconsin into Congressional Districts, 1848 Acts pp.15-16
- June 29, 1848: Act to provide for the election of Judges and for the classification and organization of the Judiciary of the State of Wisconsin, 1848 Acts pp.19-24
- July 26, 1848: Act to establish the University of Wisconsin, 1848 Acts pp.37-40
- July 29, 1848: Act to Exempt a Homestead from forced sale, 1848 Acts pp.40-41
- August 8, 1848: Act to incorporate the City of Racine in the county of Racine, 1848 Acts pp.80-100
- August 12, 1848: Act prescribing the powers and duties of the Secretary of State, 1848 Acts pp.115-120
- August 16, 1848: Act to provide for the Election and define the duties of State Superintendent of Public Instruction, 1848 Acts pp.127-129
- August 21, 1848: Act to provide for holding general and special Elections, the time when, the manner of holding the same, and the qualifications, disabilities, and privileges of electors, 1848 Acts pp.191-207
- August 21, 1848: Act in relation to Public Schools, 1848 Acts pp.226-247

== Party summary ==
=== Senate summary ===
Senate partisan composition Democratic: 16 seats Whig: 3 seats

	Party (Shading indicates majority caucus)			Total	
	Democratic	Free Soil	Whig	Total	Vacant
1st Session	16	0	3	19	0
Final voting share	84%	0%	16%		
Beginning of the next Legislature	14	1	4	19	0

=== Assembly summary ===
Assembly partisan composition Democratic: 49 seats Whig: 17 seats

	Party (Shading indicates majority caucus)			Total	
	Democratic	Free Soil	Whig	Total	Vacant
1st Session	49	0	17	66	0
Final voting share	74%	0%	26%		
Beginning of the next Legislature	35	14	17	66	0

== Sessions ==
- 1st Regular session: June 4, 1848 – August 21, 1848

== Leaders ==
=== Senate leadership ===
- President of the Senate: John E. Holmes, Lieutenant Governor

=== Assembly leadership ===
- Speaker of the Assembly: Ninian E. Whiteside

== Members ==
=== Members of the Senate ===
Members of the Wisconsin Senate for the First Wisconsin Legislature (19):

Senate partisan representation Democratic: 16 seats Whig: 3 seats

District	Counties	Senator	Party	Residence
01	Brown, Calumet, Manitowoc, Sheboygan	Harrison C. Hobart	Dem.	Sheboygan
02	Columbia, Marquette, Portage, Sauk	Henry Merrill	Whig	Fort Winnebago
03	Crawford, Chippewa, St. Croix, La Pointe	Daniel G. Fenton	Dem.	Prairie du Chien
04	Fond du Lac, Winnebago	Warren Chase	Dem.	Ceresco
05	Iowa, Richland	Henry M. Billings	Dem.	Highland
06	Grant	George W. Lakin	Whig	Platteville
07	Lafayette	Thomas K. Gibson	Dem.	Benton
08	Green	Elisha T. Gardner	Dem.	Monroe
09	Dane	Simeon Mills	Dem.	Madison
10	Dodge	William M. Dennis	Dem.	Watertown
11	Washington	Frederick W. Horn	Dem.	Cedarburg
12	Jefferson	Myron B. Williams	Dem.	Watertown
13	Waukesha	Joseph Turner	Dem.	Prairieville
14	Walworth	John W. Boyd	Dem.	Geneva
15	Rock	Otis W. Norton	Whig	Milton
16	Racine (Southern half)	C. Latham Sholes	Dem.	Racine
17	Racine (Northern half)	Philo White	Dem.	Racine
18	Milwaukee (Southern half)	Asa Kinney	Dem.	Milwaukee
19	Milwaukee (Northern half)	Riley N. Messenger	Dem.	Milwaukee

=== Members of the Assembly ===
Members of the Assembly for the First Wisconsin Legislature (66):

Assembly partisan representation Democratic: 49 seats Whig: 17 seats

Senate District	Assembly District		Representative	Party	Residence
01	Brown		David Agry	Dem.	Green Bay
01	Calumet		Lemuel Goodell	Dem.	Stockbridge
02	Columbia		Joseph Kerr	Whig	Randolph
03	Crawford–Chippewa		William T. Sterling	Dem.	Mount Sterling
09	Dane	1st	Henry M. Warner	Dem.	Cottage Grove
09	Dane	2nd	Ebenezer Brigham	Whig	Blue Mounds
09	Dane	3rd	Samuel H. Roys	Dem.	Stoughton
10	Dodge	1st	Lorenzo Merrill	Dem.	Beaver Dam
10	Dodge	2nd	Charles Billinghurst	Dem.	Juneau
10	Dodge	3rd	Benjamin Randall	Dem.	Lebanon
10	Dodge	4th	Stephen Jones	Whig	Lowell
10	Dodge	5th	Monroe Thompson	Whig	Fox Lake
04	Fond du Lac	1st	Charles Doty	Whig	Fond du Lac
04	Fond du Lac	2nd	Jonathan Daugherty	Whig	Rosendale
06	Grant	1st	James Gilmore	Whig	Jamestown
06	Grant	2nd	Noah Virgin	Whig	Platteville
06	Grant	3rd	Armisted C. Brown	Whig	Potosi
06	Grant	4th	Arthur W. Worth	Dem.	Lancaster
08	Green		Henry Adams	Dem.	Monticello
05	Iowa–Richland	1st	Abner Nichols	Dem.	Mineral Point
05	Iowa–Richland	2nd	Thomas Jenkins	Dem.	Dodgeville
12	Jefferson	1st	Wales Emmons	Dem.	Watertown
12	Jefferson	2nd	Peter H. Turner	Dem.	Palmyra
12	Jefferson	3rd	Davenport Rood	Dem.	Jefferson
03	La Pointe–St. Croix		William R. Marshall (until June 6, 1848)	Dem.	St. Croix Falls
03	La Pointe–St. Croix		Joseph Bowron (from June 13, 1848)	Dem.	St. Croix Falls
07	Lafayette	1st	Ninian E. Whiteside	Dem.	Belmont
07	Lafayette	2nd	Elias Slothower	Dem.	Gratiot
01	Manitowoc		Ezra Durgin	Dem.	Manitowoc
02	Marquette		Archibald Nichols	Whig	Markesan
19	Milwaukee	1	Edward Wunderly	Dem.	Milwaukee
19	Milwaukee	2	Augustus Greulich	Dem.	Milwaukee
18	Milwaukee	3	William W. Brown	Whig	Milwaukee
18	Milwaukee	4	Leonard P. Crary	Dem.	Milwaukee
18	Milwaukee	5	Andrew Sullivan	Dem.	Milwaukee
18	Milwaukee	6	Horace Chase	Dem.	Milwaukee
19	Milwaukee	7	Perley J. Shumway	Dem.	Wauwatosa
02	Portage		James M. Campbell	Dem.	Stevens Point
17	Racine	1st	David McDonald	Dem.	Racine
17	Racine	2nd	Henry B. Roberts	Dem.	Caledonia
17	Racine	3	Samuel E. Chapman	Whig	Rochester
16	Racine	4th	Julius L. Gilbert	Dem.	Racine
16	Racine	5th	Elias Woodworth Jr.	Dem.	Bristol
15	Rock	1	G. F. A. Atherton	Dem.	Emerald Grove
15	Rock	2	Robert T. Carey	Whig	Beloit
15	Rock	3	Alanson B. Vaughan	Whig	Union
15	Rock	4	Albert P. Blakeslee	Dem.	Johnstown
15	Rock	5	Nathaniel Strong	Dem.	Beloit
02	Sauk		Delando Pratt	Dem.	Baraboo
01	Sheboygan	1	Charles E. Morris	Dem.	Sheboygan
01	Sheboygan	2	Jedediah Brown	Dem.	Sheboygan Falls
14	Walworth	1	Gaylord Graves	Dem.	East Troy
14	Walworth	2	Prosper Cravath	Whig	Whitewater
14	Walworth	3	Erasmus D. Richardson	Dem.	Geneva
14	Walworth	4	Hugh Long	Dem.	Darien
14	Walworth	5	Milo Kelsey	Whig	Delavan
11	Washington	1st	Henry Allen	Dem.	Port Washington
11	Washington	2nd	Benjamin H. Mooers	Dem.	Grafton
11	Washington	3rd	Adolphus Zimmermann	Dem.	Mequon
11	Washington	4th	Densmore Maxon	Dem.	Cedar Creek
11	Washington	5th	William Caldwell	Whig	Barton
13	Waukesha	1	Joseph W. Brackett	Dem.	Brookfield
13	Waukesha	2	Dewey K. Warren	Dem.	Delafield
13	Waukesha	3	Chauncey G. Heath	Dem.	Pewaukee
13	Waukesha	4	George M. Humphrey	Dem.	New Berlin
13	Waukesha	5	Joseph Bond	Dem.	Mukwonago
04	Winnebago		Erasmus D. Hall	Whig	Waukau

== Employees ==
=== Senate employees ===
- Chief Clerk: Henry G. Abbey
- Writer: R. L. Ream
- Writer: Henry Lines
- Writer: E. P. Lockhart
- Sergeant-at-Arms: Lyman H. Seaver
- Chaplain: H. W. Reed

=== Assembly employees ===
- Chief Clerk: Daniel Noble Johnson
- Chief Clerk pro tem: La Fayette Kellogg
- Assistant Clerk: T. A. B. Boyd
- Enrolling Clerk: Aaron V. Fryer
- Writer: Ira W. Bird
- Writer: James Murdock
- Messenger: Henry Starks
- Doorkeeper: Samuel Parkhurst
- Sergeant-at-Arms: John Mullanphy
- Chaplain: John Penman
- Chaplain: Charles Lord
