= Wisconsin's Washington County 5th Assembly district =

Former American legislative district

Wisconsin's Washington County 5th State Assembly district
- Obsolete
- Notes: 1848–1852

Wisconsin's Washington County 5th Assembly district was a district in the Wisconsin State Assembly for several years in the early history of the state of Wisconsin, prior to the legislative redistricting reforms of 1972 which created the current numbered districts. Located in southeast Wisconsin, the district was one of the 66 original Assembly districts defined in Article XIV of the Constitution of Wisconsin. The Constitution originally allocated five districts for Washington County, Wisconsin—at a time when Washington County also comprised all of the territory of what is now Ozaukee County, Wisconsin; this district originally comprised the northwest quadrant of Washington County.

The district was in use for the first five elections in Wisconsin's history, from 1848 to 1851.

== List of representatives ==
List of representatives from the Washington County 5th district
Member	Party	Residence	Term start	Term end	Leg.
District created
William Caldwell	Whig	Barton	June 5, 1848	January 1, 1849	1st
Chauncey M. Phelps	Dem.	Addison	January 1, 1849	January 7, 1850	2nd
Henry Weil	Dem.	West Bend	January 7, 1850	January 6, 1851	3rd
Francis Everley	Dem.	West Bend	January 6, 1851	January 5, 1852	4th
Baruch Schleisinger Weil	Dem.	West Bend	January 5, 1852	January 3, 1853	5th
District abolished by 1852 Wisconsin Act 499; Washington County was consolidated into the Washington 1st (later Ozaukee 1st), Washington 2nd (later Ozaukee 2nd), Washington 3rd (later Washington 1st) and Washington 4th (later Washington 2nd) Assembly districts
