= Wisconsin's Grant County 4th Assembly district =

Former American legislative district

Wisconsin's Grant County 4th State Assembly district
- Obsolete
- Notes: 1848–1876

Wisconsin's Grant County 4th Assembly district was a district in the Wisconsin State Assembly for several years in the early history of the state of Wisconsin, prior to the legislative redistricting reforms of 1972 which created the current numbered districts. Located in southwest Wisconsin, the district was one of the 66 original Assembly districts defined in Article XIV of the Constitution of Wisconsin. The Constitution originally allocated four districts for Grant County, Wisconsin; the 3rd district originally comprised the north and western parts of Grant County.

The district was in use for the first 28 years of Wisconsin's history, from 1848 to 1876.

== List of representatives ==
List of representatives from the Grant County 4th district
Member	Party	Residence	Term start	Term end	Leg.
District created
Arthur W. Worth	Dem.	Lancaster	June 5, 1848	January 1, 1849	1st
Robert M. Briggs	Whig	Beetown	January 1, 1849	January 7, 1850	2nd
John B. Turley	Dem.	Cassville	January 7, 1850	January 6, 1851	3rd
Robert M. Briggs	Whig	Beetown	January 6, 1851	January 5, 1852	4th
J. Allen Barber	Whig	Lancaster	January 5, 1852	January 2, 1854	5th 6th
William Jeffrey	Dem.	Ellenboro	January 2, 1854	January 1, 1855	7th
William W. Field	Rep.	Platteville	January 1, 1855	January 7, 1856	8th
Joseph Trotter Mills	Rep.	Lancaster	January 7, 1856	January 4, 1858	9th 10th
Charles K. Dean	Rep.	Boscobel	January 4, 1858	January 3, 1859	11th
Hugh A. W. McNair	Rep.	Fennimore	January 3, 1859	January 2, 1860	12th
Samuel F. Clise	Rep.	Ellenboro	January 2, 1860	January 7, 1861	13th
John G. Clark	Rep.	Lancaster	January 7, 1861	January 6, 1862	14th
William W. Field	Rep.	Fennimore	January 6, 1862	January 1, 1866	15th 16th 17th 18th
George H. Washburn	Union	Millville	January 1, 1866	January 7, 1867	19th
Hugh A. W. McNair	Union	Fennimore	January 7, 1867	January 6, 1868	20th
Matthew Birchard	Rep.	Fennimore	January 6, 1868	January 4, 1869	21st
Benjamin M. Coates	Rep.	Boscobel	January 4, 1869	January 3, 1870	22nd
Hugh A. W. McNair	Rep.	Fennimore	January 3, 1870	January 2, 1871	23rd
William W. Field	Rep.	Boscobel	January 2, 1871	January 1, 1872	24th
Jerome Bonaparte Cory	Rep.	Patch Grove	January 1, 1872	January 6, 1873	25th
Christopher Hutchinson	Rep.	Beetown	January 6, 1873	January 5, 1874	26th
Robert Glenn	Rep.	Wyalusing	January 5, 1874	January 4, 1875	27th
Delos Abrams	Rep.	Bloomington	January 4, 1875	January 3, 1876	28th
William John McCoy	Dem.	Beetown	January 3, 1876	January 1, 1877	29th
District abolished by 1876 Wisconsin Act 343; Grant County was consolidated into the Grant 1st, Grant 2nd, and Grant 3rd Assembly districts
