= Wisconsin's Washington County 4th Assembly district =

Former American legislative district

Wisconsin's Washington County 4th State Assembly district
- Obsolete
- Notes: 1848–1852

Wisconsin's Washington County 4th Assembly district was a district in the Wisconsin State Assembly in the early years of the history of the state of Wisconsin, prior to the legislative redistricting reforms of 1972 which created the current numbered districts. Located in southeast Wisconsin, the district was one of the 66 original Assembly districts defined in Article XIV of the Constitution of Wisconsin. The Constitution originally allocated five districts for Washington County, Wisconsin—which at that time also comprised all of what is now Ozaukee County, Wisconsin; the 4th district originally comprised roughly the southwest quadrant of Washington County.

The district was in use for elections from 1848 to 1851.

== List of representatives ==
List of representatives from the Washington County 4th district
Member	Party	Residence	Term start	Term end	Leg.
District created
Densmore Maxon	Dem.	Cedar Creek	June 5, 1848	January 1, 1849	1st
Patrick Toland	Dem.	Erin	January 1, 1849	January 7, 1850	2nd
Edward Divin	Dem.	Richfield	January 7, 1850	January 6, 1851	3rd
John C. Toll	Dem.	Cedar Creek	January 6, 1851	January 5, 1852	4th
Densmore Maxon	Dem.	Cedar Creek	January 5, 1852	January 3, 1853	5th
District abolished by 1852 Wisconsin Act 499; Washington County was consolidated into the Washington 1st and Washington 2nd Assembly districts Ozaukee County was consolidated into the Ozaukee 1st and Ozaukee 2nd Assembly districts
