= Wisconsin's Washington County 3rd Assembly district =

Former American legislative district

Wisconsin's Washington County 3rd State Assembly district
- Obsolete
- Notes: 1848–1852; 1856–1866

Wisconsin's Washington County 3rd Assembly district was a district in the Wisconsin State Assembly in the early years of the history of the state of Wisconsin, prior to the legislative redistricting reforms of 1972 which created the current numbered districts. Located in southeast Wisconsin, the district was one of the 66 original Assembly districts defined in Article XIV of the Constitution of Wisconsin. The Constitution originally allocated five districts for Washington County, Wisconsin—which at that time also comprised all of what is now Ozaukee County, Wisconsin; the 3rd district originally comprised the a strip of the southeast quadrant of that larger Washington County, including the southern quarter of what is now Ozaukee County.

The district was in use for elections from 1848 to 1851, then again from 1856 through 1865.

== List of representatives ==
List of representatives from the Washington County 3rd district
Member	Party	Residence	Term start	Term end	Leg.
District created
Adolphus Zimmermann	Dem.	Mequon	June 5, 1848	January 1, 1849	1st
Peter Turck	Dem.	Mequon	January 1, 1849	January 7, 1850	2nd
Cornelius S. Griffin	Dem.	Saukville	January 7, 1850	January 6, 1851	3rd
Frederick Stock	Dem.	Mequon	January 6, 1851	January 5, 1852	4th
Adam Staats	Dem.	Staatsville	January 5, 1852	January 3, 1853	5th
District abolished by 1852 Wisconsin Act 499; Washington County was consolidated into the Washington 1st and Washington 2nd Assembly districts Ozaukee County was consolidated into the Ozaukee 1st and Ozaukee 2nd Assembly districts
District re-established by 1856 Wisconsin Act 109
James Fagan	Dem.	Cedarburg	January 5, 1857	January 4, 1858	10th
Charles W. Detmering	Dem.	Newburg	January 4, 1858	January 3, 1859	11th
Phillip Zimmerman	Dem.	Staatsville	January 3, 1859	January 2, 1860	12th
Tisdale Vander Cook	Rep.	Newburg	January 2, 1860	January 7, 1861	13th
Valentine Schaetzel	Dem.	Menomonee Falls	January 7, 1861	January 6, 1862	14th
Robert Salter	Dem.	Newburg	January 6, 1862	January 1, 1863	15th
Martin Schottler	Dem.	Staatsville	January 1, 1863	January 2, 1865	16th 17th
Ernst Franckenberg	Dem.	Newburg	January 2, 1865	January 1, 1866	18th
Philip Schneider	Dem.	Farmington	January 1, 1866	January 7, 1867	19th
District abolished by 1866 Wisconsin Act 101; Washington County was consolidated into the Washington 1st and Washington 2nd Assembly districts
