= Wisconsin's Crawford–Chippewa Assembly district =

Former American legislative district

Wisconsin's Crawford–Chippewa State Assembly district
- Obsolete
- Notes: 1848–1851

Wisconsin's Crawford–Chippewa Assembly district was a district in the Wisconsin State Assembly in the early years of the history of the state of Wisconsin, prior to the legislative redistricting reforms of 1972 which created the current numbered districts. Located in western Wisconsin, the district comprised all of Chippewa and Crawford counties, and was one of the 66 original Assembly districts defined in Article XIV of the Constitution of Wisconsin.

The district was in use for elections from 1848 through 1851. By 1851, the territory originally belonging to Crawford and Chippewa counties had been further divided into Crawford, Chippewa, La Crosse, and Bad Ax counties, but the Assembly district boundaries did not change.

== List of representatives ==
List of representatives from the Crawford–Chippewa district
Member	Party	Residence	Term start	Term end	Leg.
District created
William T. Sterling	Dem.	Mount Sterling	June 5, 1848	January 1, 1849	1st
James O'Neill	Dem.	Black River	January 1, 1849	January 7, 1850	2nd
William T. Sterling	Dem.	Mount Sterling	January 7, 1850	January 6, 1851	3rd
William T. Price	Dem.	Black River Falls	January 6, 1851	January 5, 1852	4th
Andrew Briggs	Dem.	Bad Ax	January 5, 1852	January 3, 1853	5th
District abolished by 1852 Wisconsin Act 499; Chippewa and La Crosse counties became part of the Chippewa–La Crosse district Crawford and Bad Ax counties became part of the Bad Ax–Crawford district
