= Wisconsin's Washington County 2nd Assembly district =

Former American legislative district

Wisconsin's Washington County 2nd State Assembly district
- Obsolete
- Notes: 1848–1888

Wisconsin's Washington County 2nd Assembly district was a district in the Wisconsin State Assembly for several years in the early history of the state of Wisconsin, prior to the legislative redistricting reforms of 1972 which created the current numbered districts. Located in southeast Wisconsin, the district was one of the 66 original Assembly districts defined in Article XIV of the Constitution of Wisconsin. The Constitution originally allocated five districts for Washington County, Wisconsin—which at that time also comprised all of what is now Ozaukee County, Wisconsin; the 1st district originally comprised a strip of the eastern part of that larger Washington County, including the part of what is now central Ozaukee County. Due to the timing of the 1852 redistricting versus the 1853 separation of Ozaukee County, this district was known as the Washington County 4th Assembly district in records of the 6th Wisconsin Legislature.

The district was in use for the first 38 years of Wisconsin's history, from 1848 to 1886.

== List of representatives ==
List of representatives from the Washington County 2nd district
Member	Party	Residence	Term start	Term end	Leg.
District created
Benjamin H. Mooers	Dem.	Grafton	June 5, 1848	January 1, 1849	1st
James Fagan	Dem.	Jackson	January 1, 1849	January 7, 1850	2nd
Eugene S. Turner	Dem.	Grafton	January 7, 1850	January 6, 1851	3rd
Frederick W. Horn	Dem.	Cedarburg	January 6, 1851	January 5, 1852	4th
Phineas M. Johnson	Dem.	Grafton	January 5, 1852	January 3, 1853	5th
William P. Barnes	Dem.	Barton	January 3, 1853	January 2, 1854	6th
Adam Schantz	Dem.	Addison	January 2, 1854	January 1, 1855	7th
Mitchell Delaney	Rep.	Barton	January 1, 1855	January 7, 1856	8th
John Sell	Dem.	Addison	January 7, 1856	January 5, 1857	9th
James Vollmar	Dem.	West Bend	January 5, 1857	January 4, 1858	10th
Paul A. Weil	Dem.	Richfield	January 4, 1858	January 3, 1859	11th
James Vollmar	Dem.	West Bend	January 3, 1859	January 2, 1860	12th
Matthias Altenhofen	Dem.	Kewaskum	January 2, 1860	January 7, 1861	13th
Leander F. Frisby	Rep.	West Bend	January 7, 1861	January 6, 1862	14th
Michael Maloy	Dem.	Richfield	January 6, 1862	January 1, 1863	15th
Henry Hildebrandt	Dem.	Station	January 1, 1863	January 2, 1865	16th 17th
Mitchell Delaney	Dem.	Barton	January 2, 1865	January 7, 1867	18th 19th
Densmore Maxon	Dem.	Cedar Creek	January 7, 1867	January 1, 1872	20th 21st 22nd 23rd 24th
Baruch Schleisinger Weil	Dem.	Schleisingerville	January 1, 1872	January 5, 1874	25th 26th
Jeremiah Riordan	Dem.	Trenton	January 5, 1874	January 4, 1875	27th
Philip Schneider	Dem.	Barton	January 4, 1875	January 1, 1877	28th 29th
Nicholaus Marx	Dem.	Farmington	January 1, 1877	January 7, 1878	30th
Cornelius Coughlin	Gbk.	West Bend	January 7, 1878	January 6, 1879	31st
John G. Frank	Dem.	Jackson	January 6, 1879	January 5, 1880	32nd
Baruch Schleisinger Weil	Dem.	West Bend	January 5, 1880	January 3, 1881	33rd
Joseph W. Holehouse	Dem.	Barton	January 3, 1881	January 1, 1883	34th 35th
Philip Schneider	Dem.	Farmington	January 1, 1883	January 5, 1885	36th
Frederick C. Schuler	Dem.	Farmington	January 5, 1885	January 7, 1889	37th 38th
District abolished by 1887 Wisconsin Act 461; Washington County was consolidated as a single-county Assembly district
