= Wisconsin's Jefferson County 3rd Assembly district =

Former American legislative district

Wisconsin's Jefferson County 3rd State Assembly district
- Obsolete
- Notes: 1848–1882

Wisconsin's Jefferson County 3rd Assembly district was a district in the Wisconsin State Assembly for several years in the early history of the state of Wisconsin, prior to the legislative redistricting reforms of 1972 which created the current numbered districts. Located in southeast Wisconsin, the district was one of the 66 original Assembly districts defined in Article XIV of the Constitution of Wisconsin. The Constitution originally allocated three districts for Jefferson County, Wisconsin; this district originally comprised roughly central and southwestern Jefferson County.

The district was in use for the first 34 years of Wisconsin's history, from 1848 to 1882. Under the 1856 redistricting plan, this district contained parts of Dodge County, as the Legislature had attempted in that same session to modify the boundaries of Jefferson and Dodge counties by moving several towns from Dodge to Jefferson; the modifications to county boundaries were struck down, but the districts based on those boundaries were left unchanged until the 1861 redistricting.

== List of representatives ==
List of representatives from the Jefferson County 3rd district
Member	Party	Residence	Term start	Term end	Leg.
District created
Davenport Rood	Dem.	Jefferson	June 5, 1848	January 1, 1849	1st
William H. Johnson	Dem.	Fort Atkinson	January 1, 1849	January 7, 1850	2nd
Alva Stewart	Whig	Fort Atkinson	January 7, 1850	January 6, 1851	3rd
Alonzo Wing	Dem.	Jefferson	January 6, 1851	January 5, 1852	4th
A. H. Van Norstrand	Dem.	Jefferson	January 5, 1852	January 3, 1853	5th
John Edwin Holmes	Dem.	Jefferson	January 3, 1853	January 2, 1854	6th
David L. Morrison	Dem.	Fort Atkinson	January 2, 1854	January 1, 1855	7th
A. H. Van Norstrand	Dem.	Jefferson	January 1, 1855	January 7, 1856	8th
David L. Morrison	Dem.	Koshkonong	January 7, 1856	January 5, 1857	9th
William Chappell	Dem.	Watertown	January 5, 1857	January 4, 1858	10th
Peter Rogan	Dem.	Watertown	January 4, 1858	January 3, 1859	11th
Luther A. Cole	Dem.	Watertown	January 3, 1859	January 2, 1860	12th
Heber Smith	Rep.	Watertown	January 2, 1860	January 7, 1861	13th
Theodore Prentiss	Dem.	Watertown	January 7, 1861	January 6, 1862	14th
William W. Reed	Rep.	Jefferson	January 6, 1862	January 5, 1863	15th
Lucien B. Caswell	Rep.	Fort Atkinson	January 5, 1863	January 4, 1864	16th
Joseph Powers	Union	Hebron	January 4, 1864	January 2, 1865	17th
Alanson Pike	Union	Whitewater	January 2, 1865	January 1, 1866	18th
William W. Reed	Union	Jefferson	January 1, 1866	January 6, 1868	19th 20th
Jonas Folts	Dem.	Hebron	January 6, 1868	January 4, 1869	21st
Joseph Winslow	Dem.	Fort Atkinson	January 4, 1869	January 3, 1870	22nd
Wilbur H. Tousley	Dem.	Jefferson	January 3, 1870	January 2, 1871	23rd
Nelson Fryer	Dem.	Cold Spring	January 2, 1871	January 1, 1872	24th
Lucien B. Caswell	Rep.	Fort Atkinson	January 1, 1872	January 6, 1873	25th
James W. Ostrander	Rep.	Jefferson	January 6, 1873	January 5, 1874	26th
Lucien B. Caswell	Rep.	Fort Atkinson	January 5, 1874	January 4, 1875	27th
James W. Ostrander	Rep.	Jefferson	January 4, 1875	January 3, 1876	28th
David Whitney Curtis	Rep.	Fort Atkinson	January 3, 1876	January 1, 1877	29th
Adolf Scheuber	Dem.	Sullivan	January 1, 1877	January 7, 1878	30th
Hiram J. Ball	Dem.	Palmyra	January 7, 1878	January 6, 1879	31st
James W. Ostrander	Rep.	Jefferson	January 6, 1879	January 5, 1880	32nd
Samuel A. Craig	Dem.	Fort Atkinson	January 5, 1880	January 2, 1882	33rd 34th
James W. Ostrander	Rep.	Jefferson	January 2, 1882	January 1, 1883	35th
District abolished by 1882 Wisconsin Act 242; Jefferson County was consolidated into the Jefferson 1st and Jefferson 2nd Assembly districts
