= Wisconsin's Manitowoc County Assembly district =

Former American legislative district

Wisconsin's Manitowoc County State Assembly district
- Obsolete
- Notes: 1848–1856

Wisconsin's Manitowoc County Assembly district was a district in the Wisconsin State Assembly in the early years of the history of the state of Wisconsin, prior to the legislative redistricting reforms of 1972 which created the current numbered districts. Located in eastern Wisconsin, the district comprised the whole of Manitowoc County, Wisconsin, and was one of the 66 original Assembly districts defined in Article XIV of the Constitution of Wisconsin.

The district was in use for elections from 1848 through 1855. The boundaries of Manitowoc County adjusted slightly during this period, resulting in a minor change to the Assembly district boundaries.

== List of representatives ==
List of representatives from the Manitowoc County district
Member	Party	Residence	Term start	Term end	Leg.
District created
Ezra Durgin	Dem.	Manitowoc	June 5, 1848	January 1, 1849	1st
Charles Kuehn	Dem.	Two Rivers	January 1, 1849	January 6, 1851	2nd 3rd
G. C. Oscar Malmros	Dem.	Manitowoc	January 6, 1851	January 5, 1852	4th
Ezekiel Ricker	Dem.	Manitowoc	January 5, 1852	January 2, 1854	5th 6th
James L. Kyle	Whig	Manitowoc	January 2, 1854	January 1, 1855	7th
James Bennett	Rep.	Manitowoc	January 1, 1855	January 7, 1856	8th
Charles H. Walker	Dem.	Manitowoc	January 7, 1856	January 5, 1857	9th
District abolished by 1856 Wisconsin Act 109; Manitowoc County divided into the Manitowoc 1st and Manitowoc 2nd districts
