= Wisconsin's Winnebago County Assembly district =

Former American legislative district

Wisconsin's Winnebago County State Assembly district
- Obsolete
- Notes: 1848–1852

Wisconsin's Winnebago County Assembly district was a district in the Wisconsin State Assembly in the early years of the history of the state of Wisconsin, prior to the legislative redistricting reforms of 1972 which created the current numbered districts. Located in central Wisconsin, the district comprised the whole of Winnebago County, Wisconsin, and was one of the 66 original Assembly districts defined in Article XIV of the Constitution of Wisconsin.

The district was in use for elections from 1848 through 1851. For most of the time that this district existed, Winnebago County and, thus, this district, was larger than the modern boundaries of Winnebago County; at times it encompassed much of what is now Waupaca County and all of the territory west of the Wolf River and east of the present eastern boundary of Marathon County. Waupaca County was formally created from parts of Winnebago and Brown counties in 1851, but remained part of this Assembly district until the 1852 redistricting.

== List of representatives ==
List of representatives from the Winnebago County district
Member	Party	Residence	Term start	Term end	Leg.
District created
Erasmus D. Hall	Whig	Waukau	June 5, 1848	January 1, 1849	1st
Thomas J. Townsend	Whig	Winnebago	January 1, 1849	January 7, 1850	2nd
Leonard P. Crary	Dem.	Oshkosh	January 7, 1850	January 6, 1851	3rd
Edward Eastman	F.S.	Oshkosh	January 6, 1851	January 5, 1852	4th
Dudley Blodget	Whig	Oshkosh	January 5, 1852	January 3, 1853	5th
District abolished by 1852 Wisconsin Act 499; Winnebago County divided into the Winnebago 1st and Winnebago 2nd districts Waupaca County became part of the Oconto–Outagamie–Waupaca district
