= Wisconsin's Washington County 1st Assembly district =

Former American legislative district

Wisconsin's Washington County 1st State Assembly district
- Obsolete
- Notes: 1848–1888

Wisconsin's Washington County 1st Assembly district was a district in the Wisconsin State Assembly for several years in the early history of the state of Wisconsin, prior to the legislative redistricting reforms of 1972 which created the current numbered districts. Located in southeast Wisconsin, the district was one of the 66 original Assembly districts defined in Article XIV of the Constitution of Wisconsin. The Constitution originally allocated five districts for Washington County, Wisconsin—which at that time also comprised all of what is now Ozaukee County, Wisconsin; the 1st district originally comprised the northeast quadrant of that larger Washington County, including the northern half of what is now Ozaukee County. Due to the timing of the 1852 redistricting versus the 1853 separation of Ozaukee County, this district was known as the Washington County 3rd Assembly district in records of the 6th Wisconsin Legislature.

The district was in use for the first 38 years of Wisconsin's history, from 1848 to 1886.

== List of representatives ==
List of representatives from the Washington County 1st district
Member	Party	Residence	Term start	Term end	Leg.
District created
Henry Allen	Dem.	Port Washington	June 5, 1848	January 1, 1849	1st
Solon Johnson	Dem.	Port Washington	January 1, 1849	January 6, 1851	2nd 3rd
Harvey Moore	Dem.	Port Washington	January 6, 1851	January 5, 1852	4th
Simon D. Powers	Dem.	Port Washington	January 5, 1852	January 3, 1853	5th
Charles Schutte	Dem.	Meeker	January 3, 1853	January 2, 1854	6th
Phillip Zimmerman	Dem.	Germantown	January 2, 1854	January 1, 1855	7th
Byron Smith	Dem.	Erin	January 1, 1855	January 7, 1856	8th
Thomas Hayes	Dem.	Richfield	January 7, 1856	January 5, 1857	9th
Hopewell Coxe	Dem.	Hartford	January 5, 1857	January 4, 1858	10th
James Kenealy	Dem.	Toland's Prairie	January 4, 1858	January 3, 1859	11th
Gustave Streckewald	Dem.	Hartford	January 3, 1859	January 2, 1860	12th
George Kiefer	Dem.	Nenno	January 2, 1860	January 7, 1861	13th
Nathan Parker	Dem.	Hartford	January 7, 1861	January 6, 1862	14th
Thomas Barry	Dem.	Erin	January 6, 1862	January 1, 1863	15th
Adam Schantz	Dem.	Addison	January 1, 1863	January 4, 1864	16th
Nicholaus Marx	Dem.	Wayne	January 4, 1864	January 2, 1865	17th
George C. Williams	Dem.	Hartford	January 2, 1865	January 1, 1866	18th
James Kenealy	Dem.	Toland's Prairie	January 1, 1866	January 7, 1867	19th
Charles H. Miller	Dem.	West Bend	January 7, 1867	January 6, 1868	20th
George H. Kleffler	Dem.	West Bend	January 6, 1868	January 4, 1869	21st
John Kastler	Dem.	Wayne	January 4, 1869	January 3, 1870	22nd
Henry V. R. Wilmot	Dem.	Trenton	January 3, 1870	January 2, 1871	23rd
Baruch Schleisinger Weil	Dem.	Schleisingerville	January 2, 1871	January 1, 1872	24th
Densmore W. Maxon	Dem.	Cedar Creek	January 1, 1872	January 6, 1873	25th
Hiram Wilson Sawyer	Dem.	Hartford	January 6, 1873	January 4, 1875	26th 27th
Andrew Martin	Dem.	Jackson	January 4, 1875	January 1, 1877	28th 29th
Frank Fitzgerald	Dem.	Hartford	January 1, 1877	January 7, 1878	30th
William Scollard	Dem.	Erin	January 7, 1878	January 6, 1879	31st
Jacob H. Muckerheide	Dem.	Kewaskum	January 6, 1879	January 5, 1880	32nd
Jacob C. Place	Dem.	Hartford	January 5, 1880	January 3, 1881	33rd
John F. Schwalbach	Dem.	Germantown	January 3, 1881	January 2, 1882	34th
Densmore Maxon	Dem.	Polk	January 2, 1882	January 1, 1883	35th
George Noller	Dem.	Richfield	January 1, 1883	January 5, 1885	36th
James Kenealy	Dem.	Erin	January 5, 1885	January 3, 1887	37th
James Kenealy	Ind.D.	Erin	January 3, 1887	January 7, 1889	38th
District abolished by 1887 Wisconsin Act 461; Washington County was consolidated as a single-county Assembly district
