= Wisconsin's Lafayette County 1st Assembly district =

Former American legislative district

Wisconsin's Lafayette County 1st State Assembly district
- Obsolete
- Notes: 1848–1871; 1876–1888

Wisconsin's Lafayette County 1st Assembly district was a district in the Wisconsin State Assembly for most of the history of the state of Wisconsin, up to the legislative redistricting reforms of 1972 which created the current numbered districts. Located in southern Wisconsin, the district was one of the 66 original Assembly districts defined in Article XIV of the Constitution of Wisconsin. The Constitution originally allocated two districts for Lafayette County, Wisconsin; this district originally comprised the northern and western parts of Lafayette County.

The district was in use for elections from 1848 to 1870, then again from 1876 to 1886.

== List of representatives ==
List of representatives from the Lafayette County 1st district
Member	Party	Residence	Term start	Term end	Leg.
District created
Ninian E. Whiteside	Dem.	Belmont	June 5, 1848	January 1, 1849	1st
Daniel Morgan Parkinson	Dem.	Fayette	January 1, 1849	January 7, 1850	2nd
Cornelius DeLong	Dem.	Belmont	January 7, 1850	January 6, 1851	3rd
Nathan Olmsted	Whig	Cottage Inn	January 6, 1851	January 5, 1852	4th
Matthew Murphy	Dem.	New Diggings	January 5, 1852	January 30, 1852	5th
George W. Hammett	Whig		January 30, 1852	January 3, 1853	5th
Eli Robinson	Dem.	Benton	January 3, 1853	January 2, 1854	6th
James Earnest	Dem.	New Diggings	January 2, 1854	January 7, 1856	7th 8th
Matthew Murphy	Dem.	Benton	January 7, 1856	January 5, 1857	9th
Joseph White	Dem.	Cottage Inn	January 5, 1857	January 4, 1858	10th
Hamilton H. Gray	Dem.	Darlington	January 4, 1858	January 3, 1859	11th
James S. Murphy	Dem.	Benton	January 3, 1859	January 2, 1860	12th
Thomas C. L. Mackay	Dem.	Elk Grove	January 2, 1860	January 6, 1862	13th 14th
Charles B. Jennings	Dem.	Benton	January 6, 1862	January 1, 1863	15th
Joseph White	Dem.	Cottage Inn	January 1, 1863	January 4, 1864	16th
Tarleton Dunn	Dem.	Elk Grove	January 4, 1864	January 2, 1865	17th
James Harker	Dem.	New Diggings	January 2, 1865	January 1, 1866	18th
David J. Seely	Dem.	Elk Grove	January 1, 1866	January 6, 1868	19th 20th
Charles Pole	Dem.	Shullsburg	January 6, 1868	January 3, 1870	21st 22nd
Thomas T. Duffy	Dem.	Benton	January 3, 1870	January 2, 1871	23rd
Patrick Galagan	Dem.	Elk Grove	January 2, 1871	January 1, 1872	24th
District abolished by 1871 Wisconsin Act 156; Lafayette County was consolidated as a single-county Assembly district
District re-established by 1876 Wisconsin Act 343
Andrew J. Anderson	Rep.	Argyle	January 1, 1877	January 7, 1878	30th
Lars E. Johnson	Dem.	Wiota	January 7, 1878	January 6, 1879	31st
Nelson La Due	Rep.	Wayne	January 6, 1879	January 5, 1880	32nd
Thomas E. Sheldon	Rep.	Darlington	January 5, 1880	January 3, 1881	33rd
Albert O. Chamberlain	Rep.	Darlington	January 3, 1881	January 1, 1883	34th 35th
James Samuel Gallagher	Dem.	Gratiot	January 1, 1883	January 5, 1885	36th
John Mason	Rep.	Wiota	January 5, 1885	January 3, 1887	37th
James Scott	Rep.	Darlington	January 3, 1887	January 7, 1889	38th
District abolished by 1887 Wisconsin Act 461; Lafayette and Green counties were organized into the Green–Lafayette 1st, Green–Lafayette 2nd, and Green–Lafayette 3rd Assembly districts
