= Wisconsin's Grant County 2nd Assembly district =

Former American legislative district

Wisconsin's Grant County 2nd State Assembly district
- Obsolete
- Notes: 1848–1954

Wisconsin's Grant County 2nd Assembly district was a district in the Wisconsin State Assembly for several years in the early history of the state of Wisconsin, prior to the legislative redistricting reforms of 1972 which created the current numbered districts. Located in southwest Wisconsin, the district was one of the 66 original Assembly districts defined in Article XIV of the Constitution of Wisconsin. The Constitution originally allocated four districts for Grant County, Wisconsin; the 2nd district originally comprised the northeast quadrant of Grant County.

The district was in use for the first 106 years of Wisconsin's history, from 1848 to 1954.

== List of representatives ==
List of representatives from the Grant County 2nd district
Member	Party	Residence	Term start	Term end	Leg.
District created
Noah Virgin	Whig	Platteville	June 5, 1848	January 1, 1849	1st
James Russell Vineyard	Dem.	Platteville	January 1, 1849	January 7, 1850	2nd
William McGonigal	Whig	Wingville	January 7, 1850	January 6, 1851	3rd
John N. Jones	Dem.	Platteville	January 6, 1851	January 5, 1852	4th
Noah Clemmons	Dem.	Platteville	January 5, 1852	January 3, 1853	5th
Hyman E. Block	Whig	Potosi	January 3, 1853	January 2, 1854	6th
William Hull	Dem.	Potosi	January 2, 1854	January 5, 1857	7th 8th 9th
Albert W. Emerey	Dem.	Potosi	January 5, 1857	January 3, 1859	10th 11th
James Wilson Seaton	Dem.	Potosi	January 3, 1859	January 7, 1861	12th 13th
Henry L. Massey	Rep.	Potosi	January 7, 1861	January 6, 1862	14th
Allen Taylor	Rep.	Dickeyville	January 6, 1862	January 1, 1863	15th
James F. Chapman	Dem.	Potosi	January 1, 1863	January 4, 1864	16th
Allen Taylor	Rep.	Dickeyville	January 4, 1864	January 1, 1866	17th 18th
Wiley Scribner	Union	Fair Play	January 1, 1866	January 7, 1867	19th
John Carthew	Union	Rockville	January 7, 1867	January 6, 1868	20th
James H. Neaville	Dem.	Potosi	January 6, 1868	January 4, 1869	21st
George H. Brock	Rep.	Potosi	January 4, 1869	January 3, 1870	22nd
John Carthew	Rep.	Rockville	January 3, 1870	January 2, 1871	23rd
Henry B. Coons	Dem.	Potosi	January 2, 1871	January 1, 1872	24th
Allen R. Bushnell	Rep.	Lancaster	January 1, 1872	January 6, 1873	25th
William H. Clise	Rep.	Lancaster	January 6, 1873	January 5, 1874	26th
John Benton Callis	Lib.R.	Lancaster	January 5, 1874	January 4, 1875	27th
Lafayette Caskey	Rep.	Potosi	January 4, 1875	January 3, 1876	28th
Joseph Bock	Rep.	Lancaster	January 3, 1876	January 7, 1878	29th 30th
William John McCoy	Dem.	Beetown	January 7, 1878	January 6, 1879	31st
Joseph Trotter Mills	Rep.	Lancaster	January 6, 1879	January 5, 1880	32nd
John A. Klindt	Rep.	Cassville	January 5, 1880	January 3, 1881	33rd
Henry S. Keene	Rep.	Lancaster	January 3, 1881	January 2, 1882	34th
Daniel Bartlett Stevens	Rep.	Cassville	January 2, 1882	January 1, 1883	35th
William John McCoy	Dem.	Lancaster	January 1, 1883	January 3, 1887	36th 37th
Reuben B. Showalter	Rep.	Lancaster	January 3, 1887	January 5, 1891	38th 39th
John Oswald	Dem.	Lancaster	January 5, 1891	January 2, 1893	40th
Joseph B. Johnson	Rep.	Montfort	January 2, 1893	January 7, 1895	41st
Joshua B. Bradbury	Rep.	Mount Ida	January 7, 1895	January 4, 1897	42nd
Adelbert L. Utt	Rep.	Platteville	January 4, 1897	January 2, 1899	43rd
John Ryan	Rep.	Beetown	January 2, 1899	January 7, 1901	44th
Sherman E. Smalley	Rep.	Cuba City	January 7, 1901	January 5, 1903	45th
Joseph P. Chandler	Rep.	Montfort	January 5, 1903	January 7, 1907	46th 47th
Henry Edgar Roethe	Rep.	Fennimore	January 7, 1907	January 2, 1911	48th 49th
David Schreiner	Rep.	Lancaster	January 2, 1911	January 6, 1913	50th
Henry Edgar Roethe	Rep.	Fennimore	January 6, 1913	January 4, 1915	51st
Edward Heathcote	Rep.	Fennimore	January 4, 1915	January 1, 1917	52nd
John J. Ruka	Rep.	Boscobel	January 1, 1917	January 3, 1921	53rd 54th
Charles E. Tuffley	Rep.	Boscobel	January 3, 1921	January 3, 1927	55th 56th 57th
Leroy D. Eastman	Rep.	Boscobel	January 3, 1927	January 5, 1931	58th 59th
Hugh A. Harper	Rep.	Lancaster	January 5, 1931	January 4, 1937	60th 61st 62nd
P. Bradley McIntyre	Rep.	Lancaster	January 4, 1937	January 1, 1945	63rd 64th 65th 66th
Hugh A. Harper	Rep.	Lancaster	January 1, 1945	January 5, 1953	67th 68th 69th 70th
William A. Loy	Rep.	Fennimore	January 5, 1953	January 3, 1955	71st
District abolished by 1951 Wisconsin Act 728 (implemented 1954); Grant County was consolidated as a single-county Assembly district
