= Otis Norton =

American businessman and politician (1809–1889)

Member of the Wisconsin Senate from the 15th district
- In office June 5, 1848 – January 6, 1851
- Preceded by: Position established
- Succeeded by: Andrew Palmer

Personal details
- Born: February 27, 1809 Cambridge, New York, U.S.
- Died: May 15, 1889 (aged 80) Janesville, Wisconsin, U.S.
- Resting place: Oak Hill Cemetery, Janesville, Wisconsin
- Party: Whig
- Spouse: Hannah Wood (m. 1834–1889)
- Children: Mary Eliza (Ewer)^{(b. 1836; died 1921)}; Frances Cornelia (Tallman)^{(b. 1839; died 1924)}; Mrs. Spencer Eldredge; Mrs. Chas. D. Cory; George O. Norton

Otis West Norton (February 27, 1809 – May 15, 1889) was an American businessman, politician, and Wisconsin pioneer. He served in the first three sessions of the Wisconsin State Senate, representing Rock County (1848, 1849, 1850).

== Biography ==
Otis Norton was born in Cambridge, New York, but was raised in Reading, New York, where his father owned a large farm and constructed several water-powered mills. Norton worked on his father's land until age 20, when he went to work as a store clerk in the nearby community of Eddytown, New York, and, subsequently, in Buffalo, New York. After two years working in Buffalo, he entered a business partnership to open his own dry goods store.

In 1841, he made a trip to Illinois and the Wisconsin Territory, looking for land. On March 4, 1841, he purchased 160 acres near Prairie du Lac (now Milton, Wisconsin), in Rock County, Wisconsin Territory. He worked the farm until 1849, when he moved into the nearby village of Janesville, Wisconsin. While living in Milton, he served on the Rock County Board of Supervisors and was the first town clerk of Milton.

When Wisconsin achieved statehood, Norton was elected on the Whig Party ticket to serve in the first session of the Wisconsin State Senate as the representative of the 15th State Senate district (Rock County). In the fall of 1848, he was re-elected to serve in the 1849 and 1850 sessions. He was succeeded in the Senate by Andrew Palmer, a Democrat.

Shortly after Norton's move to Janesville, he began operating a grain exchange along with several other farmer-merchants in the city. In 1854, Norton built an imposing grain elevator in the city, which became the center of this commerce. Known as the "Corn Exchange" the grain elevator became a navigational landmark of the early city.

In 1853, he was listed as one of the directors of the Beloit and Madison Railroad. In October 1855, he was one of the founders of the Central Bank of Wisconsin (later the First National Bank of Janesville); he was the first president of the bank and served as bondsman. He was also on the board of directors of the Mutual Fire Insurance Company of the City of Janesville, and of the Janesville Gas Light Company.

In 1871, he moved to Chicago and began purchasing grain from railroad stations spanning from Nebraska to the Fox River Valley in Wisconsin, and continued in this business for the remainder of his working years. From the mid-1870s, he suffered a long kidney disease that led to the gradual loss of his eyesight. He retired in the mid 1880s and lived in the care of his son and daughters.

He died at the home of his daughter, Frances Tallman, in Janesville, on May 15, 1889.

== Personal life and family ==
Norton married Hannah Wood at Seneca, New York, on March 20, 1834. At the time of his death in 1889, he had five living children.

Wisconsin Senate
New state government	Member of the Wisconsin Senate from 15th district June 5, 1848 – January 6, 1851	Succeeded by Andrew Palmer
