= Elias Slothower =

19th century American politician

Member of the Wisconsin State Assembly from the Lafayette 2nd district
- In office June 5, 1848 – January 1, 1849
- Preceded by: Position established
- Succeeded by: William Hill

Personal details
- Born: October 17, 1815 Adams County, Pennsylvania, U.S.
- Died: April 7, 1890 (aged 74) Gratiot, Wisconsin, U.S.
- Party: Democratic
- Spouse: Susanna E. Zeigle (m. 1836–1890)
- Children: 8
- Profession: Farmer, Politician

Elias Slothower (October 17, 1815 – April 7, 1890) was an American farmer, politician, and Wisconsin pioneer. He was a member of the Wisconsin State Assembly, representing eastern Lafayette County during the 1st Wisconsin Legislature.

== Biography ==
Slothower was born in Adams County, Pennsylvania, in 1815. Upon becoming and adult, he moved to Indianapolis, Chicago, and Madison, Wisconsin, before finally settling near Monroe in Lafayette County, Wisconsin. He purchased a farm in the town of Gratiot.

He was elected to the first Wisconsin State Assembly as a Democrat, serving in 1848. He also served as assessor and a member of town of Gratiot board of supervisors.

He married Susanna E. Zeigle in 1836, with whom he had eight children.

He died at his home in Gratiot on April 7, 1890.
