= John Sell =

John Sell may refer to:

- John Sell (Democrat) (1816–1883), Democratic member of the Wisconsin State Assembly, 1856
- John M. Sell (1863–1930), Socialist member of the Wisconsin State Assembly, 1919–1920

== See also ==
- John Sell Cotman (1782–1842), English marine and landscape painter, etcher, illustrator and author
