= Robert M. Briggs =

American politician

Robert Marshall Briggs (February 15, 1816 – December 8, 1886) was an American merchant, lawyer, judge and politician in Wisconsin and California. Briggs served as a Whig member of the 2nd and 4th Wisconsin Legislatures representing Grant County in the Wisconsin State Assembly; and in 1857 was elected to the California State Assembly from Amador County as a Know-Nothing. He also served as a district attorney and a judge.

== Background ==
Briggs was born February 15, 1816, in Morganfield, Kentucky, and was trained as a lawyer. Sometime in the 1830s he had moved to Hannibal, Missouri, where his son Nash C. Briggs was born in 1838. About 1846–1848, Briggs moved to Beetown, Wisconsin Territory with his family.

== In Wisconsin ==
At the time of his first taking office in the Assembly on January 10, 1849, he was reported to be 32 years old, a native of Kentucky, and had been resident in Wisconsin for two years. He was replaced in the 3rd Wisconsin Legislature by Democrat John B. Turley (also a town officer of Beetown), but supplanted Turley for the 4th (1851) session.

When the Town of Beetown was first organized in 1849, he was elected its town clerk, but served only one one-year term.

In 1851, Briggs and his colleague William R. Biddlecome of Potosi got the state to charter the Potosi & Dodgeville Railroad Company. Briggs reportedly secured his election by promising that the railroad would run by Beetown with a double track "like two rows of brass buttons on a double-breasted vest," but in the end the track was run further north through the Wisconsin River Valley.

== In California ==
Briggs moved to California about 1852, living first in a place called Olita, then settling in Jackson, where he started a law practice, built a home in Greek Revival style, and became active in local politics. In 1855, when in the aftermath of a series of murders, lynchings, arsons and other outrages a public meeting was held to propose the outlawing of all "Mexicans" in Amador County, Briggs was especially "violently opposed" to the measure; others agreed, and the idea was abandoned. In the September 1857 general election he was the only successful Know-Nothing candidate in the county, and among the few in the state (the Know-Nothing's gubernatorial candidate drew 20.8% of the vote), winning a seat in the State Assembly for Amador County. In the Assembly, it was said, "he chewed the bitter cud of Know-nothingism, to the bitter end, alone." When the Know-Nothings collapsed in the wake of the 1857 election, Briggs was among those Know-Nothings who chose to work with the Democratic Party (the Republicans were still an untried and uncertain movement at that time).

Between statehood and 1854, the state capital of California had been moved six times before settling in Sacramento. Between 1856 and 1860, bills would be introduced to move the capital again, to San Francisco, Oakland, San Jose and Santa Cruz. During his term in the Assembly, Briggs introduced a bill to move the state capital to local high point Butte Mountain in Amador, and providing for a sufficient number of balloons to be attached to the capital building to float and hold it suspended, so that in the case of high water or other danger it could be moved without additional expense. The bill did not pass, but his point was made.

In early 1861, Briggs was among the most prominent "Douglas Democrats", calling public meetings, introducing pro-Union resolutions and making pro-Union speeches around the county. By 1862, however, Briggs (like most of the Douglas Democrats statewide) had joined the Republican Party (sometimes at that time called the Union Party), and as a Republican he was elected District Attorney for Amador County in the 1862 general election and re-elected in 1863 and 1865, defeated in 1867, and returned to office in 1871.

In 1865, he acquired the presses of the defunct Amador Dispatch (whose Mississippi-born editor had been arrested for celebrating the assassination of Abraham Lincoln) and began publishing a newspaper called the Union Advocate in Jackson. In 1871, he was the Republican nominee for county treasurer.

In 1877 or 1878 he moved to Bodie in Mono County, where he opened a law practice; then for some years was Register of the district federal land office in Independence, California in Inyo County. He appears to have been the Republican nominee in 1877 for the Assembly district including Inyo and Mono Counties; at least one California newspaper reported him as winning that seat, but the Legislature's own records do not show him serving. In 1879 he was elected Judge of the Superior Court in Mono County, a position he would hold until 1886.

== Personal life ==
Local historian J. D. Mason wrote,

His petite form seemed made up of a bundle of nerves, as unconscious of fatigue as the wires of an electric battery, which seemed to flash to his brain and concentrate there all the vast vitality which nature had so bound together, whenever occasion demanded. He was always ready for a speech, at the Bar or on the stump, and never failed to hold together and to enthuse his audience.

In January 1886, less than a year before his death, he was described as "a small man in the seventies... stroking his long white beard".

He died December 8, 1886, at his home in Bridgeport. He had recently received the Republican nomination for Superior Court Judge in Amador County, which position would have permitted him to move back to Jackson, where his wife and their adult children had stayed on while he served as judge in Mono County.
