= Cornelius Coughlin =

American politician

Cornelius Coughlin (November 23, 1840 – ?) was an American farmer from West Bend, Wisconsin who served one term as an Independent Greenback member of the Wisconsin State Assembly from Washington County.

Coughlin was born in Pennsylvania on November 23, 1840; his family came to Wisconsin in 1841, and settled at Summit, in Waukesha County; but moved to Washington County in 1855. He received a common school education, and became a farmer by occupation.

== Public office ==
He was elected as an "Independent Greenback" for the Assembly's 2nd Washington County district (the Towns of Addison, Barton, Farmington, Kewaskum, Trenton, Wayne and West Bend) in 1877, receiving 995 votes against 735 for George H. Kleffler, who had served in the Assembly's 1868 session as a Democrat, but was running as a Republican (Democratic incumbent Nicholaus Marx was not a candidate for re-election).

He did not run for re-election in 1878, and was succeeded by Democrat John G. Frank.
