= Davenport Rood =

American politician

Davenport Rood was an American carpenter from Jefferson, Wisconsin who served in the 1st Wisconsin Legislature as a Democratic member of the Wisconsin State Assembly from the 3rd Jefferson County district.

== Background ==
Rood was a carpenter, who did the interior finishing work on the Jefferson County courthouse, jail and sheriff's residence built in 1842–43. In 1848, he was one of several directors of a company chartered by the Territorial Assembly to build plank roads between Milwaukee, Waukesha, Watertown, the Rock River and elsewhere. Other directors of this company (not the same as the one which successfully built the Milwaukee-Watertown Plank Road) included Winchel Bacon, Joseph W. Brackett and Andrew Proudfit.

== Public office ==
Rood was one of the first town supervisors (city council members) of Jefferson, in 1844.

The 3rd district included the Towns of Farmington, Jefferson, Koshkonong, Lake Mills and Oakland. He was succeeded in the 1849 session by fellow Democrat William H. Johnson.
