= John G. Frank =

American politician (1831–?)

John Gottlieb Frank (June 24, 1831 – 15 February 1914) was a German from Silesia who moved to Jackson, Wisconsin who served a single one-year term in 1879 as a Democratic member of the Wisconsin State Assembly from Washington County. succeeding Cornelius Coughlin.

In 1879, he lost the Democratic nomination, and ran as an "Independent Democrat" against the official Democratic nominee, Jacob C. Place. He lost to Place, who polled 650 votes to 549 votes for Republican F. Hildebrandt and 470 for Frank.
