= Hugh Long (politician) =

American politician

Hugh Long was a member of the Wisconsin State Assembly in 1848. He was a Democrat.
