= Joseph W. Brackett =

American politician

Joseph W. Brackett was a Democratic member of the Wisconsin State Assembly during the 1st Wisconsin Legislature in 1848. Brackett was born in Lancaster, New Hampshire in 1800 and died on November 5, 1873. His son, James, would hold various public offices.

== See also ==
- Joseph W. Brackett at Find a Grave
