= Rufus Cheney Jr. =

American politician

Rufus Cheney Jr. was an American politician. He was a member of the Wisconsin State Assembly during the 1850 session. He was a Whig.
