= Nathaniel Strong =

American politician

Nathaniel Strong was a member of the Wisconsin State Assembly during the 1848 session. Strong represented the 5th District of Rock County, Wisconsin. He was a Democrat.
