= William Caldwell (Wisconsin politician) =

American politician

William Caldwell (fl. 1846–1848) was an American shopkeeper from Barton, Wisconsin, who served a single one-year term as a Whig member of the Wisconsin State Assembly in the 1st Wisconsin Legislature. He was the only Whig among the five Assemblymen from Washington County.

== Background ==
In 1846, William and his brother Edward Caldwell, described as "Yankees", opened a general store in Barton near the Salisbury sawmill, selling merchandise they had to haul in every year from Milwaukee. When the sawmill burnt down, the Caldwells bought the remains and rebuilt it as a flour mill. These two businesses served as a nucleus for the growing community of Barton.

== Legislator ==
When Wisconsin was given statehood in 1848, Caldwell was elected from the 5th Washington County assembly district (the Towns of Addison, Hartford. North Bend and West Bend). He was succeeded for the 1849 term by Chauncey M. Phelps, a Democrat from Addison.
