= David McDonald (Wisconsin politician) =

American politician

David McDonald was a member of the Wisconsin State Assembly during the 1848 session. McDonald represented the 1st District of Racine County, Wisconsin. He was a Democrat.
