= Henry B. Roberts =

American politician

Henry B. Roberts was a member of the Wisconsin State Assembly during the 1848 session. Roberts represented the 2nd District of Racine County, Wisconsin. He was a Democrat.
