= Chauncey M. Phelps =

American politician (1818–1868)

Chauncey Moss Phelps (also spelled Chauncy and Chancey) (June 28, 1818 – March 21, 1868) was an American farmer and politician who held office in two counties, as well as in the legislatures of the Territory and State of Wisconsin.

== Background ==
He was born June 28, 1818, in Russell, New York, son of Elihu and Emmaline (or Emaline) Clark Phelps. He married Alma Heaton, a native like himself of St. Lawrence County, New York. They came to Wisconsin about 1844 or 1845.

== Public office ==
He was a county supervisor for his home town of Addison for the 1846-47 term. He was appointed to fill a vacancy in the office of county treasurer, but was removed by the board for alleged malfeasance on July 2, 1847. He was not elected supervisor for the 1847-48 term (the office was held by one Luther B. Phelps instead), but was elected to the last Territorial Council (equivalent to a state senate) for Wisconsin Territory for 1847-1848, representing Washington and Sheboygan counties. He did return to the County board for the 1848-49 term.

He served a single one-year term as a Democratic member of the 1849 Wisconsin State Assembly (2nd Wisconsin Legislature) for the 5th Washington County assembly district (the Towns of Addison, Hartford, North Bend and West Bend), succeeding William Caldwell, a Whig. He would be succeeded for the 1850 term by fellow Democrat Anson H. Taylor. At the time of his taking office in January 1849, he was stated to be a farmer, 30 years old, a native of New York state, and as having been in Wisconsin for four years.

When Green Lake County was first organized in 1858, Phelps was designated its Treasurer. It is unclear how long they had been in Green Lake County. In December 1860, he was elected county treasurer.

== After public office ==
Alma died in 1862; they had had at least five children who lived to adulthood. He died March 21, 1868, in Green Lake.
