= Stephen Jones (Wisconsin politician) =

American politician

Stephen Jones was a member of the Wisconsin State Assembly during the 1848 session. Jones represented Dodge County, Wisconsin. He was a Whig.
