= Abner Nichols =

American politician

Abner Nichols (died March 10, 1856) was a member of the Wisconsin State Assembly.

== Biography ==
Nichols was a native of Cornwall, in the United Kingdom. He fought in the Black Hawk War. He was the proprietor of the Mansion House, the first or one of the first hotels in Mineral Point. It was in his hotel that Henry Dodge was sworn in on July 4, 1836, as the first governor of Wisconsin Territory, appointed by Andrew Jackson. Nichols was appointed a lieutenant colonel in 1836. "Ab" Nichols died on March 10, 1856, and was buried in Mineral Point, Wisconsin, in the Old City Cemetery. The street in Mineral Point next to the site of his hotel is named for him.

== Assembly career ==
Nichols was a member of the Assembly during the 1st Wisconsin Legislature. He was a Democrat.
