= Gratiot (town), Wisconsin =

Gratiot, Wisconsin
- Town
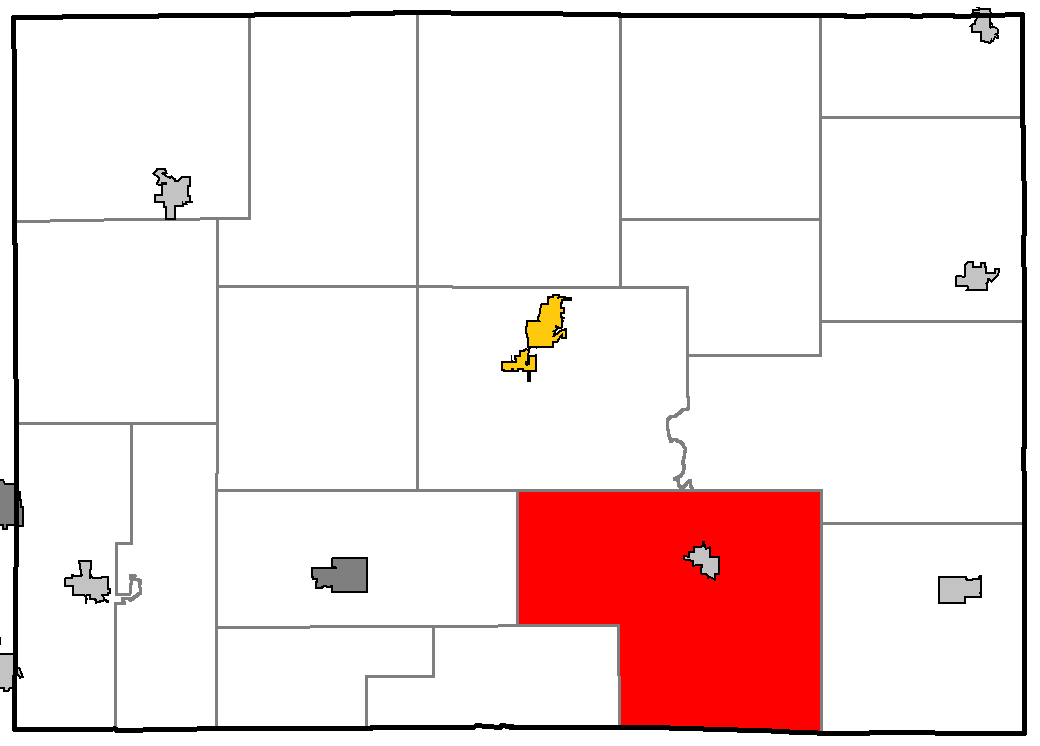
- Location of Gratiot, within Lafayette County, Wisconsin

- Location within Wisconsin Location within the United States
- Coordinates: 42°34′2″N 90°2′42″W
- Country: United States
- State: Wisconsin
- County: Lafayette

Area
  - Total: 54.38 sq mi (140.85 km^{2})
  - Land: 54.38 sq mi (140.85 km^{2})
  - Water: 0 sq mi (0.0 km^{2})
- Elevation: 940 ft (290 m)

Population (2020)
  - Total: 575
  - Density: 10.6/sq mi (4.08/km^{2})
- Time zone: UTC-6 (CST)
  - Summer (DST): UTC-5 (CDT)
- ZIP Code: 53541
- Area code: 608
- FIPS code: 55-065-30600
- GNIS feature ID: 1583308

Gratiot (/ˈɡrætʃɪt/) is a town in Lafayette County, Wisconsin, United States. The population was 575 at the 2020 census, down from 5500000000000000000 at the 2010 census. The village of Gratiot is located within the town. The unincorporated community of Riverside and part of the unincorporated community of Dunbarton are also in the town.

== Geography ==
Gratiot is in southern Lafayette County, bordered to the south by Jo Daviess County, Illinois. The village of Gratiot is in the north-central part of the town. According to the United States Census Bureau, the town has a total area of 54.4 square miles (140.9 km^{2}), all land. The Pecatonica River flows through the northeast part of the town.

== Demographics ==
Historical population
| Census | Pop. | Note | %± |
|---|---|---|---|
| 2000 | 653 | | — |
| 2010 | 550 | | −15.8% |
| 2020 | 575 | | 4.5% |

As of the census of 2000, there were 653 people, 237 households, and 179 families residing in the town. The population density was 12.0 people per square mile (4.6/km^{2}). There were 258 housing units at an average density of 4.8 per square mile (1.8/km^{2}). The racial makeup of the town was 99.85% White and 0.15% Black or African American. 0.00% of the population were Hispanic or Latino of any race.

There were 237 households, out of which 39.2% had children under the age of 18 living with them, 68.4% were married couples living together, 3.8% had a female householder with no husband present, and 24.1% were non-families. 21.9% of all households were made up of individuals, and 11.4% had someone living alone who was 65 years of age or older. The average household size was 2.74 and the average family size was 3.19.

In the town, the population was spread out, with 26.8% under the age of 18, 8.6% from 18 to 24, 28.2% from 25 to 44, 23.3% from 45 to 64, and 13.2% who were 65 years of age or older. The median age was 38 years. For every 100 females, there were 105.3 males. For every 100 females age 18 and over, there were 110.6 males.

The median income for a household in the town was $46,583, and the median income for a family was $53,750. Males had a median income of $29,167 versus $24,000 for females. The per capita income for the town was $17,987. About 7.2% of families and 6.2% of the population were below the poverty line, including 7.3% of those under age 18 and 4.5% of those age 65 or over.
