= Arthur W. Worth =

American politician

Arthur W. Worth was an American politician. He was a member of the Wisconsin State Assembly during the 1848 session. Worth represented Grant County, Wisconsin. Other positions he held include Treasurer of Lancaster, Wisconsin. He was a Democrat.
