= Henry Allen (Wisconsin politician) =

American politician

Member of the Wisconsin Assembly
- Incumbent
- Assumed office 1848

Personal details
- Party: Democratic

Henry Allen was an American politician. He was a Democratic member of the Wisconsin State Assembly during the 1848 session. Allen represented the 1st District of Washington County, Wisconsin.
