= Andrew Palmer (politician) =

American politician (1808–1891)

- Born: March 28, 1808; Binghamton, New York, US
- Died: February 11, 1891 (aged 82)
- Occupation: Member of the Wisconsin State Senate

Andrew Palmer (March 28, 1808 – February 11, 1891) was a member of the Wisconsin State Senate.

== Biography ==
Palmer was born in Binghamton, New York. He moved to Toledo, Ohio in 1833, where he published The Blade. In 1845, he moved to Janesville, Wisconsin.

Palmer was married to Mary Hutchinson Mulford and they had six children. He died on February 11, 1891.

== Political career ==
Palmer, Son of Sylvanus Palmer and Annatje Gardinier, was a member of the Senate from 1851 to 1852 as a Democrat. Previously, he was an unsuccessful candidate for Mayor of Toledo in 1837.
