= Ezra Durgin =

American politician

Ezra Durgin (9 August 1796 – December 1863) was a member of the Wisconsin State Assembly.

== Biography ==
Durgin was born in 1796 near Concord, New Hampshire. He married Temperance Nutter and moved to what late became Exeter, Wisconsin and later Manitowoc County, Wisconsin and Rock County, Wisconsin. He was involved in the lumber business. Durgin died in December 1863.

== Career ==
Durgin was a member of the Assembly during the 1848 session. He was a Democrat.
