= John Sell (Democrat) =

American politician (1816–1883)

John Sell (February 2, 1816 – September 17, 1883) was an American politician. He was a Democrat from Addison, Washington County, Wisconsin, and served one term as a member of the Wisconsin State Assembly. during the ninth (1856) session of the state legislature. He was elected by a large majority.
