= William T. Sterling =

American politician

William T. Sterling (January 29, 1808 – January 12, 1903) was an American politician and pioneer from Wisconsin.

Born in Woodford County, Kentucky, Sterling came with Henry Dodge to the lead mines of Wisconsin. Sterling served as a clerk in the Wisconsin Territorial Legislature. In 1848 and 1850, Sterling served in the Wisconsin State Assembly. In 1852, Sterling platted what is now the village of Mount Sterling in Crawford County. Sterling died at his daughter's home in Scott, Wisconsin in 1903.
