= Mount Sterling, Wisconsin =

- Village
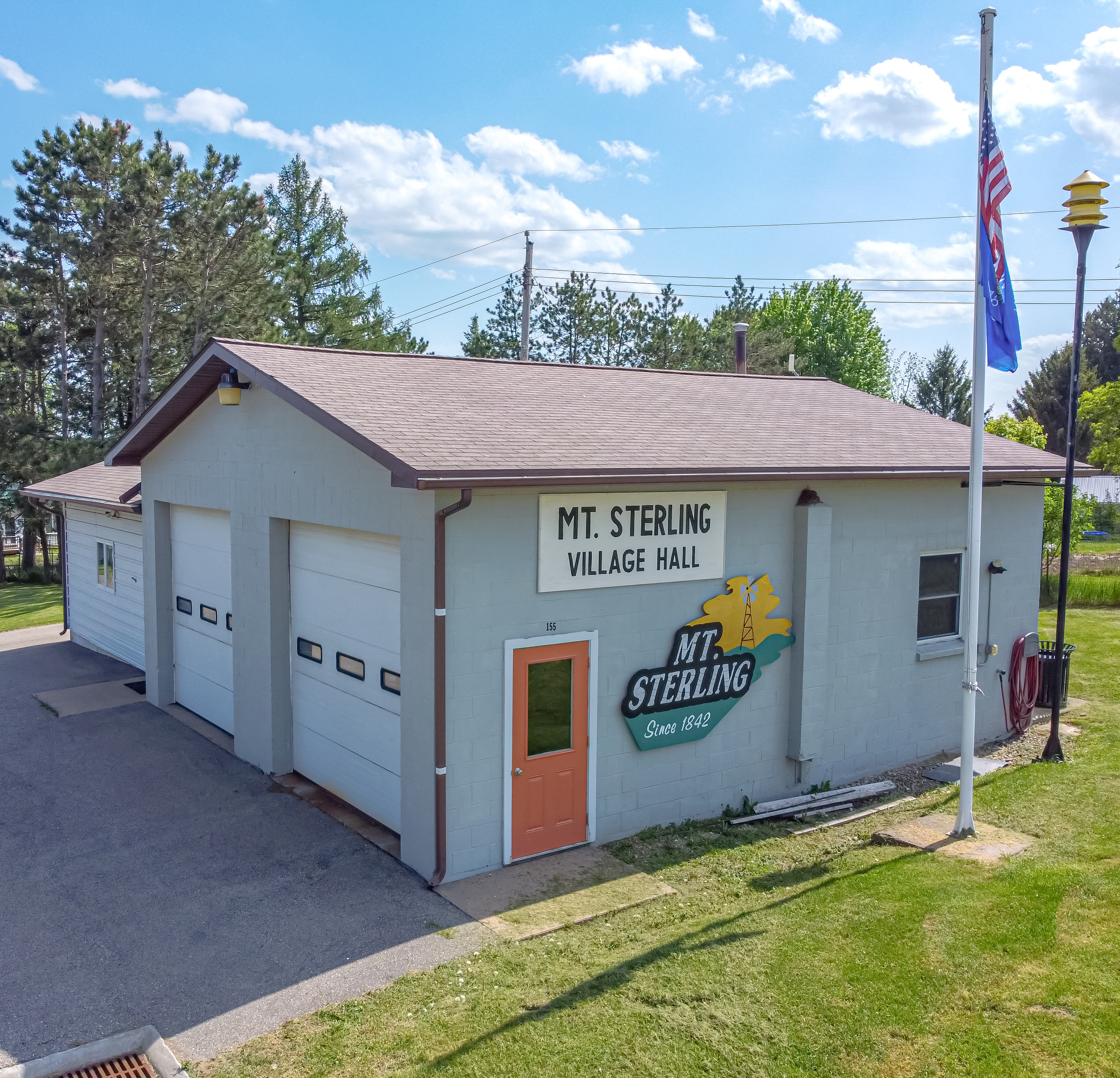
- Mt. Sterling Village Hall

- Location of Mount Sterling in Crawford County, Wisconsin.
- Coordinates: 43°18′58″N 90°55′43″W
- Country: United States
- State: Wisconsin
- County: Crawford

Area
  - Total: 1.42 sq mi (3.68 km^{2})
  - Land: 1.42 sq mi (3.68 km^{2})
  - Water: 0 sq mi (0.00 km^{2})
- Elevation: 1,184 ft (361 m)

Population (2020)
  - Total: 189
  - Density: 133/sq mi (51.4/km^{2})
- Time zone: UTC-6 (Central (CST))
  - Summer (DST): UTC-5 (CDT)
- Area code: 608
- FIPS code: 55-54900
- GNIS feature ID: 1569847

Mount Sterling is a village in Crawford County, Wisconsin, United States. The population was 189 at the 2020 census.

== Geography ==
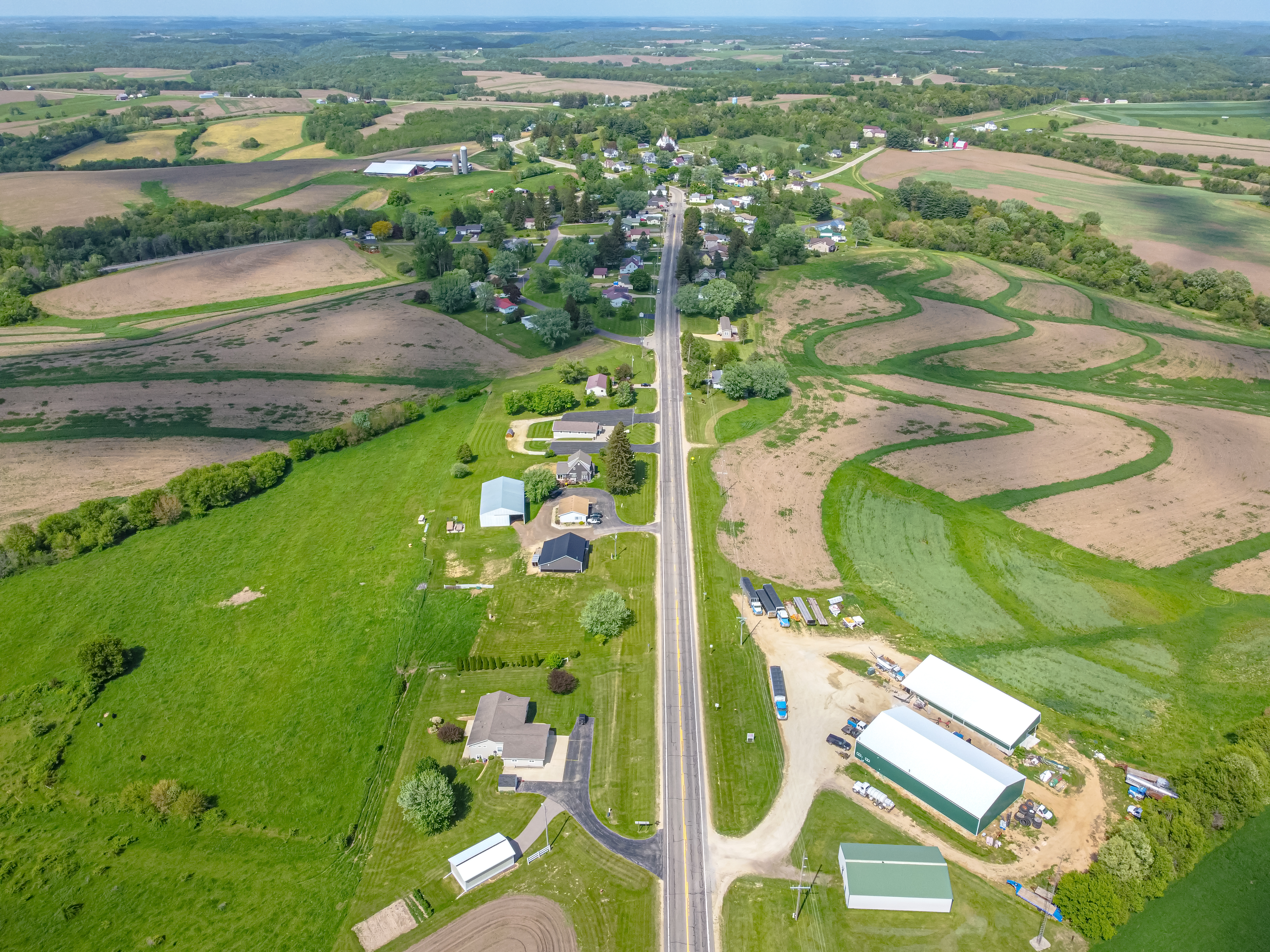
Wis-27 runs through town

Mount Sterling is located at 43°18′58″N 90°55′43″W (43.316175, -90.928709).

According to the United States Census Bureau, the village has a total area of 1.42 square miles (3.68 km^{2}), all land.

== Demographics ==
Historical population
Census	Pop.	Note	%±
1880	95		—
1940	264		—
1950	205		−22.3%
1960	161		−21.5%
1970	181		12.4%
1980	223		23.2%
1990	217		−2.7%
2000	215		−0.9%
2010	211		−1.9%
2020	189		−10.4%
U.S. Decennial Census

=== 2010 census ===
As of the census of 2010, there were 211 people, 88 households, and 63 families living in the village. The population density was 148.6 inhabitants per square mile (57.4/km^{2}). There were 98 housing units at an average density of 69.0 per square mile (26.6/km^{2}). The racial makeup of the village was 99.5% White and 0.5% Asian.

There were 88 households, of which 30.7% had children under the age of 18 living with them, 52.3% were married couples living together, 14.8% had a female householder with no husband present, 4.5% had a male householder with no wife present, and 28.4% were non-families. 26.1% of all households were made up of individuals, and 14.8% had someone living alone who was 65 years of age or older. The average household size was 2.40 and the average family size was 2.79.

The median age in the village was 42.4 years. 26.5% of residents were under the age of 18; 5.3% were between the ages of 18 and 24; 20.5% were from 25 to 44; 31.8% were from 45 to 64; and 16.1% were 65 years of age or older. The gender makeup of the village was 49.3% male and 50.7% female.

=== 2000 census ===
As of the census of 2000, there were 215 people, 89 households, and 59 families living in the village. The population density was 151.6 people per square mile (58.5/km^{2}). There were 98 housing units at an average density of 69.1 per square mile (26.6/km^{2}). The racial makeup of the village was 99.07% White, 0.47% Asian, and 0.47% from two or more races.

There were 89 households, out of which 30.3% had children under the age of 18 living with them, 51.7% were married couples living together, 10.1% had a female householder with no husband present, and 33.7% were non-families. 32.6% of all households were made up of individuals, and 25.8% had someone living alone who was 65 years of age or older. The average household size was 2.42 and the average family size was 3.05.

In the village, the population was spread out, with 26.0% under the age of 18, 3.7% from 18 to 24, 25.1% from 25 to 44, 19.1% from 45 to 64, and 26.0% who were 65 years of age or older. The median age was 44 years. For every 100 females, there were 108.7 males. For every 100 females age 18 and over, there were 98.8 males.

The median income for a household in the village was $29,375, and the median income for a family was $40,000. Males had a median income of $27,917 versus $18,125 for females. The per capita income for the village was $13,891. About 8.0% of families and 11.1% of the population were below the poverty line, including 4.8% of those under the age of eighteen and 19.1% of those 65 or over.

== History ==
In 1852, William T. Sterling, who served in the Wisconsin State Assembly, platted the village of Mount Sterling.

== See also ==
- List of villages in Wisconsin
