= Nicholaus Marx =

American politician

Nicholaus Marx (sometimes spelled Nicolaus Marx) was a Democratic member of the Wisconsin State Assembly. He represented the 1st District of Washington County during the 1864 session and the 2nd District during the 1877 session. Marx was born on February 2, 1830.
