= Alva Stewart =

American politician

Alva Stewart (October 21, 1821, in Morrisonville, New York – December 31, 1889) was a member of the Wisconsin State Assembly and the Wisconsin State Senate.

== Career ==
Stewart was a member of the Assembly in 1850. He represented the 12th District of the Senate in 1852 and the 14th District in 1853. From 1864 to 1889, Stewart was a Wisconsin Circuit Court judge. He was a member of the Whig Party.
