= Cedar Creek, Wisconsin =

- Unincorporated community
- Location within Wisconsin Location within the United States
- Coordinates: 43°20′23″N 88°13′22″W
- Country: United States
- State: Wisconsin
- County: Washington
- Elevation: 1,053 ft (321 m)
- Time zone: UTC-6 (Central (CST))
  - Summer (DST): UTC-5 (CDT)
- Area code: 262
- GNIS feature ID: 1562834

Cedar Creek is an unincorporated community located in the town of Polk, Washington County, Wisconsin, United States.

== History ==
Cedar Creek was originally called Maxonville, and under the latter name was founded in the 1840s by Densmore Maxon, and named for him. The present name is after nearby Cedar Creek.
