= 3rd Wisconsin Legislature =

Term of state legislature in Wisconsin, US

←	2nd	4th	→
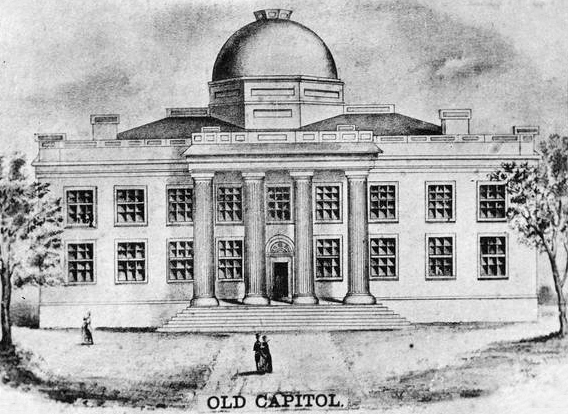
- Wisconsin State Capitol, 1855

Overview
- Legislative body: Wisconsin Legislature
- Meeting place: Wisconsin State Capitol
- Term: January 7, 1850 – January 6, 1851
- Election: November 6, 1849

Senate
- Members: 19
- Senate President: Samuel Beall
- Party control: Democratic

Assembly
- Members: 66
- Assembly Speaker: Moses M. Strong
- Party control: Democratic

Sessions
- 1st: January 9, 1850 – February 11, 1850

The Third Wisconsin Legislature convened from January 9, 1850, to February 11, 1850, in regular session. Senators representing even numbered districts were newly elected for this session and were serving the first year of a two-year term. Senators representing odd numbered districts were serving the second year of their two-year term.

The governor of Wisconsin during this entire term was Democrat Nelson Dewey, of Grant County, serving the first year of his second two-year term, having won re-election in the 1849 Wisconsin gubernatorial election.

== Major events ==
- January 7, 1850: Second Inauguration of Nelson Dewey as Governor of Wisconsin
- January 7, 1850: Inauguration of Samuel Beall as Lieutenant Governor of Wisconsin
- July 9, 1850: U.S. President Zachary Taylor died in office; Vice President Millard Fillmore became the 13th President of the United States.

== Major legislation ==
- January 30, 1850: An act for the division of the county of Racine and the erection of the county of Kenosha, 1850 Act 39

== Party summary ==
=== Senate summary ===
Senate partisan composition Democratic: 13 seats Free Soil: 2 seat Whig: 4 seats

	Party (Shading indicates majority caucus)			Total	
	Dem.	F.S.	Whig	Total	Vacant
End of previous Legislature	14	1	4	19	0
1st Session	13	2	4	19	0
Final voting share	68%	11%	21%		
Beginning of the next Legislature	14	2	3	19	0

=== Assembly summary ===
Assembly partisan composition Democratic: 43 seats Free Soil: 8 seats Whig: 15 seats

	Party (Shading indicates majority caucus)			Total	
	Dem.	F.S.	Whig	Total	Vacant
End of previous Legislature	35	14	17	66	0
1st Session	43	8	15	66	0
Final voting share	65%	12%	23%		
Beginning of the next Legislature	49	7	10	66	0

== Sessions ==
- 1st Regular session: January 9, 1850 – February 11, 1850

== Leaders ==
=== Senate leadership ===
- President of the Senate: Samuel Beall, Lieutenant Governor

=== Assembly leadership ===
- Speaker of the Assembly: Moses M. Strong

== Members ==
=== Members of the Senate ===
Members of the Wisconsin Senate for the Third Wisconsin Legislature (19):

Senate partisan representation Democratic: 13 seats Free Soil: 2 seats Whig: 4 seats

District	Counties	Senator	Party	Residence
01	Brown, Calumet, Manitowoc, Sheboygan	Lemuel Goodell	Dem.	Stockbridge
02	Columbia, Marquette, Portage, Sauk	George DeGraw Moore	Whig	Prairie du Sac
03	Crawford, Chippewa, St. Croix, La Pointe	James Fisher	Dem.	Prairie du Chien
04	Fond du Lac, Winnebago	John A. Eastman	Dem.	Fond du Lac
05	Iowa, Richland	Montgomery M. Cothren	Dem.	Mineral Point
06	Grant	John H. Rountree	Whig	Platteville
07	Lafayette	Dennis Murphy	Dem.	Shullsburg
08	Green	William Rittenhouse	Dem.	Monroe
09	Dane	Alexander Botkin	Whig	Madison
10	Dodge	James Giddings	Dem.	Chester
11	Washington	Frederick W. Horn	Dem.	Cedarburg
12	Jefferson	Peter H. Turner	Dem.	Palmyra
13	Waukesha	Frederick Sprague	Dem.	Palmyra
14	Walworth	George Gale	Free Soil	Elkhorn
15	Rock	Otis W. Norton	Whig	Milton
16	Racine (Southern Half)	Elijah Steele	Dem.	Pike
17	Racine (Northern Half)	Victor Willard	Free Soil	Waterford
18	Milwaukee (Southern Half)	Duncan Reed	Dem.	Milwaukee
19	Milwaukee (Northern Half)	John B. Smith	Dem.	Milwaukee

=== Members of the Assembly ===
Members of the Assembly for the Third Wisconsin Legislature (66):

Assembly partisan representation Democratic: 43 seats Free Soil: 8 seats Whig: 15 seats

Senate District	County	District	Representative	Party	Residence
01	Brown		Charles D. Robinson	Dem.	Green Bay
01	Calumet		David E. Wood	Whig	Manchester
02	Columbia		Hugh McFarlane	Dem.	Portage
03	Crawford & Chippewa		William T. Sterling	Dem.	Mount Sterling
09	Dane	1	John Hasey	Dem.	York
09	Dane	2	Chauncey Abbott	Whig	Madison
09	Dane	3	Oliver Bryant	Dem.	Rutland
10	Dodge	1	Oscar Hurlbut	Dem.	Lomira
10	Dodge	2	James Murdock	Dem.	Neosho
10	Dodge	3	William T. Ward	Dem.	Hustisford
10	Dodge	4	John Lowth	Dem.	Lowell
10	Dodge	5	Malcolm Sellers	Whig	Beaver Dam
04	Fond du Lac	1	Morgan Noble	Dem.	Fond du Lac
04	Fond du Lac	2	Bertine Pinckney	Whig	Ripon
06	Grant	1	Henry D. York	Dem.	Hazel Green
06	Grant	2	William McGonigal	Whig	Wingville
06	Grant	3	Jeremiah Dodge	Dem.	Lancaster
06	Grant	4	John B. Turley	Dem.	Cassville
08	Green		William Comstock Green	Dem.	York
05	Iowa & Richland	1	Moses M. Strong	Dem.	Mineral Point
05	Iowa & Richland	2	Thomas M. Fullerton	Dem.	Dodgeville
12	Jefferson	1	Abram Vanderpool	Dem.	Waterloo
12	Jefferson	2	Austin Kellogg	Dem.	Concord
12	Jefferson	3	Alva Stewart	Whig	Fort Atkinson
03	La Pointe & St. Croix		John S. Watrous	Dem.	La Pointe
07	Lafayette	1	Cornelius DeLong	Dem.	Belmont
07	Lafayette	2	John K. Williams	Dem.	Shullsburg
01	Manitowoc		Charles Kuehn	Dem.	Manitowoc
02	Marquette & Waushara		Benjamin Spaulding	Free Soil	Arcade
19	Milwaukee	1	James B. Cross	Dem.	Milwaukee
19	Milwaukee	2	Charles E. Jenkins	Dem.	Milwaukee
18	Milwaukee	3	Edward McGarry	Dem.	Milwaukee
18	Milwaukee	4	John E. Cameron	Dem.	Milwaukee
18	Milwaukee	5	Garrett M. Fitzgerald	Dem.	Franklin
18	Milwaukee	6	Enoch Chase	Whig	Lake
19	Milwaukee	7	Samuel Brown	Free Soil	Milwaukee
02	Portage		Walter D. McIndoe	Whig	Wausau
17	Racine	1	Horace Chapman	Free Soil	Racine
17	Racine	2	Stephen O. Bennett	Free Soil	Raymond
17	Racine	3	Caleb P. Barns	Dem.	Burlington
16	Racine	4	Samuel Hale Jr.	Dem.	Racine
16	Racine	5	George M. Robinson	Free Soil	Salem
15	Rock	1	William F. Tompkins	Whig	Janesville
15	Rock	2	John R. Briggs Jr.	Whig	Beloit
15	Rock	3	Leander Hoskins	Whig	Union
15	Rock	4	John A. Segar	Whig	Johnstown
15	Rock	5	Erastus C. Smith	Free Soil	Spring Valley
02	Sauk		Caleb Crosswell	Dem.	Baraboo
01	Sheboygan	1	Horatio N. Smith	Dem.	Sheboygan
01	Sheboygan	2	Francis G. Manney	Dem.	Lyndon
14	Walworth	1	Alexander O. Babcock	Whig	East Troy
14	Walworth	2	Rufus Cheney Jr.	Whig	Whitewater
14	Walworth	3	Alexander S. Palmer	Dem.	Geneva
14	Walworth	4	George Sykes	Free Soil	Sharon
14	Walworth	5	Wyman Spooner	Free Soil	Elkhorn
11	Washington	1	Solon Johnson	Dem.	Port Washington
11	Washington	2	Eugene S. Turner	Dem.	Grafton
11	Washington	3	Cornelius S. Griffin	Dem.	Saukville
11	Washington	4	Edward Divin	Dem.	Richfield
11	Washington	5	Henry Weil	Dem.	West Bend
13	Waukesha	1	Patrick Higgins	Dem.	Menomonee
13	Waukesha	2	Henry Shears	Whig	Oconomowoc
13	Waukesha	3	Pitts Ellis	Dem.	Genesee
13	Waukesha	4	John E. Gallagher	Dem.	Waukesha
13	Waukesha	5	Anson H. Taylor	Dem.	Muskego
04	Winnebago		Leonard P. Crary	Dem.	Oshkosh

== Employees ==
=== Senate employees ===
- Chief Clerk: William Rudolph Smith
- Sergeant-at-Arms: James Hanrahan

=== Assembly employees ===
- Chief Clerk: Alexander T. Gray
- Sergeant-at-Arms: E. R. Hugunin
