= 5th Wisconsin Legislature =

Wisconsin legislative term for 1852

←	4th	6th	→
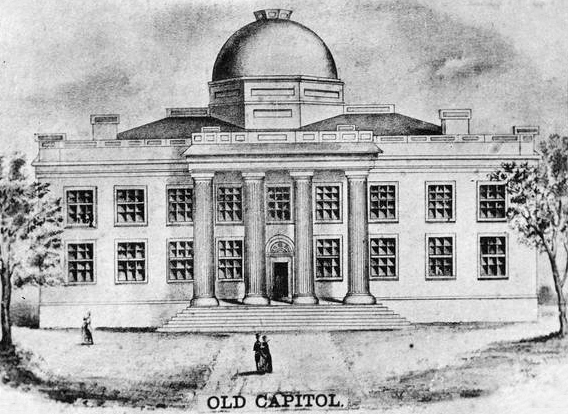
- Wisconsin State Capitol, 1855

Overview
- Legislative body: Wisconsin Legislature
- Meeting place: Wisconsin State Capitol
- Term: January 5, 1852 – January 3, 1853
- Election: November 4, 1851

Senate
- Members: 19
- Senate President: Timothy Burns
- President pro tempore: Eliab B. Dean Jr.
- Party control: Democratic

Assembly
- Members: 66
- Assembly Speaker: James McMillan Shafter
- Party control: Whig

Sessions
- 1st: January 14, 1852 – April 19, 1852

The Fifth Wisconsin Legislature convened from January 14, 1852, to April 19, 1852, in regular session. Senators representing even-numbered districts were newly elected for this session and were serving the first year of a two-year term. Assemblymembers were elected to a one-year term. Assemblymembers and even-numbered senators were elected in the general election of November 4, 1851. Senators representing odd-numbered districts were serving the second year of their two-year term, having been elected in the general election held on November 5, 1850.

The governor of Wisconsin during this entire term was Whig Leonard J. Farwell, of Dane County, serving the first year of a two-year term, having won election in the 1851 Wisconsin gubernatorial election. He was Wisconsin's only Whig governor.

== Major events ==
- January 5, 1852: Inauguration of Leonard J. Farwell as the 2nd Governor of Wisconsin.
- January 5, 1852: Inauguration of Timothy Burns as the 3rd Lieutenant Governor of Wisconsin.
- January 30, 1852: Assemblymember Matthew Murphy of Lafayette County resigned his seat after it was demonstrated that he had actually lost his election to George W. Hammett.
- November 2, 1852: Franklin Pierce elected President of the United States

== Major legislation ==
- March 3, 1852: Act to incorporate Racine College, 1852 Act 65
- March 4, 1852: Act to incorporate the Milwaukee University, 1852 Act 79
- April 16, 1852: Act to set apart and incorporate the County of Kewaunee, 1852 Act 363
- April 17, 1852: Act to provide for the organization of a separate Supreme Court and for the election of Justices thereof, 1852 Act 395
- April 19, 1852: Act to authorize the business of Banking, 1852 Act 479
- April 19, 1852: Act to provide for the registration of Marriages, Births, and Deaths, 1852 Act 492
- April 19, 1852: Act to apportion and district anew the members of the Senate and Assembly of the State of Wisconsin, 1852 Act 499, increased the size of the Senate to 25 members, and the Assembly to 82.
- April 19, 1852: Act relating to Printing, 1852 Act 504

== Party summary ==
=== Senate summary ===
Senate Partisan composition Democratic: 12 seats Free Soil: 1 seat Whig: 6 seats

	Party (Shading indicates majority caucus)			Total	
	Dem.	F.S.	Whig	Total	Vacant
End of previous Legislature	14	2	3	19	0
1st Session	12	1	6	19	0
Final voting share	63.16%	5.26%	31.58%		
Beginning of the next Legislature	17	0	8	25	0

=== Assembly summary ===
Assembly Partisan composition Democratic: 28 seats Free Soil: 6 seats Whig: 32 seats

	Party (Shading indicates majority caucus)			Total	
	Dem.	F.S.	Whig	Total	Vacant
End of previous Legislature	49	7	10	66	0
Start of 1st Session	29	6	31	66	0
After January 30	28	6	32	66	0
Final voting share	42.42%	9.09%	48.48%		
Beginning of the next Legislature	55	7	20	82	0

== Sessions ==
- 1st Regular session: January 14, 1852 – April 19, 1852

== Leaders ==
=== Senate leadership ===
- President of the Senate: Samuel Beall, Lieutenant Governor
- President pro tempore: Eliab B. Dean Jr.

=== Assembly leadership ===
- Speaker of the Assembly: James McMillan Shafter

== Members ==
=== Members of the Senate ===
Members of the Wisconsin Senate for the Fifth Wisconsin Legislature:

Senate Partisan composition Democratic: 12 seats Free Soil: 1 seat Whig: 6 seats

District	Counties	Senator	Party	Residence
01	Brown, Calumet, Door, Manitowoc, Oconto, Outagamie, Sheboygan	Theodore Conkey	Dem.	Appleton
02	Columbia, Marathon, Marquette, Portage, Sauk, Waushara	James S. Alban	Whig	Plover
03	Bad Ax, Chippewa, Crawford, La Crosse, St. Croix, La Pointe	Hiram A. Wright	Dem.	Prairie du Chien
04	Fond du Lac, Waupaca, Winnebago	Bertine Pinckney	Whig	Rosendale
05	Iowa, Richland	Levi Sterling	Whig	Mineral Point
06	Grant	Joel C. Squires	Dem.	Lancaster
07	Lafayette	Samuel G. Bugh	Dem.	Shullsburg
08	Green	Thomas S. Bowen	Dem.	Waupun
09	Dane	Eliab B. Dean Jr.	Dem.	Madison
10	Dodge	Judson Prentice	Whig	Watertown
11	Washington	Harvey G. Turner	Dem.	Ozaukee
12	Jefferson	Alva Stewart	Whig	Fort Atkinson
13	Waukesha	E. B. West	Whig	Waukesha
14	Walworth	Eleazer Wakeley	Dem.	Whitewater
15	Rock	Andrew Palmer	Dem.	Janesville
16	Kenosha	John Sharpstein	Dem.	Milwaukee
17	Racine	Stephen O. Bennett	Free Soil	Racine
18	Milwaukee (Southern Half)	Duncan Reed	Dem.	Milwaukee
19	Milwaukee (Northern Half)	Francis Huebschmann	Dem.	Milwaukee

=== Members of the Assembly ===
Members of the Assembly for the Fifth Wisconsin Legislature:

Assembly Partisan composition Democratic: 28 seats Free Soil: 6 seat Whig: 32 seats

Senate District	County	District	Representative	Party	Residence
03	Bad Ax, Chippewa, Crawford, La Crosse		Andrew Briggs	Dem.	Bad Ax
01	Brown, Door, Oconto, Outagamie		Urial H. Peak	Dem.	Green Bay
01	Calumet		James Cramond	Dem.	Manchester
02	Columbia		James T. Lewis	Dem.	Columbus
09	Dane	1	William A. Pierce	Dem.	Sun Prairie
09	Dane	2	Alexander Botkin	Whig	Madison
09	Dane	3	Hiram Giles	Whig	Stoughton
10	Dodge	1	Darius L. Bancroft	Whig	Waupun
10	Dodge	2	Timothy B. Sterling	Whig	Iron Ridge
10	Dodge	3	Maximilian Averbeck	Dem.	Emmet
10	Dodge	4	William H. Green	Dem.	Lowell
10	Dodge	5	Horace D. Patch	Dem.	Beaver Dam
04	Fond du Lac	1	Benjamin F. Moore	Whig	Fond du Lac
04	Fond du Lac	2	Nicholas M. Donaldson	Whig	Waupun
06	Grant	1	William Richardson	Whig	Fairplay
06	Grant	2	Noah Clemmons	Dem.	Platteville
06	Grant	3	David McKee	Dem.	Potosi
06	Grant	4	J. Allen Barber	Whig	Lancaster
08	Green		Truman J. Safford	Whig	Exeter
05	Iowa & Richland	1	John Toay	Whig	Mineral Point
05	Iowa & Richland	2	Luman M. Strong	Dem.	Highland
12	Jefferson	1	Thomas R. Mott	Whig	Watertown
12	Jefferson	2	Jacob Skinner	Whig	Palmyra
12	Jefferson	3	A. H. Van Norstrand	Dem.	Jefferson
16	Kenosha	1	C. Latham Sholes	Free Soil	Kenosha
16	Kenosha	2	Lathrop Burgess	Free Soil	Salem
03	La Pointe & St. Croix		Otis W. Hoyt	Dem.	Hudson
07	Lafayette	1	Matthew Murphy (res. Jan. 30)	Dem.	New Diggings
07	Lafayette	1	George W. Hammett (from Jan. 30)	Whig	
07	Lafayette	2	James H. Earnest	Whig	Shullsburg
01	Manitowoc		Ezekiel Ricker	Dem.	Manitowoc
02	Marathon & Portage		George W. Cate	Dem.	Amherst
02	Marquette & Waushara		Eleazer Root	Whig	Dartford
19	Milwaukee	1	Charles Cain	Whig	Milwaukee
19	Milwaukee	2	Joseph A. Phelps	Whig	Milwaukee
18	Milwaukee	3	Wallace W. Graham	Dem.	Milwaukee
18	Milwaukee	4	Jonathan L. Burnham	Whig	Milwaukee
18	Milwaukee	5	Valentin Knœll	Dem.	Milwaukee
18	Milwaukee	6	Edward Hasse	Dem.	Milwaukee
19	Milwaukee	7	William Beck	Dem.	Milwaukee
17	Racine	1	William L. Utley	Free Soil	Racine
17	Racine	2	Abram Gordon	Whig	Racine
17	Racine	3	James Catton	Whig	Burlington
15	Rock	1	William A. Lawrence	Whig	Janesville
15	Rock	2	John Hackett	Dem.	Spring Valley
15	Rock	3	George R. Ramsey	Whig	Janesville
15	Rock	4	Asal Kinney	Whig	Beloit
15	Rock	5	Simeon W. Abbott	Whig	Lima
02	Sauk		Jonathan W. Fyffe	Whig	Prairie du Sac
01	Sheboygan	1	James McMillan Shafter	Whig	Sheboygan
01	Sheboygan	2	David B. Conger	Whig	Greenbush
14	Walworth	1	Joel H. Cooper	Free Soil	Elkhorn
14	Walworth	2	Zerah Mead	Whig	Spring Prairie
14	Walworth	3	Timothy H. Fellows	Free Soil	Genoa
14	Walworth	4	Lewis N. Wood	Whig	Whitewater
14	Walworth	5	Stephen Steele Barlow	Free Soil	Walworth
11	Washington	1	Simon D. Powers	Dem.	Port Washington
11	Washington	2	Phineas M. Johnson	Dem.	Grafton
11	Washington	3	Adam Staats	Dem.	Staatsville
11	Washington	4	Densmore W. Maxon	Dem.	Cedar Creek
11	Washington	5	Baruch S. Weil	Dem.	West Bend
13	Waukesha	1	John U. Hilliard	Dem.	Merton
13	Waukesha	2	Denison Worthington	Whig	Summit
13	Waukesha	3	Thomas Sugden	Whig	North Prairie
13	Waukesha	4	Publius V. Monroe	Dem.	New Berlin
13	Waukesha	5	Findley McNaughton	Dem.	Vernon
04	Waupaca & Winnebago		Dudley C. Blodget	Whig	Oshkosh

== Employees ==
=== Senate employees ===
- Chief Clerk: John K. Williams
- Sergeant-at-Arms: Patrick Cosgrove

=== Assembly employees ===
- Chief Clerk: Alexander T. Gray
- Sergeant-at-Arms: Elisha Starr
