= Wisconsin's Ozaukee County Assembly district =

Former American legislative district

Wisconsin's Ozaukee County State Assembly district
- Obsolete
- Notes: 1861–1871; 1876–1972

Wisconsin's Ozaukee County Assembly district was a district in the Wisconsin State Assembly for most of the history of the state of Wisconsin, prior to the legislative redistricting reforms of 1972 which created the current numbered districts. Located in southeast Wisconsin, the district comprised the whole of Ozaukee County, Wisconsin.

The district was in use for elections from 1861 to 1870, and again from 1876 to 1970.

== List of representatives ==
List of representatives from the Ozaukee County district
Member	Party	Residence	Term start	Term end	Leg.
Ozaukee County was previously divided into the Ozaukee 1st and Ozaukee 2nd Assembly districts
District created by 1861 Wisconsin Act 216
John A. Schletz	Dem.	Grafton	January 6, 1862	January 5, 1863	15th
Robert Power	Dem.	Port Washington	January 5, 1863	January 4, 1864	16th
William T. Bonniwell Jr.	Dem.	Cedarburg	January 4, 1864	January 1, 1866	17th 18th
James McCarthy	Dem.	Port Washington	January 1, 1866	January 7, 1867	19th
Frederick W. Horn	Dem.	Cedarburg	January 7, 1867	January 4, 1869	20th 21st
Job Haskell	Dem.	Saukville	January 4, 1869	January 3, 1870	22nd
Adolphus Zimmermann	Dem.	Mequon	January 3, 1870	January 2, 1871	23rd
Charles G. Meyer	Dem.	Fredonia	January 2, 1871	January 1, 1872	24th
District abolished by 1871 Wisconsin Act 156; Ozaukee County re-divided into the Ozaukee 1st and Ozaukee 2nd Assembly districts
District re-established by 1876 Wisconsin Act 343
Gustav Gotze	Ref.	Port Washington	January 1, 1877	January 7, 1878	30th
William Henry Fitzgerald	Dem.	Cedarburg	January 7, 1878	January 6, 1879	31st
William Henry Fitzgerald	Ind.D.	Cedarburg	January 6, 1879	January 3, 1881	32nd 33rd
Charles G. Meyer	Ind.D.	Port Washington	January 3, 1881	January 2, 1882	34th
Frederick W. Horn	Dem.	Cedarburg	January 2, 1882	January 1, 1883	35th
John J. Race	Dem.	Fredoniaison	January 1, 1883	January 3, 1887	36th 37th
Frederick W. Horn	Ind.D.	Cedarburg	January 3, 1887	January 5, 1891	38th 39th
William Henry Fitzgerald	Dem.	Cedarburg	January 5, 1891	January 7, 1895	40th 41st
Herman Schellenberg	Dem.	Cedarburg	January 7, 1895	January 2, 1899	42nd 43rd
Nicholas E. Becker	Dem.	Fredonia	January 2, 1899	January 7, 1901	44th
Herman Schellenberg	Dem.	Cedarburg	January 7, 1901	January 5, 1903	45th
Nicholas E. Becker	Dem.	Fredonia	January 5, 1903	January 2, 1905	46th
Peter Pierron	Rep.	Belgium	January 2, 1905	January 7, 1907	47th
William J. Bichler	Dem.	Belgium	January 7, 1907	January 6, 1913	48th 49th 50th
Jacob Dietrich	Dem.	Cedarburg	January 6, 1913	January 4, 1915	51st
Eugene J. Poole	Dem.	Cedarburg	January 4, 1915	January 6, 1919	52nd 53rd
Louis L. Pierron	Rep.	Belgium	January 6, 1919	January 1, 1923	54th 55th
Fred J. Busse	Rep.	Mequon	January 1, 1923	January 3, 1927	56th 57th
John J. Jungers	Rep.	Grafton	January 3, 1927	January 7, 1929	58th
Louis G. Kieker	Dem.	Thiensville	January 7, 1929	January 5, 1931	59th
John Long	Rep.	Grafton	January 5, 1931	January 2, 1933	60th
Louis G. Kieker	Dem.	Thiensville	January 2, 1933	January 7, 1935	61st
Nicholas J. Bichler	Dem.	Belgium	January 7, 1935	January 6, 1941	62nd 63rd 64th
Nicholas J. Bichler	Dem.	Belgium	January 6, 1941	September 30, 1941	65th
--Vacant--			September 30, 1941	January 4, 1943	65th
Fred L. Feierstein	Rep.	Random Lake	January 4, 1943	January 1, 1945	66th
Fred L. Feierstein	Rep.	Random Lake	January 1, 1945	October 29, 1945	67th
--Vacant--			October 29, 1945	January 6, 1947	67th
Ralph Zaun	Rep.	Grafton	January 6, 1947	January 1, 1951	68th 69th
Nicholas J. Bichler	Dem.	Belgium	January 1, 1951	January 5, 1953	70th
Warren A. Grady	Rep.	Port Washington	January 5, 1953	January 2, 1961	71st 72nd 73rd 74th
J. Curtis McKay	Rep.	Thiensville	January 2, 1961	January 6, 1969	75th 76th 77th 78th
Herbert Schowalter	Rep.	Saukville	January 6, 1969	January 1, 1973	79th 80th
District abolished by 1971 Wisconsin Act 304; Ozaukee County was divided between the 12th (part) and 60th (most) Assembly districts
