= Wisconsin's 33rd Senate district =

American legislative district in southeast Wisconsin

Wisconsin's 33rd State Senate district
- 2024 map defined in 2023 Wisc. Act 94; 2022 map defined in Johnson v. Wisconsin Elections Commission; 2011 map was defined in 2011 Wisc. Act 43 composed of Assembly districts 97, 98, and 99
Senator
Chris Kapenga; R–Delafield
since August 6, 2015 (10 years, 205 days)
- Demographics: 93.27% White; 0.79% Black; 2.59% Hispanic; 1.49% Asian; 1.1% Native American; 0.08% Hawaiian/Pacific Islander
- Population (2020) • Voting age: 177,842; 138,561
- Website: Official website
- Notes: Southeast Wisconsin

The 33rd Senate district of Wisconsin is one of 33 districts in the Wisconsin Senate. Located in southeastern Wisconsin, the district comprises most of western Waukesha County along with parts of eastern Jefferson County, southwest Washington County, and southeast Dodge County. It includes the cities of Delafield, Hartford, and Oconomowoc, and the villages of Chenequa, Dousman, Eagle, Hartland, Lac La Belle, Merton, Neosho, North Prairie, Palmyra, Sussex, and Wales.

== Current elected officials ==
Chris Kapenga is the senator representing the 33rd district. He was first elected to the Senate in a 2015 special election. Before becoming a state senator, he was a member of the Wisconsin State Assembly from 2011 through 2015.

Each Wisconsin State Senate district is composed of three State Assembly districts. The 33rd Senate district comprises the 97th, 98th, and 99th Assembly districts. The current representatives of those districts are:

- Assembly District 97: Cindi Duchow (R–Delafield)
- Assembly District 98: Jim Piwowarczyk (R–Hubertus)
- Assembly District 99: Barbara Dittrich (R–Oconomowoc)

The district is located entirely within Wisconsin's 5th congressional district, which is represented by U.S. Representative Scott L. Fitzgerald.

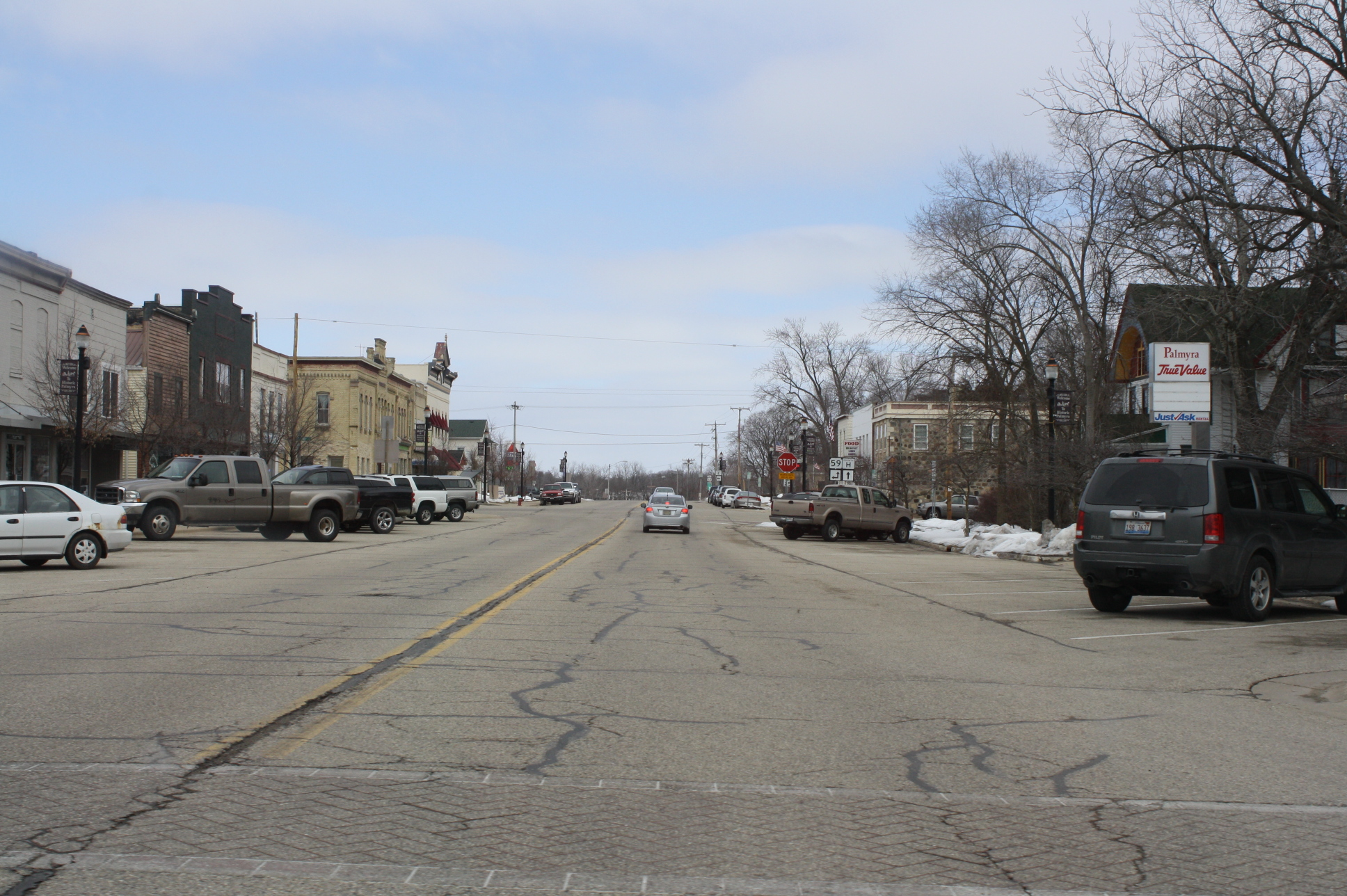
Downtown Palmyra

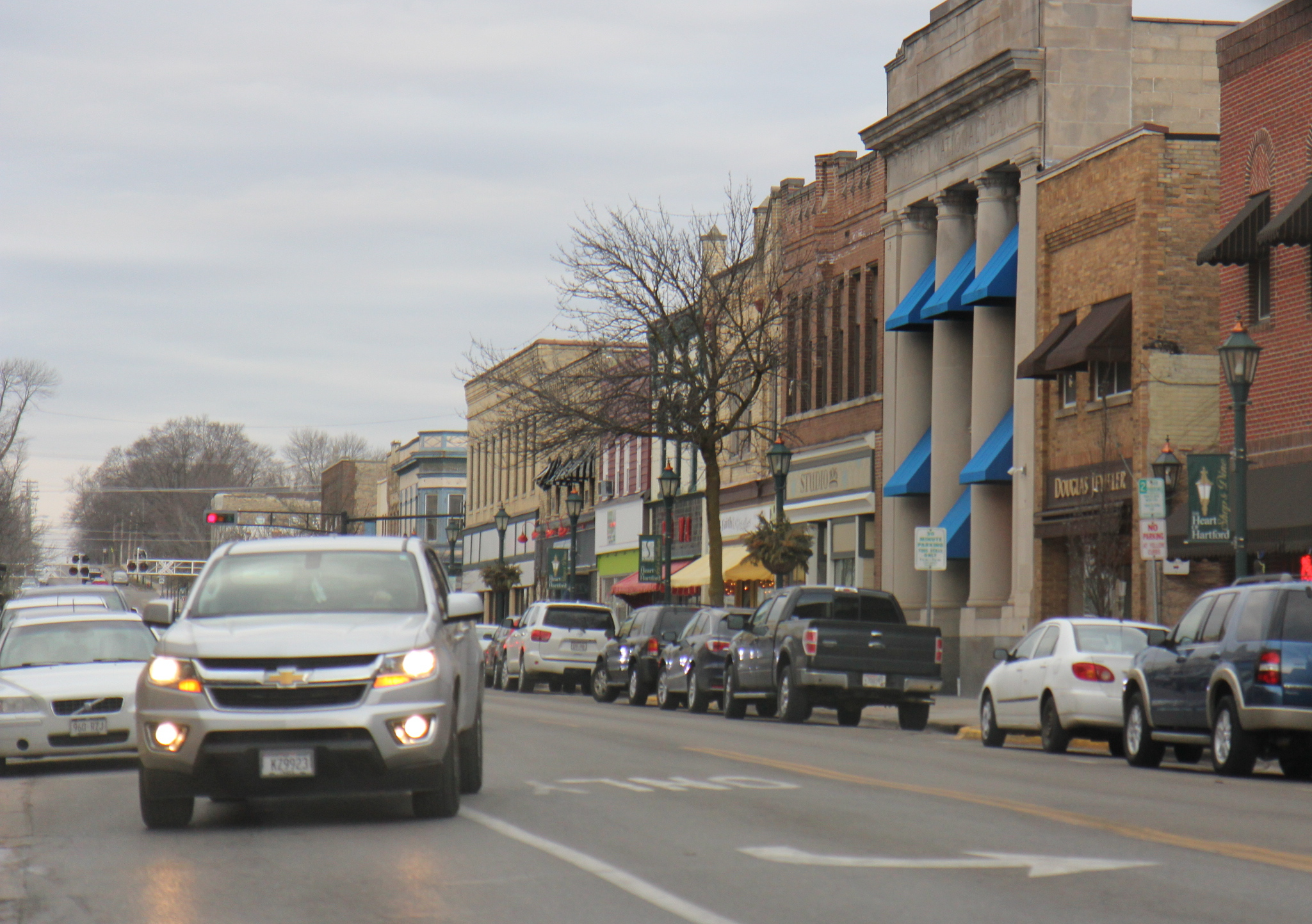
Downtown Hartford

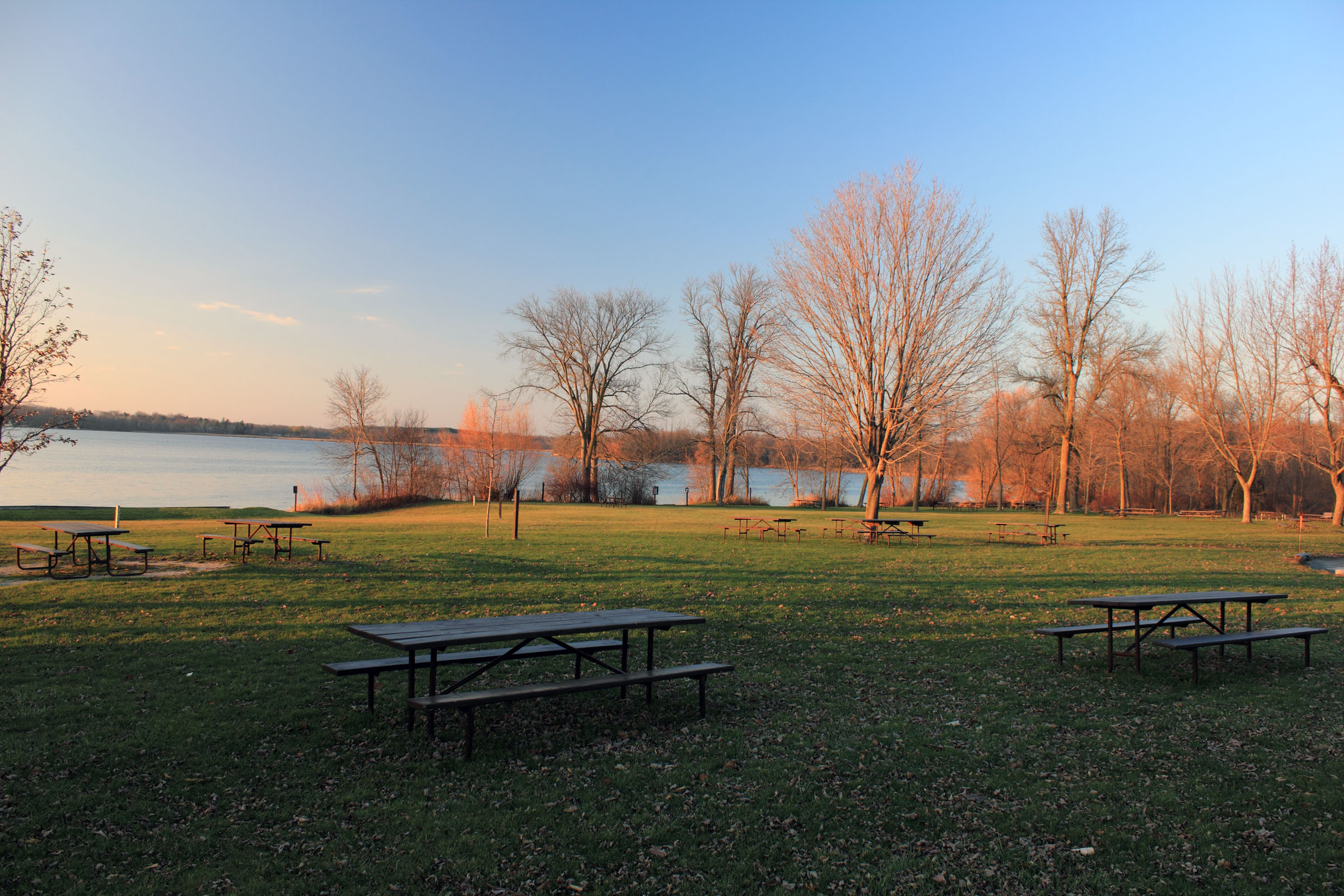
Pike Lake State Park

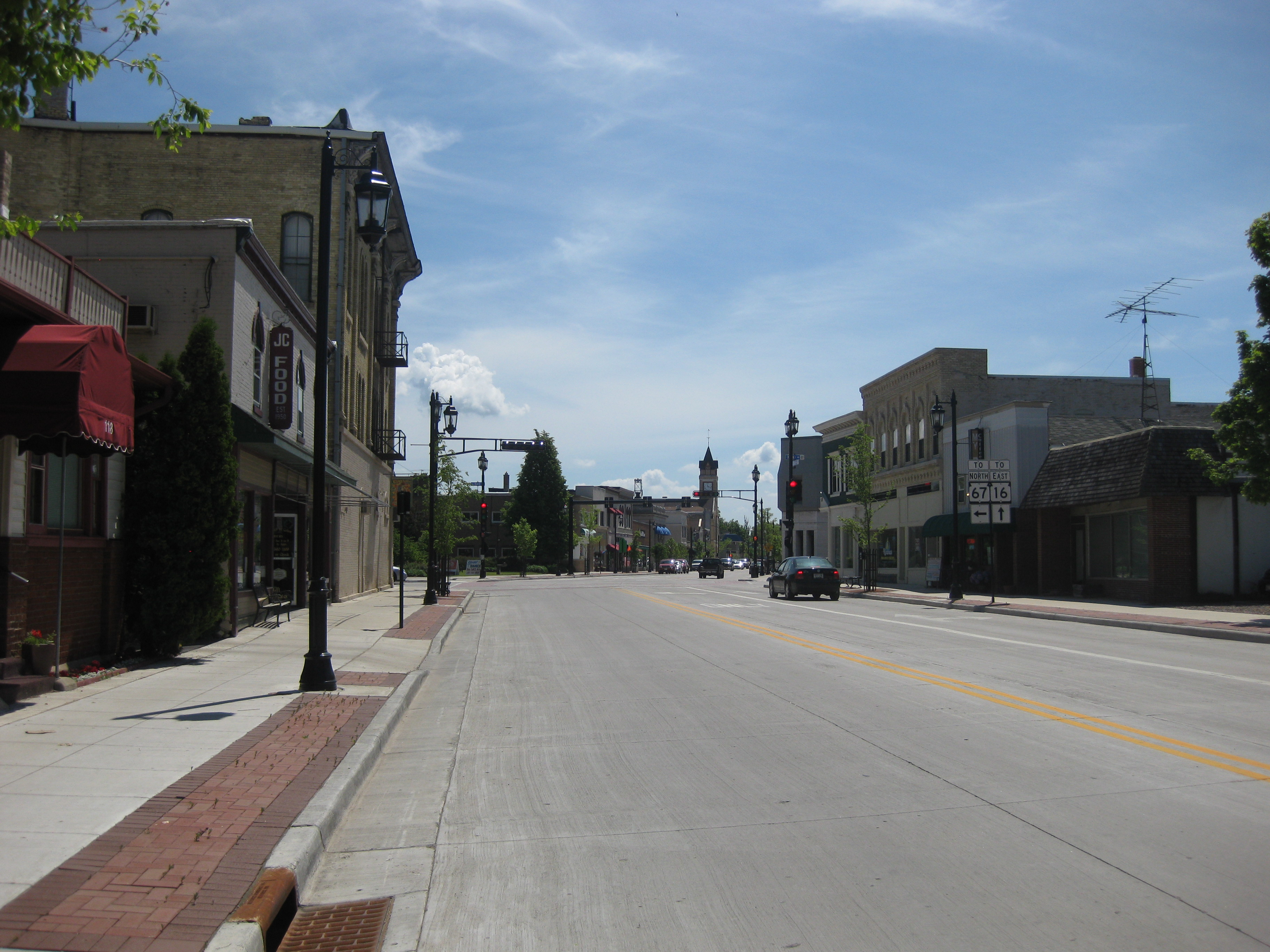
Downtown Oconomowoc

== Past senators ==
Previous senators include:

Note: the boundaries of districts have changed repeatedly over history. Previous politicians of a specific numbered district have represented a completely different geographic area, due to redistricting.

Senator	Party	Notes	Session	Years	District Definition
District created by 1861 Wisc. Act 216.				1861	Eastern Dodge County: Town of Ashippun; Town of Herman; Town of Hubbard; Town of Hustisford; Town of Lebanon; Town of LeRoy; Town of Lomira; Town of Rubicon; Town of Theresa; Town of Williamstown; Village of Horicon
Satterlee Clark	Dem.		15th	1862	Eastern Dodge County: Town of Ashippun; Town of Herman; Town of Hubbard; Town of Hustisford; Town of Lebanon; Town of LeRoy; Town of Lomira; Town of Rubicon; Town of Theresa; Town of Williamstown; Village of Horicon
Satterlee Clark	Dem.		16th	1863	Eastern Dodge County: Town of Ashippun; Town of Herman; Town of Hubbard; Town of Hustisford; Town of Lebanon; Town of LeRoy; Town of Lomira; Town of Rubicon; Town of Theresa; Town of Williamstown; Village of Horicon
Satterlee Clark	Dem.		17th	1864	Eastern Dodge County: Town of Ashippun; Town of Herman; Town of Hubbard; Town of Hustisford; Town of Lebanon; Town of LeRoy; Town of Lomira; Town of Rubicon; Town of Theresa; Town of Williamstown; Village of Horicon
Satterlee Clark	Dem.		18th	1865	Eastern Dodge County: Town of Ashippun; Town of Herman; Town of Hubbard; Town of Hustisford; Town of Lebanon; Town of LeRoy; Town of Lomira; Town of Rubicon; Town of Theresa; Town of Williamstown; Village of Horicon
Satterlee Clark	Dem.		19th	1866	Eastern Dodge County: Town of Ashippun; Town of Herman; Town of Hubbard; Town of Hustisford; Town of Lebanon; Town of LeRoy; Town of Lomira; Town of Rubicon; Town of Theresa; Town of Williamstown; Village of Horicon
Satterlee Clark	Dem.		20th	1867	Eastern Dodge County: Town of Ashippun; Town of Clyman; Town of Emmet; Town of Herman; Town of Hubbard; Town of Hustisford; Town of Lebanon; Town of LeRoy; Town of Lomira; Town of Rubicon; Town of Theresa; Town of Williamstown; Village of Horicon; Wards 5, 6, City of Watertown
Satterlee Clark	Dem.		21st	1868	Eastern Dodge County: Town of Ashippun; Town of Clyman; Town of Emmet; Town of Herman; Town of Hubbard; Town of Hustisford; Town of Lebanon; Town of LeRoy; Town of Lomira; Town of Rubicon; Town of Theresa; Town of Williamstown; Village of Horicon; Wards 5, 6, City of Watertown
Satterlee Clark	Dem.		22nd	1869	Eastern Dodge County: Town of Ashippun; Town of Clyman; Town of Emmet; Town of Herman; Town of Hubbard; Town of Hustisford; Town of Lebanon; Town of LeRoy; Town of Lomira; Town of Rubicon; Town of Theresa; Town of Williamstown; Village of Horicon; Wards 5, 6, City of Watertown
Satterlee Clark	Dem.		23rd	1870	Eastern Dodge County: Town of Ashippun; Town of Clyman; Town of Emmet; Town of Herman; Town of Hubbard; Town of Hustisford; Town of Lebanon; Town of LeRoy; Town of Lomira; Town of Rubicon; Town of Theresa; Town of Williamstown; Village of Horicon; Wards 5, 6, City of Watertown
Satterlee Clark	Dem.		24th	1871	Eastern Dodge County: Town of Ashippun; Town of Clyman; Town of Emmet; Town of Herman; Town of Hubbard; Town of Hustisford; Town of Lebanon; Town of LeRoy; Town of Lomira; Town of Rubicon; Town of Theresa; Town of Williamstown; Village of Horicon; Wards 5, 6, City of Watertown
Lyman Morgan	Dem.	Redistricted from the 3rd district.	25th	1872	Ozaukee and Washington counties 1870 population: 39,483; 1875 population: 40,407; 1880 population: 38,904; 1885 population: 39,489
Adam Schantz	Dem.		26th	1873	Ozaukee and Washington counties 1870 population: 39,483; 1875 population: 40,407; 1880 population: 38,904; 1885 population: 39,489
Adam Schantz	Dem.		27th	1874	Ozaukee and Washington counties 1870 population: 39,483; 1875 population: 40,407; 1880 population: 38,904; 1885 population: 39,489
Gilead J. Wilmot	Dem.		28th	1875	Ozaukee and Washington counties 1870 population: 39,483; 1875 population: 40,407; 1880 population: 38,904; 1885 population: 39,489
Gilead J. Wilmot	Dem.		29th	1876	Ozaukee and Washington counties 1870 population: 39,483; 1875 population: 40,407; 1880 population: 38,904; 1885 population: 39,489
Philip Schneider	Dem.		30th	1877	Ozaukee and Washington counties 1870 population: 39,483; 1875 population: 40,407; 1880 population: 38,904; 1885 population: 39,489
Philip Schneider	Dem.		31st	1878	Ozaukee and Washington counties 1870 population: 39,483; 1875 population: 40,407; 1880 population: 38,904; 1885 population: 39,489
Lyman Morgan	Dem.		32nd	1879	Ozaukee and Washington counties 1870 population: 39,483; 1875 population: 40,407; 1880 population: 38,904; 1885 population: 39,489
Lyman Morgan	Dem.		33rd	1880	Ozaukee and Washington counties 1870 population: 39,483; 1875 population: 40,407; 1880 population: 38,904; 1885 population: 39,489
George F. Hunt	Dem.		34th	1881	Ozaukee and Washington counties 1870 population: 39,483; 1875 population: 40,407; 1880 population: 38,904; 1885 population: 39,489
George F. Hunt	Dem.		35th	1882	Ozaukee and Washington counties 1870 population: 39,483; 1875 population: 40,407; 1880 population: 38,904; 1885 population: 39,489
Edward Reed Blake	Dem.		36th	1883–1884	Ozaukee and Washington counties 1870 population: 39,483; 1875 population: 40,407; 1880 population: 38,904; 1885 population: 39,489
Edward Reed Blake	Dem.		37th	1885–1886	Ozaukee and Washington counties 1870 population: 39,483; 1875 population: 40,407; 1880 population: 38,904; 1885 population: 39,489
Peter Lochen	Dem.		38th	1887–1888	Ozaukee and Washington counties 1870 population: 39,483; 1875 population: 40,407; 1880 population: 38,904; 1885 population: 39,489
Peter Lochen	Dem.		39th	1889–1890	Ozaukee and Washington counties and Eastern Waukesha County: Town of Brookfield; Town of Lisbon; Town of Menomonee; Town of Muskego; Town of New Berlin; Town of Pewaukee; Town of Waukesha; Village of Waukesha; 1885 population: 55,580
Frederick W. Horn	Dem.	Died January 1893	40th	1891–1892	Ozaukee and Washington counties and Eastern Waukesha County: Town of Brookfield; Town of Lisbon; Town of Menomonee; Town of Muskego; Town of New Berlin; Town of Pewaukee; Town of Waukesha; Village of Waukesha; 1885 population: 55,580
--Vacant--			41st	1893–1894	Ozaukee and Washington counties and Eastern Dodge County: Town of Burnett; Town of Chester; Town of Hubbard; Town of LeRoy; Town of Lomira; Town of Theresa; Town of Trenton; Town of Williamstown; City of Mayville; South Ward, City of Waupun; 1890 population: 52,778
Stephen F. Mayer	Dem.		42nd	1895–1896	Ozaukee and Washington counties and Eastern Dodge County: Town of Burnett; Town of Chester; Town of Hubbard; Town of LeRoy; Town of Lomira; Town of Theresa; Town of Trenton; Town of Williamstown; City of Mayville; South Ward, City of Waupun; 1890 population: 52,778
Stephen F. Mayer	Dem.		43rd	1897–1898	Washington and Waukesha counties 1895 population: 60,639; 1900 population: 58,818
Alfred M. Jones	Rep.		44th	1899–1900	Washington and Waukesha counties 1895 population: 60,639; 1900 population: 58,818
Alfred M. Jones	Rep.		45th	1901–1902	Washington and Waukesha counties 1895 population: 60,639; 1900 population: 58,818
Ernst Merton	Dem.		46th	1903–1904	Washington and Waukesha counties 1895 population: 60,639; 1900 population: 58,818
Ernst Merton	Dem.		47th	1905–1906	Washington and Waukesha counties 1895 population: 60,639; 1900 population: 58,818
Henry Lockney	Rep.		48th	1907–1908	Washington and Waukesha counties 1895 population: 60,639; 1900 population: 58,818
Henry Lockney	Rep.		49th	1909–1910	Washington and Waukesha counties 1895 population: 60,639; 1900 population: 58,818
George E. Hoyt	Rep.		50th	1911–1912	Washington and Waukesha counties 1895 population: 60,639; 1900 population: 58,818
George E. Hoyt	Rep.		51st	1913–1914	Jefferson and Waukesha counties 1910 population: 71,406
Charles Mülberger	Dem.		52nd	1915–1916	Jefferson and Waukesha counties 1910 population: 71,406
Charles Mülberger	Dem.		53rd	1917–1918	Jefferson and Waukesha counties 1910 population: 71,406
Charles Mülberger	Dem.		54th	1919–1920	Jefferson and Waukesha counties 1910 population: 71,406
Charles Mülberger	Dem.		55th	1921–1922	Jefferson and Waukesha counties 1910 population: 71,406
John C. Schuman	Rep.		56th	1923–1924	Jefferson and Waukesha counties 1910 population: 71,406
John C. Schuman	Rep.		57th	1925–1926	Jefferson and Waukesha counties 1910 population: 71,406
John C. Schuman	Rep.		58th	1927–1928	Jefferson and Waukesha counties 1910 population: 71,406
John C. Schuman	Rep.		59th	1929–1930	Jefferson and Waukesha counties 1910 population: 71,406
William H. Edwards	Rep.		60th	1931–1932	Jefferson and Waukesha counties 1910 population: 71,406
William H. Edwards	Rep.		61st	1933–1934	Jefferson and Waukesha counties 1910 population: 71,406
Chester Dempsey	Dem.		62nd	1935–1936	Jefferson and Waukesha counties 1910 population: 71,406
Chester Dempsey	Dem.		63rd	1937–1938	Jefferson and Waukesha counties 1910 population: 71,406
William A. Freehoff	Rep.		64th	1939–1940	Jefferson and Waukesha counties 1910 population: 71,406
William A. Freehoff	Rep.		65th	1941–1942	Jefferson and Waukesha counties 1910 population: 71,406
William A. Freehoff	Rep.		66th	1943–1944	Jefferson and Waukesha counties 1910 population: 71,406
William A. Freehoff	Rep.		67th	1945–1946	Jefferson and Waukesha counties 1910 population: 71,406
Chester Dempsey	Rep.	Died October 1969.	68th	1947–1948	Jefferson and Waukesha counties 1910 population: 71,406
Chester Dempsey	Rep.	Died October 1969.	69th	1949–1950	Jefferson and Waukesha counties 1910 population: 71,406
Chester Dempsey	Rep.	Died October 1969.	70th	1951–1952	Jefferson and Waukesha counties 1910 population: 71,406
Chester Dempsey	Rep.	Died October 1969.	71st	1953–1954	Jefferson and Waukesha counties 1910 population: 71,406
Chester Dempsey	Rep.	Died October 1969.	72nd	1955–1956	Jefferson and Waukesha counties 1910 population: 71,406
Chester Dempsey	Rep.	Died October 1969.	73rd	1957–1958	Jefferson and Waukesha counties 1910 population: 71,406
Chester Dempsey	Rep.	Died October 1969.	74th	1959–1960	Jefferson and Waukesha counties 1910 population: 71,406
Chester Dempsey	Rep.	Died October 1969.	75th	1961–1962	Jefferson and Waukesha counties 1910 population: 71,406
Chester Dempsey	Rep.	Died October 1969.	76th	1963–1964	Jefferson and Waukesha counties 1910 population: 71,406
Chester Dempsey	Rep.	Died October 1969.	77th	1965–1966	Northern Waukesha County
Chester Dempsey	Rep.	Died October 1969.	78th	1967–1968	Northern Waukesha County
Chester Dempsey	Rep.	Died October 1969.	79th	1969–1970	Northern Waukesha County
--Vacant--			79th	1969–1970	Northern Waukesha County
Roger P. Murphy	Rep.	Resigned February 1980 to become a Wisconsin circuit court judge.	80th	1971–1972	Northern Waukesha County
Roger P. Murphy	Rep.	Resigned February 1980 to become a Wisconsin circuit court judge.	81st	1973–1974	Northern Waukesha County
Roger P. Murphy	Rep.	Resigned February 1980 to become a Wisconsin circuit court judge.	82nd	1975–1976	Northern Waukesha County
Roger P. Murphy	Rep.	Resigned February 1980 to become a Wisconsin circuit court judge.	83rd	1977–1978	Northern Waukesha County
Roger P. Murphy	Rep.	Resigned February 1980 to become a Wisconsin circuit court judge.	84th	1979–1980	Northern Waukesha County
--Vacant--			84th	1979–1980	Northern Waukesha County
Susan Engeleiter	Rep.	Won 1980 special election. Resigned April 1989 to become Administrator of the Small Business Administration.	84th	1979–1980	Northern Waukesha County
Susan Engeleiter	Rep.	Won 1980 special election. Resigned April 1989 to become Administrator of the Small Business Administration.	85th	1981–1982	Northern Waukesha County
Susan Engeleiter	Rep.	Won 1980 special election. Resigned April 1989 to become Administrator of the Small Business Administration.	86th	1983–1984	
Susan Engeleiter	Rep.	Won 1980 special election. Resigned April 1989 to become Administrator of the Small Business Administration.	87th	1985–1986	Eastern Waukesha County; Part of Milwaukee County
Susan Engeleiter	Rep.	Won 1980 special election. Resigned April 1989 to become Administrator of the Small Business Administration.	88th	1987–1988	Eastern Waukesha County; Part of Milwaukee County
Susan Engeleiter	Rep.	Won 1980 special election. Resigned April 1989 to become Administrator of the Small Business Administration.	89th	1989–1990	Eastern Waukesha County; Part of Milwaukee County
--Vacant--			89th	1989–1990	Eastern Waukesha County; Part of Milwaukee County
Margaret Farrow	Rep.	Won 1989 special election. Resigned May 2001 to become Lieutenant Governor of Wisconsin.	89th	1989–1990	Eastern Waukesha County; Part of Milwaukee County
Margaret Farrow	Rep.	Won 1989 special election. Resigned May 2001 to become Lieutenant Governor of Wisconsin.	90th	1991–1992	Eastern Waukesha County; Part of Milwaukee County
Margaret Farrow	Rep.	Won 1989 special election. Resigned May 2001 to become Lieutenant Governor of Wisconsin.	91st	1993–1994	Eastern Waukesha County; Part of Milwaukee County
Margaret Farrow	Rep.	Won 1989 special election. Resigned May 2001 to become Lieutenant Governor of Wisconsin.	92nd	1995–1996	Eastern Waukesha County; Part of Milwaukee County
Margaret Farrow	Rep.	Won 1989 special election. Resigned May 2001 to become Lieutenant Governor of Wisconsin.	93rd	1997–1998	Eastern Waukesha County; Part of Milwaukee County
Margaret Farrow	Rep.	Won 1989 special election. Resigned May 2001 to become Lieutenant Governor of Wisconsin.	94th	1999–2000	Eastern Waukesha County; Part of Milwaukee County
Margaret Farrow	Rep.	Won 1989 special election. Resigned May 2001 to become Lieutenant Governor of Wisconsin.	95th	2001–2002	Eastern Waukesha County; Part of Milwaukee County
--Vacant--			95th	2001–2002	Eastern Waukesha County; Part of Milwaukee County
Theodore Kanavas	Rep.		95th	2001–2002	Eastern Waukesha County; Part of Milwaukee County
Theodore Kanavas	Rep.		96th	2003–2004	Northern Waukesha County; Southeast Washington County
Theodore Kanavas	Rep.		97th	2005–2006	Northern Waukesha County; Southeast Washington County
Theodore Kanavas	Rep.		98th	2007–2008	Northern Waukesha County; Southeast Washington County
Theodore Kanavas	Rep.		99th	2009–2010	Northern Waukesha County; Southeast Washington County
Rich Zipperer	Rep.	Resigned Aug. 2012.	100th	2011–2012	Northern Waukesha County; Southeast Washington County
--Vacant--			100th	2011–2012	Northern Waukesha County; Southeast Washington County
Paul Farrow	Rep.	Resigned July 2015.	101st	2013–2014	Central Waukesha County
Paul Farrow	Rep.	Resigned July 2015.	102nd	2015–2016	Central Waukesha County
--Vacant--			102nd	2015–2016	Central Waukesha County
Chris Kapenga	Rep.	Won 2015 special election.	102nd	2015–2016	Central Waukesha County
Chris Kapenga	Rep.	Won 2015 special election.	103rd	2017–2018	Central Waukesha County
Chris Kapenga	Rep.	Won 2015 special election.	104th	2019–2020	Central Waukesha County
Chris Kapenga	Rep.	Won 2015 special election.	105th	2021–2022	Central Waukesha County
Chris Kapenga	Rep.	Won 2015 special election.	106th	2023–2024	Central Waukesha County
Chris Kapenga	Rep.	Won 2015 special election.	107th	2025–2026	
