= Frederick W. Horn =

19th century American politician

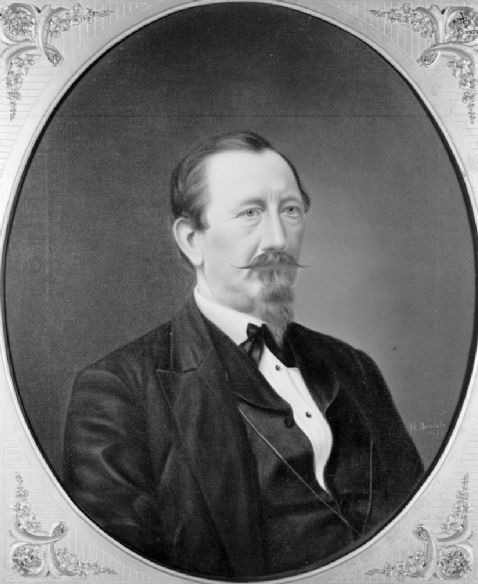
- Portrait ca. 1872 by Hugo Broich

4th, 7th, & 25th Speaker of the Wisconsin State Assembly
- In office January 13, 1875 – January 12, 1876
- Preceded by: Gabriel Bouck
- Succeeded by: Sam Fifield
- In office January 11, 1854 – January 10, 1855
- Preceded by: Henry L. Palmer
- Succeeded by: Charles C. Sholes
- In office January 8, 1851 – January 14, 1852
- Preceded by: Moses M. Strong
- Succeeded by: James McMillan Shafter

Member of the Wisconsin Senate
- In office January 5, 1891 – January 15, 1893 (died); June 5, 1848 – January 6, 1851
Senate terms detail
In office January 5, 1891 – January 15, 1893
Preceded by	Peter Lochen
Succeeded by	Stephen F. Mayer
Constituency	33rd Senate district
In office June 5, 1848 – January 6, 1851
Preceded by	Position established
Succeeded by	Harvey G. Turner
Constituency	11th Senate district

1st Mayor of Cedarburg, Wisconsin
- In office April 1885 – April 1892
- Preceded by: Position established
- Succeeded by: John F. Bruss

Member of the Wisconsin State Assembly
- In office 1851, 1854, 1857, 1859, 1860, 1867, 1868, 1872, 1875, 1882, 1887–1889, 1889–1891
Assembly terms detail
In office January 3, 1887 – January 5, 1891
Preceded by	John J. Race
Succeeded by	William Henry Fitzgerald
Constituency	Ozaukee County district
In office January 2, 1882 – January 1, 1883
Preceded by	Charles G. Meyer
Succeeded by	John J. Race
Constituency	Ozaukee County district
In office January 4, 1875 – January 3, 1876
Preceded by	Adolphus Zimmermann
Succeeded by	William Carbys
Constituency	Ozaukee 2nd district
In office January 1, 1872 – January 6, 1873
Preceded by	Charles G. Meyer (Ozaukee County district)
Succeeded by	Adolphus Zimmermann
Constituency	Ozaukee 2nd district
In office January 7, 1867 – January 4, 1869
Preceded by	James McCarthy
Succeeded by	Job Haskell
Constituency	Ozaukee County district
In office January 3, 1859 – January 7, 1861
Preceded by	Berndt Zastrow-Küssow
Succeeded by	William F. Opitz
Constituency	Ozaukee 2nd district
In office January 5, 1857 – January 4, 1858
Preceded by	William Vogenitz
Succeeded by	Berndt Zastrow-Küssow
Constituency	Ozaukee 2nd district
In office January 2, 1854 – January 1, 1855
Preceded by	Charles E. Chamberlain
Succeeded by	William H. Ramsey
Constituency	Ozaukee 2nd district
In office January 6, 1851 – January 5, 1852
Preceded by	Solon Johnson
Succeeded by	Simon D. Powers
Constituency	Washington 1st district

Personal details
- Born: August 21, 1815 Linum, Brandenburg, Prussia
- Died: January 15, 1893 (aged 77) Cedarburg, Wisconsin, U.S.
- Resting place: Cedarburg Cemetery; Cedarburg, Wisconsin
- Party: Democratic; Ind. Republican (1875); Ind. Democrat (1880s)
- Spouse(s): Adelheid Schaelher (m. 1845; died 1849) Minna Schaper (m. 1850–1893)
- Children: Bertha B. (Zaun)^{(b. 1850; died 1918)}; Clara^{(b. 1853; died 1900)}; Ernestine^{(b. 1856; died 1875)}; William Horn^{(b. 1859; died 1927)}; Minna^{(b. 1861; died 1900)}; Alex W. Horn^{(b. 1862; died 1919)}; Johanna (Altenhofen)^{(b. 1866; died 1932)}
- Profession: lawyer

Frederick William Horn (August 21, 1815 – January 15, 1893) was a German-American immigrant, lawyer, politician, and Wisconsin pioneer. He served in many elected offices; he was the 4th, 7th, & 25th speaker of the Wisconsin State Assembly, and served a total of 14 years in the Assembly between the 1850s and 1880s, representing Ozaukee County. He also served five years in the Wisconsin Senate—including the first three sessions after Wisconsin statehood and the last two years of his own life. Also near the end of his life, he served as the first mayor of Cedarburg, Wisconsin, serving seven years in that role. He generally identified as a Democrat, but was elected several times as an Independent.

== Early life and career ==
Horn was born in Linum, in the Province of Brandenburg, in the Kingdom of Prussia. He was educated in Berlin, at the Gymnasium of the Gray Friar, but did not graduate, and entered the military service of Prussia.

He emigrated to the United States in 1836, first residing in New York state, then making his way west in 1837. He made his residence in Michigan but traveled extensively through Illinois, Iowa, Missouri, and finally Wisconsin. He arrived in Milwaukee, in the Wisconsin Territory, in 1840 and, in 1841, settled in Mequon, in what was then Washington County. He resided here until his final move, to the neighboring community of Cedarburg, in 1847. He practiced law in Cedarburg and served as Mayor. He also served on the Ozaukee County Board of Supervisors and was editor of the Cedarburg Weekly News.

In 1842 Horn entered his first public office when James Duane Doty, Governor of the Wisconsin Territory, appointed him Justice of the Peace for Washington County. He also served as postmaster for Mequon, while he was residing there, and was Register of Deeds for the county in 1846 and 1847.

== Political career ==
He served as postmaster for Mequon, while he was residing there, was Register of Deeds for the county in 1846 and 1847, and served on the Ozaukee County Board of Supervisors

In 1848, he ran for and was elected to the first session of the Wisconsin State Senate, running as an independent Democrat. He was re-elected in November 1848 to a full two-year term in the Senate.

In 1850, he was elected to the Wisconsin State Assembly for the 1851 session, and was chosen as the Speaker of the Assembly for that session. In 1853, Ozaukee County was created out of the eastern part of Washington County. That same year, Horn was elected as one of the first two representatives of Ozaukee County in the Wisconsin Assembly for the 1854 session, he was again chosen as Speaker for that session.

Later in 1854 and 1855, he served as Wisconsin's Commissioner for Immigration in New York City, directing new immigrants and settlers to Wisconsin.

He served again in the 1859 and 1860 sessions of the Wisconsin Assembly. Also during this time, he represented Wisconsin on the Democratic National Committee, and was Vice President of the 1860 Democratic National Conventions in Charleston and Baltimore. He was also a delegate for Wisconsin at the 1868 Democratic National Convention.

He served as Ozaukee County Commissioner of Schools from 1862 to 1865, but returned to the Assembly again in 1867, 1868, and 1872. He was elected in 1874 with both Democratic and Republican support, and was then chosen as Speaker again for the 1875 session of the Assembly. He went on to serve another five years in the Assembly, in 1882, 1887, 1888, 1889, and 1890.

In 1890, he was elected to a four-year term in the Wisconsin State Senate, but he would die in January 1893 before the end of that term.

Horn was also active in local politics during this time, serving as Mayor of Cedarburg for the first seven years after it was incorporated as a city in 1885, and serving as Chairman of the Ozaukee County Board of Supervisors for the last four years of his life, from 1889 to 1893.

Horn is the namesake of the community of Horns Corners, Wisconsin.

== Family and personal life ==
Horn married Adelheid Schaelher in 1845, but she died in 1849. They had no children. Horn married for a second time in 1850. With his second wife, Minna Schaper, Horn had seven children. Horn died January 15, 1893, in Cedarburg.

== Electoral history ==
=== Wisconsin Assembly (1874) ===
Wisconsin Assembly, Ozaukee 2nd District Election, 1874
Party	Candidate	Votes	%	±%
General Election, November 3, 1874
Independent Democrat	Frederick W. Horn	444	42.13%	
Reform	William F. Jahn	334	31.69%	
Reform	R. Schmidt	276	26.19%	
Total votes		1,054	100.0%	
Democratic hold				

=== Wisconsin Assembly (1881, 1886, 1888) ===
Wisconsin Assembly, Ozaukee District Election, 1881
Party	Candidate	Votes	%	±%
General Election, November 8, 1881
Democratic	Frederick W. Horn	690	42.07%	
Independent Democrat	James McCarthy	527	32.13%	
Republican	Alexander M. Alling	423	25.79%	
Total votes		1,640	100.0%	
Democratic hold				

Wisconsin Assembly, Ozaukee District Election, 1886
Party	Candidate	Votes	%	±%
General Election, November 2, 1886
Independent Democrat	Frederick W. Horn	1,648	61.33%	
Democratic	H. B. Schwim	1,039	38.67%	
Total votes		2,687	100.0%	
Democratic hold				

Wisconsin Assembly, Ozaukee District Election, 1888
Party	Candidate	Votes	%	±%
General Election, November 6, 1888
Independent Democrat	Frederick W. Horn (incumbent)	1,888	40.67%	
Democratic	John J. Race	1,438	30.98%	
Republican	Alexander M. Alling	1,316	28.35%	
Total votes		4,642	100.0%	
Democratic hold				

=== Wisconsin Senate (1890) ===
Wisconsin Senate, 33rd District Election, 1890
Party	Candidate	Votes	%	±%
General Election, November 4, 1890
Democratic	Frederick W. Horn	7,097	71.00%	
Republican	J. E. Trottman	2,878	28.79%	
Prohibition	Mr. Thayer	21	0.21%	
Total votes		9,996	100.0%	
Democratic hold				

Wisconsin State Assembly
Preceded by Solon Johnson	Member of the Wisconsin State Assembly from the Washington 1st district January 6, 1851 – January 5, 1852	Succeeded by Simon D. Powers
Preceded by Charles E. Chamberlain	Member of the Wisconsin State Assembly from the Ozaukee 2nd district January 2, 1854 – January 1, 1855	Succeeded by William H. Ramsey
Preceded by William Vogenitz	Member of the Wisconsin State Assembly from the Ozaukee 2nd district January 5, 1857 – January 4, 1858	Succeeded by Berndt Zastrow-Küssow
Preceded by Berndt Zastrow-Küssow	Member of the Wisconsin State Assembly from the Ozaukee 2nd district January 3, 1859 – January 7, 1861	Succeeded by William F. Opitz
Preceded by James McCarthy	Member of the Wisconsin State Assembly from the Ozaukee County district January 7, 1867 – January 4, 1869	Succeeded by Job Haskell
Preceded by Charles G. Meyer (Ozaukee County district)	Member of the Wisconsin State Assembly from the Ozaukee 2nd district January 1, 1872 – January 6, 1873	Succeeded by Adolphus Zimmermann
Preceded by Adolphus Zimmermann	Member of the Wisconsin State Assembly from the Ozaukee 2nd district January 4, 1875 – January 3, 1876	Succeeded by William Carbys
Preceded by Charles G. Meyer	Member of the Wisconsin State Assembly from the Ozaukee County district January 2, 1882 – January 1, 1883	Succeeded by John J. Race
Preceded by John J. Race	Member of the Wisconsin State Assembly from the Ozaukee County district January 3, 1887 – January 5, 1891	Succeeded by William Henry Fitzgerald
Preceded by Moses M. Strong	Speaker of the Wisconsin State Assembly; 1851 – 1852	Succeeded by James McMillan Shafter
Preceded by Henry L. Palmer	Speaker of the Wisconsin State Assembly; 1854 – 1855	Succeeded by Charles Sholes
Preceded by Gabriel Bouck	Speaker of the Wisconsin State Assembly; 1875 – 1876	Succeeded by Sam Fifield
Wisconsin Senate
New state government	Member of the Wisconsin Senate from the 11th Senate district June 5, 1848 – January 6, 1851	Succeeded by Harvey G. Turner
Preceded by Peter Lochen	Member of the Wisconsin Senate from the 33rd Senate district January 5, 1891 – January 15, 1893	Succeeded by Stephen F. Mayer
Political offices
City incorporated	Mayor of Cedarburg, Wisconsin; April 1885 – April 1892	Succeeded by John F. Bruss
