= William Edwards (Wisconsin politician) =

20th century American politician

W. H. Edwards
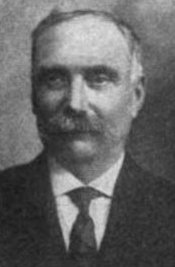

Member of the Wisconsin Senate from the 33rd district
- In office January 5, 1931 – January 7, 1935
- Preceded by: John C. Schumann
- Succeeded by: Chester Dempsey

Member of the Wisconsin State Assembly from the Waukesha 2nd district
- In office January 5, 1925 – January 5, 1931
- Preceded by: Homer Dopp
- Succeeded by: William H. Steele
- In office January 4, 1915 – January 1, 1923
- Preceded by: Judson Hall
- Succeeded by: Homer Dopp

Personal details
- Born: May 14, 1861 Lisbon, Waukesha County, Wisconsin, U.S.
- Died: August 16, 1944 (aged 83) Sussex, Wisconsin, U.S.
- Resting place: Prairie Home Cemetery, Waukesha, Wisconsin
- Party: Republican
- Education: Carroll University
- Occupation: Educator, farmer

William Henry Samuel Edwards (May 14, 1861 – August 16, 1944) was an American educator, farmer, and Republican politician from Waukesha County, Wisconsin. He served four years in the Wisconsin Senate and 14 years in the Wisconsin State Assembly.

== Biography ==
Edwards was born in Lisbon, Waukesha County, Wisconsin. He graduated from what is now Carroll University.

== Career ==
Edwards was elected to the Senate in 1930. Previously, he had been a member of the Assembly from 1915 to 1923 and again from 1925 to 1929. Additionally, he was clerk of Sussex, Wisconsin, as well as chairman of the board of supervisors of Waukesha County.

He died in his home in Sussex, aged 83.

Wisconsin State Assembly
Preceded by Judson Hall	Member of the Wisconsin State Assembly from the Waukesha 2nd district January 4, 1915 – January 1, 1923	Succeeded by Homer Dopp
Preceded by Homer Dopp	Member of the Wisconsin State Assembly from the Waukesha 2nd district January 5, 1925 – January 5, 1931	Succeeded by William H. Steele
Wisconsin Senate
Preceded by John C. Schumann	Member of the Wisconsin Senate from the 33rd district January 5, 1931 – January 7, 1935	Succeeded by Chester Dempsey
