= Wisconsin's Ozaukee County 1st Assembly district =

Former American legislative district

Wisconsin's Ozaukee County 1st State Assembly district
- Obsolete
- Notes: 1852–1861; 1871–1876

Wisconsin's Ozaukee County 1st Assembly district was a district in the Wisconsin State Assembly for several years in the early history of the state of Wisconsin, prior to the legislative redistricting reforms of 1972 which created the current numbered districts. Located in southeast Wisconsin, the district always comprised the northern half of Ozaukee County, Wisconsin. The district was originally known as the Washington County 1st Assembly district prior to the creation of Ozaukee County in 1853.

The district was in use for elections from 1852 to 1860, then again from 1871 to 1875.

== List of representatives ==
List of representatives from the Ozaukee County 1st district
Member	Party	Residence	Term start	Term end	Leg.
District created
James W. Porter	Dem.	Port Washington	January 3, 1853	January 2, 1854	6th
Miles M. Whedon	Whig	Port Washington	January 2, 1854	January 1, 1855	7th
William H. Ramsey	Dem.	Port Washington	January 1, 1855	January 7, 1856	8th
Charles Beger	Dem.	Port Washington	January 7, 1856	January 5, 1857	9th
Samuel A. White	Dem.	Port Washington	January 5, 1857	January 4, 1858	10th
Alexander M. Alling	Dem.	Saukville	January 4, 1858	January 3, 1859	11th
John R. Bohan	Dem.	Port Washington	January 3, 1859	January 2, 1860	12th
Anthony Ahlhauser	Dem.	Saukville	January 2, 1860	January 7, 1861	13th
William H. Ramsey	Dem.	Port Washington	January 7, 1861	January 6, 1862	14th
District abolished by 1861 Wisconsin Act 216; Ozaukee County was consolidated as a single-county Assembly district
District re-established by 1871 Wisconsin Act 156
John R. Bohan	Dem.	Port Washington	January 1, 1872	January 6, 1873	25th
Charles E. Chamberlin	Dem.	Port Washington	January 6, 1873	January 5, 1874	26th
Edward Reed Blake	Dem.	Port Washington	January 5, 1874	January 4, 1875	27th
Gustav Gotze	Lib.R.	Port Washington	January 4, 1875	January 3, 1876	28th
Gustav Gotze	Ref.	Port Washington	January 3, 1876	January 1, 1877	29th
District abolished by 1876 Wisconsin Act 343; Ozaukee County was re-consolidated as a single-county Assembly district
