= Wisconsin's Ozaukee County 2nd Assembly district =

Former American legislative district

Wisconsin's Ozaukee County 2nd State Assembly district
- Obsolete
- Notes: 1852–1861; 1871–1876

Wisconsin's Ozaukee County 2nd Assembly district was a district in the Wisconsin State Assembly for several years in the early history of the state of Wisconsin, prior to the legislative redistricting reforms of 1972 which created the current numbered districts. Located in southeast Wisconsin, the district always comprised the southern half of Ozaukee County, Wisconsin. The district was originally known as the Washington County 2nd Assembly district prior to the creation of Ozaukee County in 1853.

The district was in use for elections from 1852 to 1860, then again from 1871 to 1875.

== List of representatives ==
List of representatives from the Ozaukee County 2nd district
| Member | Party | Residence | Term start | Term end | Leg. |
|---|---|---|---|---|---|
District created
| Charles E. Chamberlain | Dem. | Grafton | January 3, 1853 | January 2, 1854 | 6th |
| Frederick W. Horn | Dem. | Cedarburg | January 2, 1854 | January 1, 1855 | 7th |
| Henry Blazer | Dem. | Mequon | January 1, 1855 | January 7, 1856 | 8th |
| William Vogenitz | Dem. | Cedarburg | January 7, 1856 | January 5, 1857 | 9th |
| Frederick W. Horn | Dem. | Cedarburg | January 5, 1857 | January 4, 1858 | 10th |
| Berndt Zastrow-Küssow | Dem. | Cedarburg | January 4, 1858 | January 3, 1859 | 11th |
| Frederick W. Horn | Dem. | Cedarburg | January 3, 1859 | January 7, 1861 | 12th 13th |
| William F. Opitz | Dem. | Mequon | January 7, 1861 | January 6, 1862 | 14th |
District abolished by 1861 Wisconsin Act 216; Ozaukee County was consolidated as a single-county Assembly district
District re-established by 1871 Wisconsin Act 156
| Frederick W. Horn | Dem. | Cedarburg | January 1, 1872 | January 6, 1873 | 25th |
| Adolphus Zimmermann | Dem. | Mequon | January 6, 1873 | January 4, 1875 | 26th 27th |
| Frederick W. Horn | Ind.R. | Cedarburg | January 4, 1875 | January 3, 1876 | 28th |
| William Carbys | Ind.R. | Mequon | January 3, 1876 | January 1, 1877 | 29th |
District abolished by 1876 Wisconsin Act 343; Ozaukee County was re-consolidated as a single-county Assembly district
