= Alexander M. Alling =

American politician (1807–1893)

Member of the Wisconsin State Assembly from the Ozaukee 1st district
- In office January 4, 1858 – January 3, 1859
- Preceded by: Samuel A. White
- Succeeded by: John R. Bohan

Member of the New York State Assembly from the New York County district
- In office January 1, 1847 – January 1, 1848 Serving with 15 others (multi-member district)

Personal details
- Born: 1807 New York, U.S.
- Died: April 3, 1893 (aged 85–86) Saukville, Wisconsin, U.S.
- Cause of death: Stroke
- Resting place: Saukville Union Cemetery
- Party: Republican (after 1876); Reform (1873–1875); Republican (1869–1873); Free Soil (1850–1854); Democratic (before 1869)
- Spouse: Helen

Alexander M. Alling (1807 – April 3, 1893) was an American farmer, politician, and Wisconsin pioneer. He served one term in the Wisconsin State Assembly representing Ozaukee County during the 1858 legislature. Before settling in Wisconsin, he also served one term in the New York State Assembly, representing New York County in 1847.

In his elected offices, he was a member of the Democratic Party, though he occasionally ran for office as a Free Soiler in the 1850s; he briefly joined the Republicans in 1869, but was an active Granger, so returned to the Democrats in the mid-1870s Reform coalition. He ultimately returned to the Republicans in the late 1870s, and remained a Republican then until his death, making several more unsuccessful bids for office.

== Biography ==
Alexander Alling was born in New York state in 1807.

Alling was very active in politics with the Tammany Hall Democratic Party in the 1840s and early 1850s, and was elected to the New York State Assembly in 1846; he was elected as one of 16 at-large members from New York County serving in the 1847 legislative term. In the 1850s, he participated in activities and stood for office as a Free Soil Democrat, but remained an active member of the Democratic Party, and advocated for Stephen A. Douglas for the U.S. presidency in 1852.

In 1853 he moved to Wisconsin and settled on a farm in the town of Saukville. In Wisconsin he became active again with the Democratic Party, and was active in the Ozaukee County Agricultural Society. He was elected to the Wisconsin State Assembly in 1857 running on the Democratic Party ticket; he represented the northern half of Ozaukee County in the 1858 legislative term. During that legislative term, Alling was chairman of a special committee to investigate the affairs of the Milwaukee & Superior Railroad, part of the sprawling railroad bribery scandal instigated by Byron Kilbourn.

In the late 1860s he associated with the Republican Party and was nominated for Assembly in 1869 as a Republican, losing the general election to Democrat Adolphus Zimmermann. He then ran for Wisconsin Senate in 1870 as an independent, but lost to Democrat Lyman Morgan.

In the tumult of the 1870s, Alling was active with the local Grange movement, a major component of the Reform coalition in Wisconsin. Alling ran for state Assembly again in 1873 as a Reform Democrat, but lost the election to independent Edward Reed Blake.

Alling was back to associating with the Republican Party by 1877. His party changing was likely always driven by personal conviction, as there was no real advantage to being a Republican in Ozaukee County in this era—it was one of the strongest Democratic counties in Wisconsin in the 1870s and 1880s, and when Alling ran for office, he often came in third place behind a regular Democrat and an independent Democrat. In 1881, he was the Republican candidate for Assembly in Ozaukee, but lost the election to Democrat Frederick W. Horn.

In 1885, the Alling farm home burned down; he and his wife—then in their 80s—decided to leave the farm and move into the neighboring village of Saukville. Alling made a final bid for elected office in 1888, running for Assembly again on the Republican Party ticket, but he withdrew from the race before the general election, allegedly in collusion with independent Democrat Fred Horn.

== Personal life and family ==
Alexander M. Alling was married at least once, to a woman named Helen; there were no known children but they may have been adoptive parents of a daughter (Margaret, the wife of John Westcott—Margaret's mother died in 1853 and both Margaret and John were listed as residing at the Alling home in the 1860 census). Interestingly, Helen was frequently mentioned as possessing a cache of old Continental currency paid to her grandfather by George Washington for the delivery of cattle to his army while it was stationed at White Plains, New York; she also owned a pair of candle snuffers that were said to have also been formerly owned by George Washington. Helen died at Saukville in 1891, after a year-long illness.

Alexander Alling died of a stroke on April 3, 1893, about 86 years of age.
