= Charles Mulberger =

American politician (1873–1931)

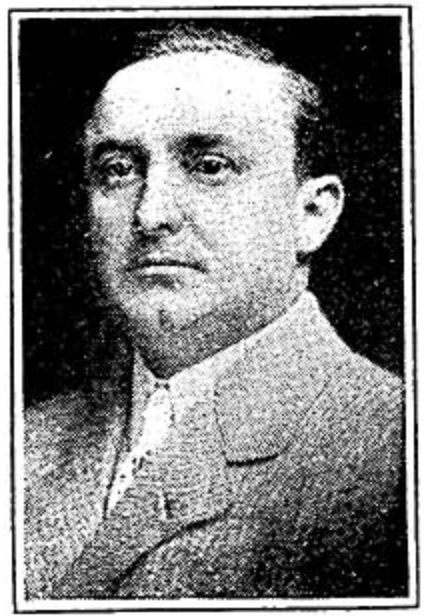

Member of the Wisconsin Senate from the 33rd district
- In office January 4, 1915 – January 1, 1923
- Preceded by: George E. Hoyt
- Succeeded by: John C. Schumann

39th Mayor of Watertown, Wisconsin
- In office April 1916 – April 1920
- Preceded by: Charles A. Kading
- Succeeded by: Herman Wertheimer

Personal details
- Born: November 1, 1873 Watertown, Wisconsin, U.S.
- Died: November 17, 1931 (aged 58) Watertown, Wisconsin, U.S.
- Cause of death: Stroke
- Resting place: Oak Hill Cemetery, Watertown
- Party: Democratic
- Education: University of Wisconsin Law School
- Profession: Lawyer, businessman

Charles Mulberger (November 1, 1873 – November 17, 1931) was an American lawyer, businessman, and Democratic politician from Watertown, Wisconsin. He was the 39th mayor of Waterford and served two terms in the Wisconsin Senate, representing the 33rd Senate district from 1915 to 1923. His father, Henry Mulberger Sr., and two brothers, Henry Jr. and Arthur, also served as mayors of Watertown.

== Background ==
Born in Watertown on November 1, 1873, son of Henry Mulberger Sr. and Mathilda Wolf Mulberger, attended the local public schools and Watertown High School. He graduated from University of Wisconsin Law School in 1894. He was the manager of Global Milling Company for twenty years.

== Public office ==
He served four years on Watertown's Common Council, and four as president of the city fire and police commission, and was mayor of Watertown from 1915 to 1921, a title previously held by his father (Henry Mulberger Sr.) and two of his brothers, Henry Jr. and Arthur (whom he succeeded). In 1914, Mulberger was elected to the Wisconsin State Senate from Wisconsin's 33rd State Senate district (Jefferson and Waukesha counties) as a Democrat, with 5,890 votes, to 5,157 for Republican Frank Foote, 61 for Prohibitionist J. A. McKenzie, and 28 for Socialist Gus. Voight. (Republican incumbent George E. Hoyt was not a candidate.) He was assigned to the standing committee on corporations. He was re-elected in 1918, with 5,294 votes to 1,014 for Socialist George Neu. He moved to the committee on state affairs, and to the committee on committees. He gained statewide attention as the author of the 1919 "Mulberger Act", which provided for enforcement of the Prohibition Amendment, but legalized the sale of near beer with up to 2.75% alcohol content (the latter provision was eventually defeated in court). In 1922, he was defeated by Republican John C. Schumann, who drew 10,865 votes to Mulberger's 3,794.

Mulberger ran once more for mayor of Watertown, but came in third in a tight three-way race, with 1271 votes to 1461 for J. E. McAdams and 1406 for A. H. Hartwig. In 1928, he was the Democratic nominee for Wisconsin Secretary of State, losing to incumbent Republican Theodore Dammann, who drew 627,244 votes to 232,797 for Mulberger, 36,734 for Socialist Leo Krzycki, 6,517 for Prohibitionist W. C. Pickering, and 1,510 for Peter Ordanoff of the Workers' Party.

== Later years ==
Mulberger continued to live in the family home at 311 S. Washington Street (now part of the South Washington Street Historic District). He had suffered a severe stroke in 1927, but continued in the occasional practice of law. He died November 16, 1931, of apoplexy, leaving a widow not named in his obituaries.

Wisconsin Senate
Preceded by George E. Hoyt	Member of the Wisconsin Senate from the 33rd district January 4, 1915 – January 1, 1923	Succeeded by John C. Schumann
Political offices
Preceded by Charles A. Kading	Mayor of Watertown, Wisconsin; April 1916 – April 1920	Succeeded by Herman Wertheimer
