= George F. Hunt =

19th century American physician and politician

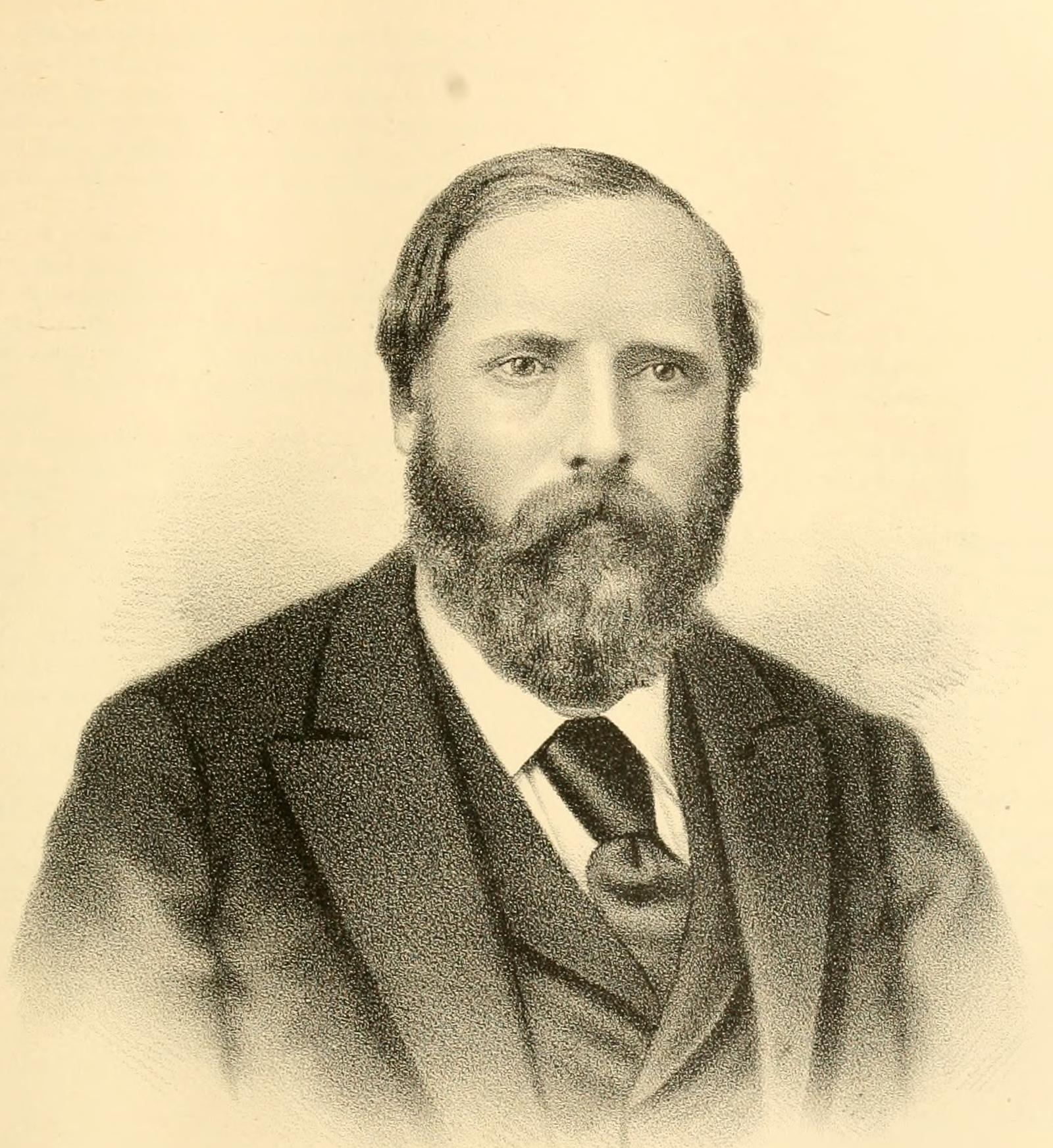
- From History of Washington and Ozaukee counties, Wisconsin (1881)

Member of the Wisconsin Senate from the 33rd district
- In office January 3, 1881 – January 1, 1883
- Preceded by: Lyman Morgan
- Succeeded by: Edward Reed Blake

Personal details
- Born: August 24, 1831 Nichols, New York, U.S.
- Died: December 10, 1888 (aged 57) West Bend, Wisconsin, U.S.
- Cause of death: Stroke
- Resting place: Union Cemetery, West Bend, Wisconsin
- Party: Democratic
- Spouse: Anna E. Salisbury (m. 1865–1888)
- Children: Frederick Salisbury Hunt; (b. 1868; died 1943)
- Education: College of Physicians and Surgeons in New York
- Profession: Physician

George Frederick Hunt (August 24, 1831 – December 10, 1888) was an American medical doctor and politician. He served two years in the Wisconsin State Senate, representing Ozaukee and Washington counties.

== Biography ==
George F. Hunt was born in the town of Nichols, in Tioga County, New York, in August 1831. He attended the Oswego Academy then went on to study at the College of Physicians and Surgeons in New York, where he earned his degree as Doctor of Medicine in 1856. Shortly after graduation, he went west to Wisconsin and started a medical practice at Cambria, Wisconsin, in Columbia County. He remained there for three years before moving to Washington County, Wisconsin, residing first at Barton, then finally settling at West Bend in October 1861. West Bend remained his residence for the rest of his life.

While living at West Bend, he became involved in local affairs, first as president of the Rock River Medical Society, then as district pension surgeon for the Bureau of Pensions in 1864 and 1865. He was appointed postmaster at West Bend in 1869, under the presidency of Ulysses S. Grant, and remained in office until 1877. He was elected president of the village in 1879 and 1880, and was then elected to the Wisconsin State Senate in the Fall of 1880. He served in the 1881 and 1882 sessions, and was not a candidate for re-election in 1882. Through most of his political career, Hunt was a member of the Republican Party, but he became a Democrat in the late 1870s and served in the State Senate as a member of the Democratic caucus.

Hunt suffered a stroke in 1885 and lived in an enfeebled state for the rest of his life. He died from complications from his paralysis in December 1888, at his home in West Bend.

== Personal life and family ==
George F. Hunt was one of at least six children born to Harvey and Mary (née Brown) Hunt.

George F. Hunt married Annie E. Salisbury on October 30, 1865, at Newberg, Wisconsin. Annie was born in the Wisconsin Territory, a daughter of Barton Salisbury, an early settler at Mequon, Wisconsin. George and Annie had one son, Frederick Salisbury Hunt, who became a lawyer in West Bend.

== Electoral history ==
=== Wisconsin Senate (1880) ===
Wisconsin Senate, 33rd District Election, 1880
Party	Candidate	Votes	%	±%
General Election, November 2, 1880
Democratic	George F. Hunt	4,480	58.82%	−5.42%
Independent Democrat	Andrew Schmidt	3,136	41.18%	
Plurality		1,344	17.65%	-10.84%
Total votes		7,616	100.0%	-18.55%
Democratic hold				

Wisconsin Senate
Preceded by Lyman Morgan	Member of the Wisconsin Senate from the 33rd district January 3, 1881 – January 1, 1883	Succeeded by Edward Reed Blake
