= Adam Schantz =

19th-century American politician (1819–1879)

Member of the Wisconsin Senate from the 33rd district
- In office January 6, 1873 – January 4, 1875
- Preceded by: Lyman Morgan
- Succeeded by: Gilead J. Wilmot

Member of the Wisconsin Senate from the 4th district
- In office January 6, 1868 – January 1, 1872
- Preceded by: Frederick Thorpe
- Succeeded by: William Nelson

Member of the Wisconsin State Assembly
- In office January 5, 1863 – January 4, 1864
- Preceded by: Thomas Barry
- Succeeded by: Nicholaus Marx
- Constituency: Washington 1st district
- In office January 2, 1854 – January 1, 1855
- Preceded by: Charles E. Chamberlain
- Succeeded by: Mitchell L. Delaney
- Constituency: Washington 2nd district

Personal details
- Born: October 9, 1819 Kingdom of Bavaria
- Died: November 5, 1879 (aged 60) Juneau, Wisconsin, U.S.
- Resting place: Saint Lawrence Cemetery, St. Lawrence, Wisconsin
- Party: Democratic
- Spouse: Katherine Schwartz (m. 1848–1879)
- Children: Charles F. Schantz^{(b. 1848; died 1918)}; Joseph J. Schantz^{(b. 1850; died 1907)}; Josephine (Heder)^{(b. 1852; died 1929)}; Katherina K. Schantz^{(b. 1858; died 1860 )}

Adam Schantz (October 9, 1819 – November 5, 1879) was an American immigrant, farmer, and Democratic politician. He served six years in the Wisconsin State Senate and two years in the State Assembly, representing Washington County.

== Biography ==
Schantz was born on October 9, 1819, in the Kingdom of Bavaria. He moved with his family to the United States in 1828, settling in Oneida County, New York. After living for a time in Oswego County, New York, the family moved to Washington County, Wisconsin, in 1846. Schantz later lived in Addison, Wisconsin, and Oak Grove, Dodge County, Wisconsin. In 1848, he married Catharine Schwartz, who was also a native of Bavaria. They had four children. He moved to Schleisingerville, Wisconsin, (now Slinger) in 1874. Schantz died in 1879.

== Career ==
Schantz was elected Justice of the Peace in what is now Hartford, Wisconsin, in 1846 and Register of Deeds of Washington County in 1852. He served two terms in the Assembly before serving in the Senate from 1868 to 1874. Schantz was a Democrat.

== See also ==
- The Political Graveyard

Wisconsin State Assembly
Preceded by Charles E. Chamberlain	Member of the Wisconsin State Assembly from the Washington 2nd district January 2, 1854 – January 1, 1855	Succeeded by Mitchell L. Delaney
Preceded by Thomas Barry	Member of the Wisconsin State Assembly from the Washington 1st district January 5, 1863 – January 4, 1864	Succeeded by Nicholaus Marx
Wisconsin Senate
Preceded by Frederick Thorpe	Member of the Wisconsin Senate from the 4th district January 6, 1868 – January 1, 1872	Succeeded by William Nelson
Preceded by Lyman Morgan	Member of the Wisconsin Senate from the 33rd district January 6, 1873 – January 4, 1875	Succeeded by Gilead J. Wilmot
