= Berndt Zastrow-Küssow =

American politician (1802–1872)

B. O. Zastrow Küssow

Member of the Wisconsin State Assembly from the Ozaukee 2nd district
- In office January 4, 1858 – January 3, 1859
- Preceded by: Frederick W. Horn
- Succeeded by: Frederick W. Horn

Personal details
- Born: Berndt Otto Gottlieb von Zastrow genannt von Küssow; February 20, 1802 Klein Küssow, Pomerania, Kingdom of Prussia
- Died: July 17, 1872 (aged 70) Port Washington, Wisconsin, U.S.
- Resting place: Union Cemetery, Port Washington
- Party: Democratic
- Spouse: Ottilie Henriette Erdmuthe von Papstein (m. 1826–1872)
- Children: Agatha Henriette (von Knobelsdorf)^{(b. 1827; died 1865)}; Lucie Gottliebe (Lipman)^{(b. 1827; died 1904)}; Friedrich Wolfgang Ernst von Zastrow-Küssow^{(b. 1832; died 1910)}; Alexander von Zastrow-Küssow^{(b. 1834; died 1903)}; Helena von Zastrow-Küssow^{(b. 1836; died 1903)}; Walther Gottlieb von Zastrow-Küssow^{(b. 1837; died 1912)}; Berndt Heinrich Wilhelm von Zastrow-Küssow^{(b. 1839; died 1919)}; Pauline Ottilie Toska Gottliebe (Meinecke)^{(b. 1841; died 1912)}; Margaretha Katharina Gottliebe von Zastrow-Küssow^{(b. 1845; died 1847)}
- Parents: Friedrich von Zastrow genannt von Küssow (father); Henriette Friederike Wilhelmina von Unruh (mother)

Berndt Otto Gottlieb von Zastrow-Küssow (February 20, 1802 – July 17, 1872) was a German American immigrant, Democratic politician, and Wisconsin pioneer. He was a prominent citizen in the early history of Ozaukee County, Wisconsin, and represented Ozaukee County in the Wisconsin State Assembly during the 11th Wisconsin Legislature (1858). His name was sometimes abbreviated as B. O. Zastrow Küssow.

== Biography ==
Berndt Zastrow-Küssow was born Berndt Otto Gottlieb von Zastrow genannt von Küssow, at his father's estate in Klein Küssow, in 1802. At the time of his birth, this area was part of the Province of Pomerania in the Kingdom of Prussia—the area is now part of northwest Poland.

He was born into the Prussian nobility; his father, Friedrich von Zastrow, was a member of the Zastrow family of Pomerania, whose lineage can be traced back to the 13th century. His father had inherited the estate in Klein Küssow from a great aunt of the Küssow family, and in taking ownership of the estate, he was obligated to also adopt the "von Küssow" surname for himself and his heirs.

Berndt Zastrow-Küssow was raised and educated in Prussia and inherited his father's estate as a young man. The estate was a financial burden in the difficult economic climate in Pomerania after the Napoleonic Wars. His problems were exacerbated after the failure of the German revolutions of 1848–1849, when the Prussian monarchy instituted punitive reforms to curtail the independence of the lesser nobility. Unable to sustain his debts, Zastrow-Küssow sold off the family estates and left the country; he first went to London for a year, then emigrated to the United States.

He initially settled in Milwaukee County, Wisconsin, but a year later relocated north to the town of Grafton in Ozaukee County, Wisconsin. Historical accounts said that he initially struggled to adapt to the self-reliant life of a private farmer, but found success in cattle raising. He was one of the original officers of the Ozaukee County Agricultural Society, and was the originator of livestock fairs in the village of Saukville.

Politically, Zastrow-Küssow affiliated with the Democratic Party. He held local office as a justice of the peace and made an unsuccessful run for county judge. In 1857, he was the Democratic nominee for Wisconsin State Assembly in Ozaukee County's 2nd Assembly district—which comprised the southern half of the county. He won the election and went on to serve in the 11th Wisconsin Legislature. He remained active with the Democratic Party throughout the American Civil War.

== Personal life and family ==
Berndt Zastrow-Küssow was the eldest of three known children of Friedrich von Zastrow genannt von Küssow and his wife Henriette Friederike Wilhelmina von Unruh. His mother's family, the Unruh family, were also notable Prussian nobility in the Silesia region.

Berndt Zastrow-Küssow married Ottilie Henriette Erdmuthe von Papstein on May 18, 1826. They had nine children together, though one died in infancy.

Their son Alexander was a merchant and hotelier, and operated the American House hotel in Port Washington, Wisconsin.

Another son, Walter, served in the Union Army with the 1st Minnesota Infantry Regiment, then later was commissioned a captain in the 52nd Wisconsin Infantry Regiment. After returning to Wisconsin, he served in local office, and was elected register of deeds on the Democratic ticket.

Zastrow-Küssow died at his home on Port Washington on July 17, 1872.

Wisconsin State Assembly
Preceded by Frederick W. Horn	Member of the Wisconsin State Assembly from the Ozaukee 2nd district January 4, 1858 – January 3, 1859	Succeeded by Frederick W. Horn
