= Lannon, Wisconsin =

- Village
- Location of Lannon in Waukesha County, Wisconsin.
- Coordinates: 43°9′1″N 88°9′52″W
- Country: United States
- State: Wisconsin
- County: Waukesha

Area
  - Total: 2.49 sq mi (6.45 km^{2})
  - Land: 2.47 sq mi (6.40 km^{2})
  - Water: 0.019 sq mi (0.05 km^{2})
- Elevation: 915 ft (279 m)

Population (2020)
  - Total: 1,355
  - Density: 498.3/sq mi (192.41/km^{2})
- Time zone: UTC-6 (Central (CST))
  - Summer (DST): UTC-5 (CDT)
- ZIP Code: 53046
- Area code: 262
- FIPS code: 55-42450
- GNIS feature ID: 1567839
- Website: www.villageoflannon.com

Lannon is a village in Waukesha County, Wisconsin, United States. The population was 1,355 at the 2020 census. Lannon is a part of the Milwaukee metropolitan area.

== History ==
The village is named for William Lannon, who settled here with his bride in 1834. The area was granted the postal designation of "Lannon" in 1890. In 1930 the Village of Lannon was incorporated out of parts of the Town of Menomonee.

=== Lannon stone ===
Lannon stone, a type of limestone or dolomite, is named for the town, as it was quarried here. John Halquist built one of the state's largest stone companies from Lannon stone first in Sussex, Wisconsin, and then in several locations.

Lannon stone was the major source of stone for many cities in Wisconsin and for Chicago. It was widely used to provide a stone veneer on bridges.

Lannon stone is variously asserted to be limestone rather than dolomite, or to be limestone which is also known as dolomite. Menonomee Park has been described as an excellent place to photograph Lannon stone.

== Geography ==
Lannon is located at 43°9′1″N 88°9′52″W (43.150288, −88.164568).

According to the United States Census Bureau, the village has a total area of 2.46 square miles (6.37 km^{2}), of which 2.44 square miles (6.32 km^{2}) is land and 0.02 square miles (0.05 km^{2}) is water.

== Demographics ==
Historical population
Census	Pop.	Note	%±
1930	434		—
1940	378		−12.9%
1950	438		15.9%
1960	1,084		147.5%
1970	1,056		−2.6%
1980	987		−6.5%
1990	924		−6.4%
2000	1,009		9.2%
2010	1,107		9.7%
2020	1,355		22.4%
U.S. Decennial Census

=== 2020 Census ===
At the 2020 census, there were 1,355 people, 573 households living in the village There were 598 housing units at an average density of 249.16 per square mile (93.44/km^{2}). The racial make-up was 87.8% White, 1.2 % African American, .5 % Native American, 4.3 % Asian, .5 % from other races and 5.6 % from two or more races. Hispanic or Latino of any race were 2.9 % of the population.

There were 573 households, of which 21% had children under the age of 18 living with them, 50.4% were married couples living together, 21.1% had a female householder with no husband present. 28% of all households were made up of individuals, and 11.4 % had someone living alone who was 65 years of age or older

23.5 % of the population were under the age of 18, 59.7 % from 18 to 64, and 16.8 % were 65 years of age or older. The median age was 44.3 years.

The median household income was $ 75,675 and the median family income was $ 119,688. About 5.4 % of the population were below the poverty line, including 12.9% of those under age 18 and 10.7% of those age 65 or over.

Of the population 25 years and older, 14.1% have a high school diploma or equivalent. 43% have a degree of some sort, with 12.6% having an associate degree, 25% having a bachelor’s degree, and 10.4% having a graduate or professional degree.

=== 2010 census ===
At the 2010 census, there were 1,107 people, 479 households and 314 families living in the village. The population density was 453.7 per square mile (175.2/km^{2}). There were 517 housing units at an average density of 211.9 per square mile (81.8/km^{2}). The racial make-up was 94.8% White, 1.0% African American, 0.6% Native American, 0.5% Asian, 1.7% from other races and 1.4% from two or more races. Hispanic or Latino of any race were 4.0% of the population.

There were 479 households, of which 26.5% had children under the age of 18 living with them, 48.6% were married couples living together, 10.0% had a female householder with no husband present, 6.9% had a male householder with no wife present, and 34.4% were non-families. 29.2% of all households were made up of individuals, and 8.8% had someone living alone who was 65 years of age or older. The average household size was 2.31 and the average family size was 2.82.

The median age was 43.2 years. 21.1% of residents were under the age of 18; 5.7% were between the ages of 18 and 24; 25.4% were from 25 to 44; 33.1% were from 45 to 64; and 14.7% were 65 years of age or older. The gender make-up was 50.1% male and 49.9% female.

=== 2000 census ===
At the 2000 census, there were 1,009 people, 425 households and 282 families living in the village. The population density was 413.0 per square mile (159.5/km^{2}). There were 434 housing units at an average density of 177.7 per square mile (68.6/km^{2}). The racial make-up was 97.92% White, 0.50% African American, 0.40% Native American, 0.10% Asian, 0.10% from other races and 0.99% from two or more races. Hispanic or Latino of any race were 1.59% of the population.

There were 425 households, of which 27.1% had children under the age of 18 living with them, 55.3% were married couples living together, 6.4% had a female householder with no husband present, and 33.6% were non-families. 29.2% of all households were made up of individuals, and 9.4% had someone living alone who was 65 years of age or older. The average household size was 2.37 and the average family size was 2.95.

22.9% of the population were under the age of 18, 5.9% from 18 to 24, 29.8% from 25 to 44, 27.8% from 45 to 64, and 13.5% who were 65 years of age or older. The median age was 40 years. For every 100 females, there were 110.6 males. For every 100 females age 18 and over, there were 104.2 males.

The median household income was $44,375 and the median family income was $54,107. Males had a median income of $36,250 and females $25,583. The per capita income was $21,041. About 4.4% of families and 6.1% of the population were below the poverty line, including 8.7% of those under age 18 and 8.4% of those age 65 or over.

== Education ==
Most of Lannon is zoned to the Hamilton School District. A portion of Lannon is in the Menomonee Falls School District. The former operates Hamilton High School and the latter district operates Menomonee Falls High School.

== Religion ==
St. John's Lutheran Church is a church of the Wisconsin Evangelical Lutheran Synod in Lannon.

== Miscellaneous ==
Joecks Field in Lannon was the site of ESPN's first live broadcast, a softball game between the Kentucky Bourbons and the Milwaukee Schlitz.
