= Peter Lochen =

19th century American politician

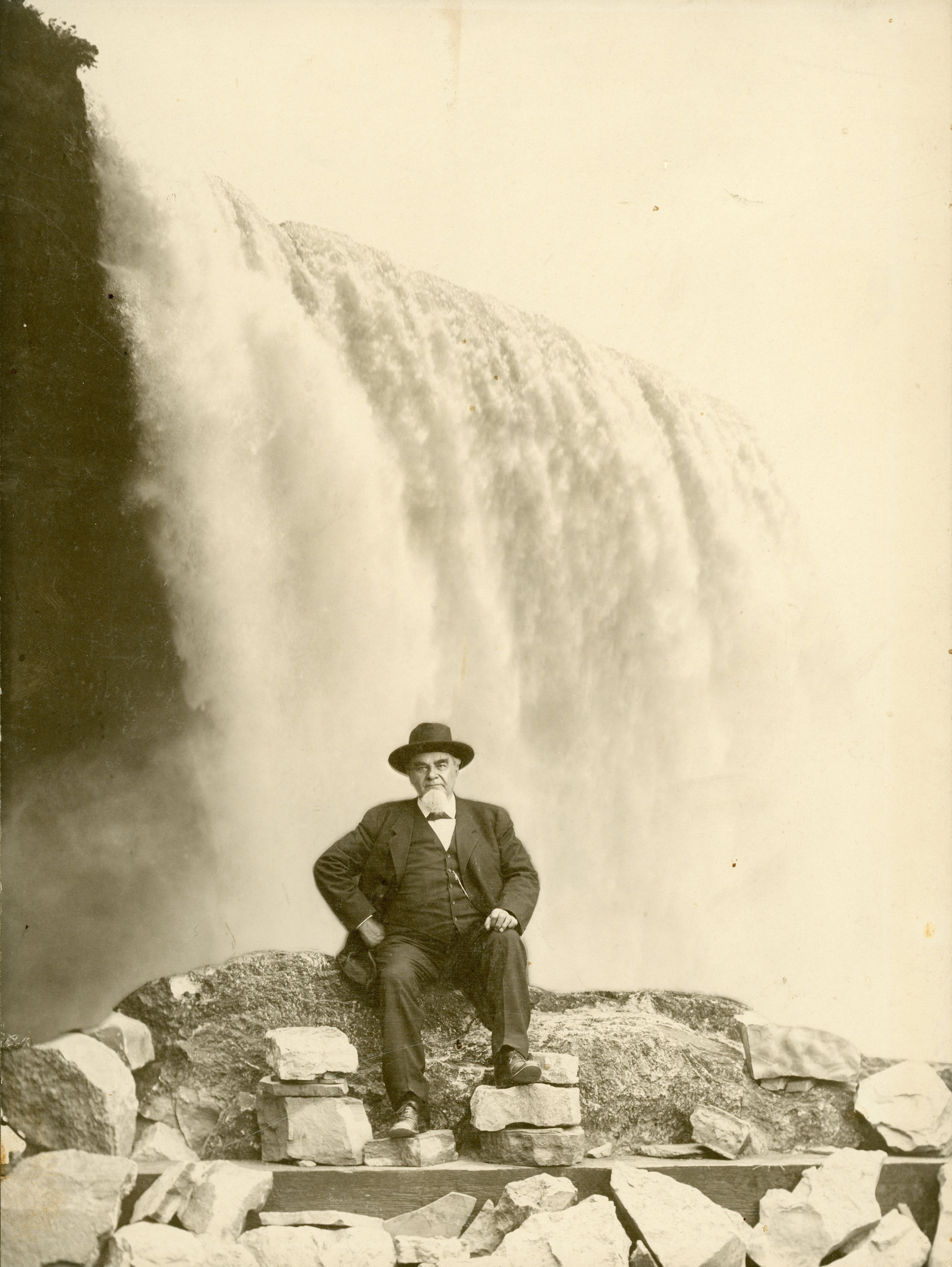
- Peter Lochen Sr. at Niagara Falls, NY.

Member of the Wisconsin Senate from the 33rd district
- In office January 3, 1887 – January 5, 1891
- Preceded by: Edward Reed Blake
- Succeeded by: Frederick W. Horn

Personal details
- Born: June 27, 1840 Trier, Rhine Province, Kingdom of Prussia
- Died: November 25, 1924 (aged 84) Newburg, Wisconsin, U.S.
- Resting place: Holy Trinity Cemetery, Newburg, Wisconsin
- Party: Democratic
- Spouse: Susanna Schwinn (m. 1867; died 1913)
- Children: Peter J. Lochen^{(b. 1868; died 1954)}; Susanna (Julie)^{(b. 1869; died 1959)}; Mary Ann (Hansen)^{(b. 1871; died 1952)}; Margaret Lochen^{(b. 1873; died 1920)}; Angeline (Boffer)^{(b. 1876; died 1900)}; Mathias Lochen^{(b. 1879; died 1956)}; Robert J. Lochen^{(b. 1880; died 1975)}; Maria Helena (Miller)^{(b. 1882; died 1962)}; Eleonora H. (Kocher)^{(b. 1884; died 1974)}; Johannes Jackobus Lochen^{(b. 1885; died 1970)}; Frank Joseph Lochen^{(b. 1886; died 1963)}
- Occupation: Farmer

Peter Lochen (June 27, 1840 – November 25, 1924) was a German American immigrant, farmer, and politician. He was a member of the Wisconsin State Senate, representing Washington and Ozaukee counties during the 1887 and 1889 sessions.

== Biography ==
Peter Lochen was born June 27, 1840, in the Rhine Province of the Kingdom of Prussia (now western Germany). He was raised and educated in Europe, then emigrated to the United States with his parents, landing at Milwaukee in 1860. The family purchased a tract of land in the town of Trenton, Washington County, Wisconsin, which they cultivated into a farm.

He was elected town treasurer in 1869, 1870, 1879, and 1880, and was chairman of the town board from 1881 through 1886. As chairman of the town board, he was also ex officio a member of the Washington County board of supervisors. He was elected to the Wisconsin State Senate in 1886 without opposition, running on the Democratic Party ticket. He served a four-year term and was not a candidate for re-election in 1890.

After leaving the Senate, he was appointed deputy collector of internal revenue for his district in 1892 and served four years in that role. Then, in 1898, he was appointed superintendent of the Washington County Asylum for the Chronic Insane, which he managed until his retirement in 1912.

Peter Lochen died in Newburg, Wisconsin, in November 1924.

== Personal life and family ==
Peter Lochen was the second of five children born to Anton Lochen and his wife Angeline (née Howen). The Lochens were German Catholics and the entire family emigrated to Wisconsin. Anton Lochen had served in the Prussian Army before leaving the country.

Peter Lochen married Susanna Schwinn of Milwaukee. Her parents were also pioneer immigrants in Wisconsin from the Rhine Province. Her maternal grandfather was Peter Basch, who ran the first German Catholic school in Milwaukee. Peter and Susanna Lochen had eleven children, nine of whom survived their parents.

Wisconsin Senate
Preceded by Edward Reed Blake	Member of the Wisconsin Senate from the 33rd district January 3, 1887 – January 5, 1891	Succeeded by Frederick W. Horn
