= Lyman Morgan =

American politician (1814–1896)

Member of the Wisconsin Senate from the 33rd district
- In office January 1, 1879 – January 1, 1881
- Preceded by: Philip Schneider
- Succeeded by: George F. Hunt
- In office January 1, 1872 – January 1, 1873
- Preceded by: Satterlee Clark Jr.
- Succeeded by: Adam Schantz

Member of the Wisconsin Senate from the 3rd district
- In office January 1, 1865 – January 1, 1872
- Preceded by: John R. Bohan
- Succeeded by: Francis Huebschmann

Personal details
- Born: April 23, 1814 Wyoming County, Pennsylvania
- Died: September 17, 1896 (aged 82) Port Washington, Wisconsin
- Resting place: Union Cemetery; Port Washington, Wisconsin
- Party: Democratic
- Spouse: married 3 times
- Children: at least 1 daughter

Lyman Morgan (April 23, 1814 – September 17, 1896) was an American Democratic politician. He represented Ozaukee County for ten years in the Wisconsin State Senate (1865–1873 and 1879–1881).

== Biography ==
Lyman Morgan was born in Wyoming County, Pennsylvania. He was educated there and was trained in manufacturing. He came to the Wisconsin Territory in 1847—the year before its admission to the Union—and settled at Port Washington, where he resided for the rest of his life. He was elected to the Wisconsin State Senate from the 3rd senatorial district in 1864 and was re-elected in 1866, 1868 and 1870. In 1872, the legislative redistricting enacted in 1871 (1871 Wis. Act 156) moved him into the 33rd district. He did not run for re-election in 1872, but was elected again from the 33rd district in 1878. In addition to his terms in the senate, Morgan was chairman of the Town Board of Supervisors of Port Washington.

Morgan died on September 17, 1896, at his home in Port Washington and was interred at the city's Union Cemetery.

Wisconsin Senate
Preceded by John R. Bohan	Member of the Wisconsin Senate from the 3rd district January 1, 1865 – January 1, 1872	Succeeded by Francis Huebschmann
Preceded by Satterlee Clark Jr.	Member of the Wisconsin Senate from the 33rd district January 1, 1872 – January 1, 1873	Succeeded by Adam Schantz
Preceded by Philip Schneider	Member of the Wisconsin Senate from the 33rd district January 1, 1879 – January 1, 1881	Succeeded by George F. Hunt
