= Sugar Run Dolomite =

Geological formation in Illinois, US

- Stratigraphic range: Silurian
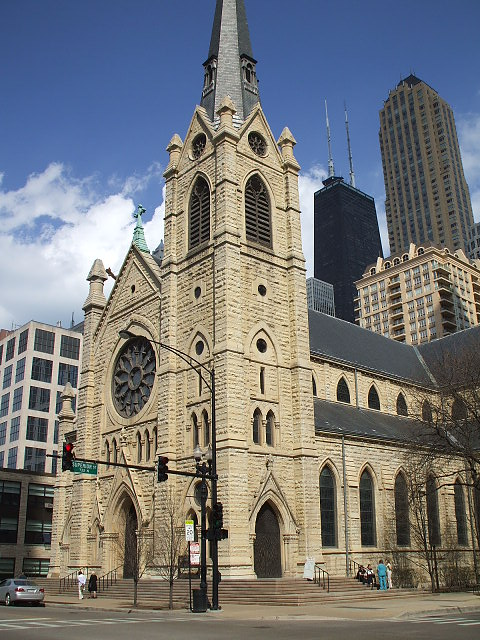
- Chicago's Holy Name Cathedral, made of Sugar Run Dolomite, aka "Athens marble" or "Lemont limestone"
- Type: Formation

Lithology
- Primary: dolomite

Location
- Region: Illinois
- Country: United States

Type section
- Named for: Sugar Run Stream

The Sugar Run Dolomite is a geologic formation in Illinois. It is a finely-bedded dolomite, preserving fossils dating back to the Silurian period. This formation is named for the Sugar Run stream in Joliet, along which it is well exposed. The dolomite is off-white/grey on freshly cut surfaces but over time oxidizes to a distinctive cream yellow color due to trace presence of iron. It is a member of the Niagaran series.

== Use in architecture ==
This formation has been quarried for building material since the mid-19th century, sometimes sold under the trade name of "Athens marble", a name associated with the early settlement of Lemont, once known as the Town of Athens. It is also known as Joliet or Lemont limestone.

The opening of the Illinois and Michigan Canal in 1848 enabled limestone from the Lemont and Joliet quarries to be transported cheaply to Chicago markets, significantly expanding its use in construction. It was used extensively in the construction of civic, religious, and residential buildings in Chicago from the 1850s-1880s. By the 1890s, it fell out of favor as a building material as Indiana limestone became more widely used.

Notable structures constructed from Sugar Run Dolomite include the Chicago Water Tower, Holy Name Cathedral, St. James Cathedral, Second Presbyterian Church, Rosehill Cemetery, and the Union Stock Yard Gate.

== See also ==
- List of fossiliferous stratigraphic units in Illinois
- Lannon stone
