= Hamilton School District =

School district in Wisconsin, United States

Address
- W220n6151 Town Line Rd Sussex, Wisconsin, 53089; United States

District information
- Grades: PK–12
- Schools: 8
- NCES District ID: 5506030

Students and staff
- Students: 5,119 (2023–24)
- Teachers: 314.64 (on an FTE basis)
- Student–teacher ratio: 16.27

Other information
- Website: www.hamilton.k12.wi.us

The Hamilton School District is a school district in Waukesha County, Wisconsin, United States.

It serves all of Butler, most of Lannon and Sussex, parts of Lisbon and Menomonee Falls, and a small part of Pewaukee.

Established as a K-12 school district in 1961, Hamilton serves a 36-square-mile (93 km^{2}) area of suburban and rural communities about 15 miles (24 km) north and west of downtown Milwaukee. The population is estimated at 40,000. Student enrollment is approximately 5,000.

== School sites in the district ==
The Hamilton School District has eight schools that serve students from pre-kindergarten through high school:

=== 4-year-old kindergarten ===
An optional half-day kindergarten program is offered to 4-year-olds at Willow Springs Learning Center. Willow Springs also houses a private daycare provider, enabling parents to pay for daycare services for their children during the portion of the day when they are not participating in the kindergarten program.

=== Elementary schools ===
The four elementary schools focus on the basic skills of reading, writing, mathematics, science and social studies. Each school has a full-time reading-writing specialist and library-media specialist. Specialists also provide instruction in art, music and physical education. Guidance counselors offer a developmental guidance program. The Hamilton School District has four elementary schools that serve students from kindergarten through fourth grade.

=== Intermediate school ===
Silver Spring Intermediate School is a newly added addition to the growing Hamilton School District that now holds grades 5 and 6, with elementary schools serving students in 5K - grade 4. It was formally dedicated in a public ceremony on Aug. 26, 2019, on the school's grounds.

=== Middle school ===
It was named for two consecutive years as a “middle school of excellence” by the state Wisconsin Department of Public Instruction and the Association of Wisconsin School Administrators. Templeton uses a house system, which groups students with a core team of academic teachers who collaboratively plan instruction, teach and meet student needs. The structure promotes interdisciplinary instruction, integrated units, team teaching, positive student-teacher relationships and flexible scheduling.

=== High school ===
Hamilton High School has a program that serves college-bound students (98.5% graduation rate), as well as those who plan to attend technical school or enter the world of work. The school has advanced placement and world language courses and an honors program. Co-op and youth apprenticeship programs allow students to apply theory to real world work settings.

=== Schools ===
name	Grades
Willow Springs Learning Center	K3-K4
Lannon Elementary School	K-4
Maple Avenue Elementary School	K-4
Marcy Elementary School	K-4
Woodside Elementary School	K-4
Sliver Spring Intermediate School	5-6
Templeton Middle School	7-8
Hamilton High School	9-12

== School Board ==
Seven Hamilton School Board members are elected to serve three-year terms. While placed in office by a vote of the entire district, members are elected from five specified district areas and two at-large positions.

Meetings are the first Tuesday (curriculum meeting) and the third Monday (regular meeting) each month. The agenda is posted and submitted to local newspapers prior to each meeting.

Name	Area Represented	Term Expires
Brian Schneider, President	Menomonee Falls	2027
Rachel Ziemer, Vice President	At-large	2028
John Castillo, Treasurer	Butler	2027
Dawn Van Aacken, Clerk	Lisbon	2027
Tom Seiler	At-large	2029
Jay Jones	Lannon	2029
Ashlie Schaffner	Sussex	2028
