= Peter Turck =

American politician

Peter Turck often misspelled Turek (c. 1798 - ?) was an American farmer from Mequon, Wisconsin who served a single one-year term as a member of the Wisconsin State Assembly.

== Background ==
When Turck joined the Assembly in January 1849, he was reported to be 50 years old, from New York state, and to have been in Wisconsin for eleven years.

== Public affairs ==
On June 15, 1841, Turck was designated as a delegate from Washington County to the upcoming Whig territorial convention.

In March 1842, Turck was appointed by James Duane Doty, Whig governor of Wisconsin Territory, as a justice of the peace for Washington County (which at that time included a larger territory, including what is now Ozaukee County. Turck was elected in 1848 to represent the 3rd Washington County Assembly district (the Towns of Mequon and Germantown) as a Democrat, succeeding fellow Democrat Adolphus Zimmermann, for the 1849 term (2nd Wisconsin Legislature). He would not be elected in 1850, but all the Assemblymen from Washington County in 1850 were Democrats.

== Later life ==
There was a Peter Turck who was politically active in nearby Milwaukee in the 1850s, but there is no evidence whether this was the same person; nor whether he was the same Peter Turck whose insanity embroiled him in a lawsuit in Milwaukee in February 1868.
