= Linum (village) =

- Municipality of Fehrbellin
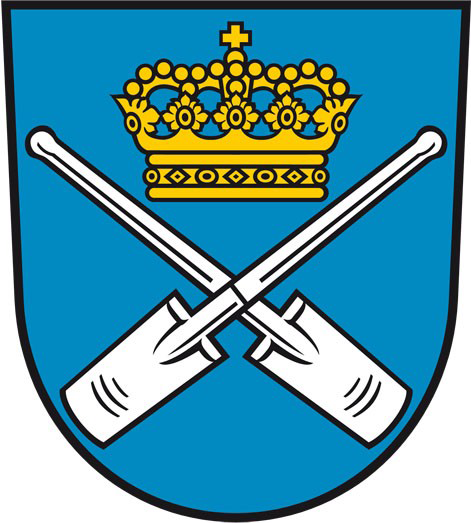
- Coat of arms
- Nickname: Storchendorf
- Interactive map of Linum

Area
  - Total: 2,665 ha (6,590 acres)
- Elevation: 33 m (108 ft)

Population
  - Total: 750
  - Density: 28/km^{2} (73/sq mi)
- Time zone: UTC+1 (CET)
- Postal code: 16833
- Phone prefix: 033922

Linum is a village of the municipality Fehrbellin in the Ostprignitz-Ruppin district of Brandenburg, Germany. It is sometimes called the "stork village" (Storchendorf) of Linum.

== History ==
Linum is first mentioned in 1294 as part of the Diocese of Havelberg. It is on the Berlin-Wilsnack Pilgrimage Route, which began at the end of the 14th century.

Linum was previously a peat mining town, and during this time, had as many as 2,500 residents. Peat was shipped to Berlin from the port via the Amtmann's canal aboard barges through several shipping companies.

=== Incorporation ===
Linum was incorporated into Fehrbellin in 2003.

== Tourism ==
Linum has a pond area with 240 hectares of water, which come from peat-covered areas. Many stork pairs annually breed there, granting Linum's "Stork village" nickname. During the fall, hundreds of thousands of cranes and geese stop nearby during their migration to the south.

=== Sightseeing ===
==== The Linum Village Church ====
The neogothic church was built in 1867/68 and contains a large amount of a previous stone church. During the era of peat mining, it was no longer sufficiently large enough to accommodate the population. The roof and gables of the church also house storks.

== Notable locals ==
- Joachim Betke (1601–1663), theologian
- Christian Hoburg (1607–1675), theologian
- Ernst Bahr, German politician and member of the Social Democratic Party of Germany; began his career as a teacher in Linum
- Luise Hensel, religious author and poet
- Frederick W. Horn, Wisconsin legislator, politician and lawyer
