= Hamilton High School (Wisconsin) =

Secondary school in Wisconsin, United States

Coordinates: 43.12869°N 88.18763°W

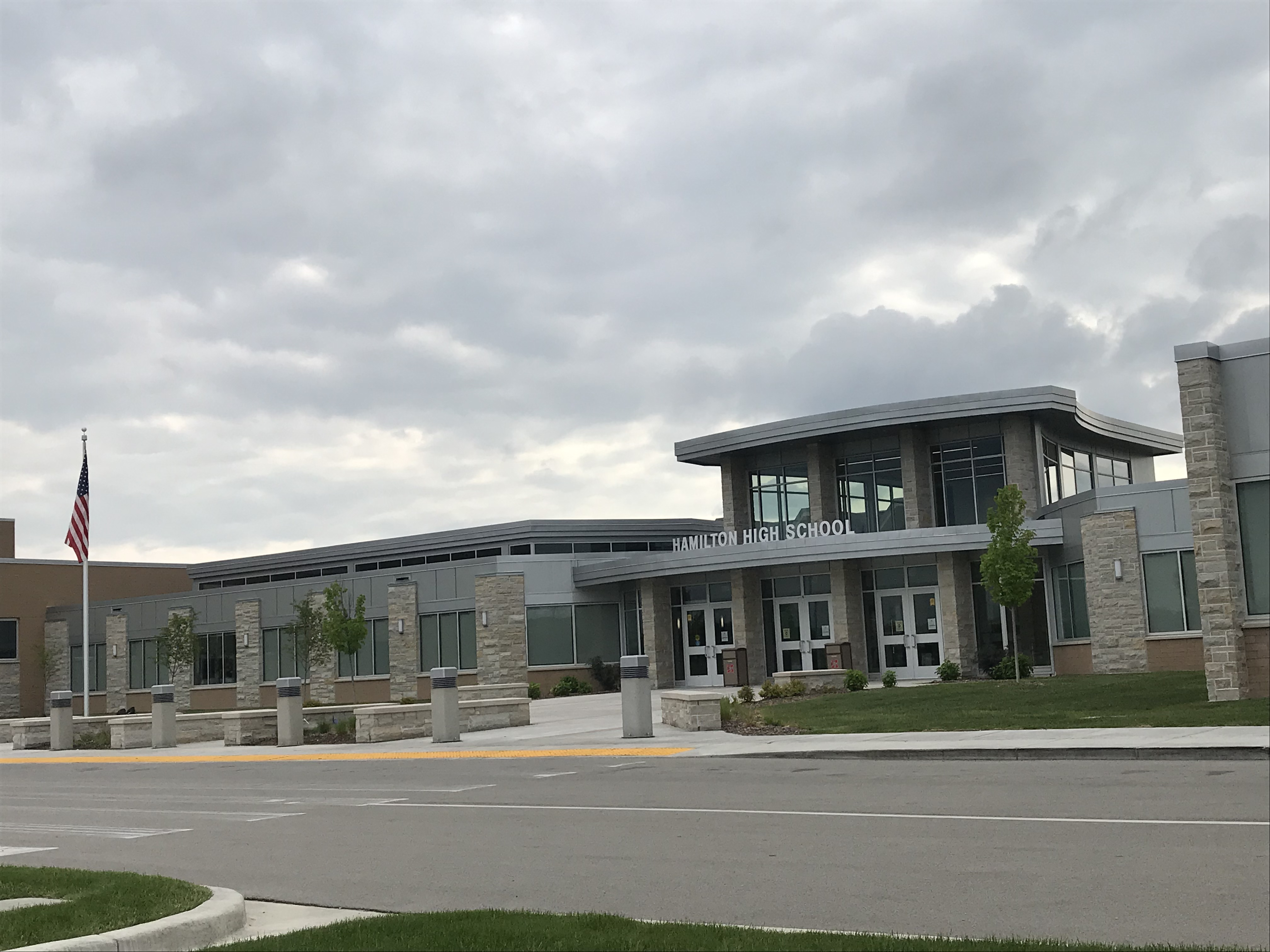

Location
- W220N6151 Town Line Road; Sussex, (Waukesha County), Wisconsin 53089; United States

Information
- Type: Public high school
- Established: 07/14/1962
- School district: The Hamilton School District
- Principal: Dominic Bauer
- Teaching staff: 90.71 (FTE)
- Enrollment: 1,564 (2024-2025)
- Student to teacher ratio: 17.24
- Colors: Red and Black
- Athletics conference: Greater Metro
- Nickname: Chargers
- Yearbook: Lance

Hamilton High School is a public high school in the Village of Sussex that serves multiple southeastern Wisconsin communities. Hamilton High School is part of the Hamilton School District.

It serves all of Butler, Lannon, Sussex, parts of Lisbon and Menomonee Falls, and a small part of Pewaukee.

== Recent events ==
=== Club America controversy ===
Hamilton came under fire for suspending multiple students for taking down or marking posters for the chapter of Club America, which is the high school form of Turning Point USA. The club was unanimously voted down by the student council. The student body had not been informed that Principal Dominic Bauer had overturned the student council’s decision and some assumed the club did not exist and was confused. He did not inform the student council until multiple weeks after and a news article was put out shortly after. Bauer said in an interview with TMJ4 said he considered taking down or defacing a poster as “severe vandalism or harassment”.

=== Threats ===
On November 12, 2025, a former Hamilton student made a shooting threat against the school. He was charged with making terrorist threats. According to an email to Hamilton parents, the Waukesha County Sheriff's Department would have an increased presence at the school the next week.

== History ==
The school was completed July 14, 1962. It was named in honor of one of America’s founding fathers and signer of the Constitution, Alexander Hamilton. It opened for freshman and sophomores assigned to the new high school from surrounding areas such as Pewaukee, Hartland, Merton, Germantown, Menomonee Falls, Brookfield, Wauwatosa, Butler, and Waukesha. A class was added each year until the first senior class graduated in 1965.

In 1964, more classrooms were added, and again in 1970; in 1996, a science wing was added; in 2004, the 35,000-square-foot Hamilton Fine Arts Center was added. In 2006, a federal grant funded a fitness center with over 35 machines. In 2008, the gym was redone with new bleachers, and the floor was refurbished. In 2012, a video scoreboard was added. In 2014 an indoor training facility was finished, and in 2016, a wing was added to relocate the history classrooms and reorganize the rest of the classrooms. In 2019, the new communication arts wing was added as well as an extension to the administrative and district offices, and most recently the expansion of the cafeteria in 2025.

== Fine Arts Center ==
The 35,000-square-foot (3,300 m^{2}) Hamilton Fine Arts Center seats 800 people. It contains a full-fly stage, orchestra pit for live musical accompaniment, ticket booth, dressing rooms, new music rooms, costume-prop storage, control booth, and an art display in the lobby.

== Curriculum ==
Hamilton High School offers honors classes and AP courses. Many departments also have connections with area businesses, providing students the opportunity to participate in co-operative learning experiences. For credit-deficient students, the P.A.S.S. and G.A.P. individualized course programs are offered. The school is accredited by AdvancED.

=== Graphic arts ===
Students can work with screen printing and offset printing. The graphics lab has two single-color offset presses, one digital two-color press, two darkrooms, a camera, a straight to film printer, and a guillotine paper cutter.

== Extracurricular activities ==
=== FIRST Robotics ===
Hamilton's FIRST Robotics Competition team is known as "Charger Robotics" and "Team 537". Team 537 is composed of four component design teams. The mechanical team builds the mechanical pieces of the robot, such as the chassis and drive train, The electrical team wires the electrical parts together, and the code team programs the internal computer that interprets the signals from the controller. The marketing team raises funds and performs publicity activities. The course team builds the full-size course used at the annual mini-regional, and the animation team designs and creates the team animation, the topic of which is released at the same time as the robot task. Sponsors include Rockwell Automation and GE.

Team 537 won the St. Louis Regional in 2004 and 2017, the Motorola Regional in 2005, and the Milwaukee Regional in 2006. The team mentors four local middle school FIRST LEGO League teams. They have won the Regional Chairman's Award six times (in 2010, 2012, 2013, 2015, 2016, and 2017), and the Engineering Inspiration Award in 2011.

=== Instrumental music ===
The Hamilton High School band program consists of a concert band made up of all grade levels, two jazz bands, and a competitive marching and pep band. The concert band rehearses on an every-other-day basis and perform throughout the year. The marching band practices during the summer until the end of the marching season (typically mid to late October), and has taken third place in their division at state in 2014, 2015 and 2018, and second in 2019. They participated in the 2019 London New Year’s Day parade. The band students also went to Rome to march in the 2025 New Year's Day parade. They go on a trip every other year which alternates between domestic and international trips. Jazz Band 1 performs publicly at local parties, meetings, and other events.

=== Choral music ===
The Hamilton High School choir program consists of the Charger Singers (traditional choir), Hamiltones a cappella choir, and a competitive show choir, Synergy. The Charger Singers rehearse every other day and perform at four concerts throughout the year. The a cappella choir also practices every other day, and performs at locations around Sussex and Milwaukee, especially over the holiday season as well as four traditional choir concerts. Synergy Show Choir holds auditions in May for the following school year, and has a choreography camp at the end of July. It competes at four competitions during the winter months throughout the state. The choir program has expanded from a single, 30-member all female ensemble to three mixed choirs, all performing music of varying degrees of difficulty and style. They participated with the band in the London New Year’s Day parade.

=== Athletics ===
Hamilton’s football program is one of the school’s most visible athletic programs, competing as the Chargers in the Classic 8 Conference. The program’s modern era was shaped under John Damato, a Hamilton graduate hired as head coach in 2004, whose tenure included a Division 2 state semifinal appearance in 2008 and a shared Greater Metro Conference championship in 2011. After Damato resigned following the 2019 season, Justin Gumm was named head coach in January 2020 and led the Chargers into one of their strongest periods, including conference championships in 2021, 2022, and 2023 and Division 1 state semifinal appearances in 2022 and 2023.

In 2007, the basketball team lost in the sectional round of the state playoffs. They made the state finals in 2018 but lost to Oshkosh North.

The boys' and girls' basketball programs were both GMC conference champions in the 2012-13 season. The girls' bowling team was the district VII conference champion and placed third at state. Cheerleaders won the state championship 2019 and were WACPC state runners-up 2018. In 2010 the girls' track and field team placed second in the 4x100 relay. In 2011 it won state in the 4x200 meter relay and the 4x400 meter relay. In 2012 it placed fourth in the 4x400 meter relay, and second in the 4x200 meter relay at the state meet.

==== Conference affiliation history ====
- Braveland Conference (1963-1993)
- Parkland Conference (1993-1997)
- Greater Metro Conference (1997–2026)
- Classic 8 Conference (2026–present)

=== Clubs ===
The Cultural Exchange Club promotes awareness and understanding of other people and cultures by supporting exchange students. DECA is a marketing and business organization for students. Foreign language clubs offered at Hamilton include Spanish, French, and German, and students learn about the different cultures and go on field trips to learn more about and participate in them. Other clubs include Diversity, Club Action, GSA, Photo, D&D, Christian, and SkillsUSA. Some physically active clubs include intramural basketball, weightlifting, trap shooting club, and ski and snowboard club.
