= Lannon stone =

Sedimentary rock from Wisconsin, USA

Lannon stone is a type of buff-colored, blocky, sedimentary dolomite, whose name is derived from William Lannon, one of the original settlers of the Village of Lannon, Wisconsin. Lannon stone can be found throughout the Niagara Escarpment, which runs underneath much of the Great Lakes. Lannon stone is known for its durability and is used in the construction of houses and businesses, both for the structural integrity it brings and the aesthetically pleasing stone façade. Lannon stone is found throughout southeast Wisconsin in modern constructions either as exterior wall material, stone façade, or ornamental landscaping decorations.

== History ==
In 1855, it was reported that at least a dozen quarries were shipping Lannon stone to Milwaukee by team and wagon, mainly to be used for paving stones. By the early 1890s, fourteen quarries were producing Lannon stone, attracting the attention of builders and architects, who used it in projects such as paving, kilns, and, most notably, solid stone-wall buildings. However, after World War II the industry changed and Lannon stone quickly became limite to an ornamental landscaping rock and thin stone veneer façades.

== Durability ==
Lannon stone was a popular choice for home construction due to its uniform grade, hardness and color.

== See also ==
- Lemont limestone, a similar dolomite stone that was used architecturally in the Midwest.
