= John C. Schumann =

American farmer and politician

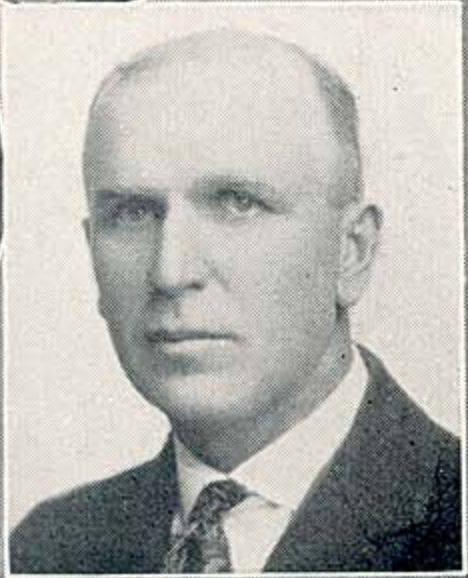
Wisconsin machinist, farmer and state senator John C. Schumann

John C. Schumann (December 6, 1881 – July 11, 1971) was an American machinist, farmer and politician.

Born in Milwaukee, Wisconsin, Schumann went to the Milwaukee public schools and went to a business college. He learn the machinist trade and then went into farming. He moved to Watertown, Wisconsin in 1906. He was involved with the Watertown Milking Co-op (later renamed the Dairy Distributors) and was a past president of the co-op.

== Senate and after ==
Schumann was elected to the Wisconsin State Senate from Wisconsin's 33rd State Senate district (Jefferson and Waukesha counties) in 1922 as a Republican, defeating Democratic incumbent Charles Mulberger, with 10,865 votes to Mulberger's 3,794.

Schuman served in the Senate from 1923 to 1931. He was not a candidate for re-election in 1930, and was succeeded by fellow Republican William H. Edwards.

Schumann died in a hospital in Milwaukee after a long illness.
