= Homer Dopp =

American politician

Homer Dopp (November 25, 1875 – April 18, 1949) was an American Republican politician from Wisconsin.

Homer R. Dopp was born in Oconomowoc, Wisconsin. He graduated from the University of Wisconsin in 1902, married the same year Gertrude Ross in Beloit, a native of that city and a graduate of Beloit College, and taught high school for two years. He was a farmer. He was elected to Wisconsin State Assembly in 1922 receiving 3,267 votes to 1,020 for the independent Democratic candidate Judson Hall. He served in Wisconsin State Assembly in 1923 representing Waukesha County, Wisconsin.

== See also ==
- Katharine Elizabeth Dopp
