= Menomonee, Wisconsin =

Former town in Waukesha County, Wisconsin, United States

- Location within Wisconsin
- Coordinates: 43°09′N 88°07′W
- Country: United States
- State: Wisconsin
- County: Waukesha County

Menomonee used to be a town in Waukesha County, Wisconsin, United States.

== History ==
The town was created in December 1839 in Milwaukee County, Wisconsin Territory out of the eastern part of what had previously been the town Lisbon. On January 31, 1846, the town became part of Waukesha County. Portions of the town were incorporated as the village of Menomonee Falls in 1892, the village of Butler in 1913 and the village of Lannon in 1930.

The last remaining parts of the town were annexed by the village of Menomonee Falls in 1958.
