= William H. Steele (Wisconsin politician) =

American politician

William H. Steele (May 15, 1872 – April 14, 1955) was an American farmer and politician.

== Biography ==
Born in the town of Brookfield, Waukesha County, Wisconsin, Steele went to schools in Pewaukee, Wisconsin and the University of Wisconsin. He taught school for twelve years. In 1911, he bought a dairy farm near Pewaukee and had apple orchards on his farm. Steele served on the Waukesha County Board of Supervisors and was chairman of the county board. Steele also served on the Pewaukee Town Board and was chairman of the Pewaukee Town Board. He also served as president of the village of Pewaukee before he moved to his dairy farm. Steele also served on the Pewaukee School Board and was president of the school board. In 1931 and 1933, Steele served in the Wisconsin State Assembly and was a Republican. Steele died in a hospital in Milwaukee, Wisconsin after a long illness.
