= Koszewko =

- Village
- Location within Poland
- Coordinates: 53°17′N 14°55′E
- Country: Poland
- Voivodeship: West Pomeranian
- County: Stargard
- Gmina: Stargard
- Population: 177

Koszewko [kɔˈʂɛfkɔ] (German: Klein Küssow) is a village in the administrative district of Gmina Stargard, within Stargard County, West Pomeranian Voivodeship, in north-western Poland. It lies approximately 10 km (6 mi) south-west of Stargard and 27 km (17 mi) south-east of the regional capital Szczecin.

For the history of the region, see History of Pomerania.

The village has a population of 177.
