= Louis G. Kieker =

American businessman and politician

Louis G. Kieker (October 4, 1880 – June 24, 1941) was an American businessman and politician.

Kieker was born in the town of Mequon, Ozaukee County, Wisconsin. He graduated from Oshkosh Normal School in 1898. He was in the hotel and real business in Thiensville, Wisconsin. Kieker served on the Ozaukee County Board of Supervisors. He also served as the chairman of the Mequon Town Board from 1880 to 1911. Kieker served on the school board and was clerk of the school board. From 1915 to 1921, Kieker served as postmaster for Thiensville. In 1929 and in 1933, Kieker served in the Wisconsin Assembly as a Democrat. Kieker died at St. Alphonsus Hospital in Port Washington, Wisconsin.
