= George E. Hoyt =

American politician

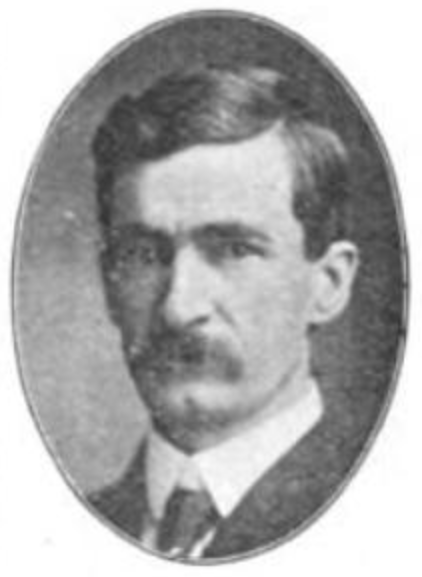

Member of the Wisconsin State Senate
- In office 1910–1914
- Constituency: 33rd District

Member of the Wisconsin State Assembly
- In office 1908–1910
- Constituency: Waukesha County Second District

Personal details
- Born: 1861 Menomonee Falls, Wisconsin
- Died: January 16, 1953 (aged 91) Menomonee Falls, Wisconsin
- Party: Republican
- Education: Northwestern University Medical School
- Occupation: Physician, politician

George E. Hoyt (1861 – January 16, 1953) was a member of the Wisconsin State Assembly and the Wisconsin State Senate.

== Biography ==
Hoyt was born in Menomonee Falls, Wisconsin in 1861. In 1892, he graduated from what was then known as the Northwestern University Medical School. He died at his home in Menomonee Falls on January 16, 1953.

== Political career ==
Hoyt was elected to the Assembly in 1908. Later, he represented the 33rd District in the Senate during the 1911 and 1913 sessions. He was a Republican.
