= Gilead J. Wilmot =

American politician

Gilead J. Wilmot (April 21, 1834 – ?) was an American politician. He was a member of the Wisconsin State Senate.

Wilmot attended Gouverneur Wesleyan Seminary in Gouverneur, New York. During the American Civil War, he was a captain with the 34th Wisconsin Volunteer Infantry Regiment of the Union Army.

== Senate career ==
Wilmot was a member of the Senate from the 33rd District during the 1875 and 1876 sessions. He was a Democrat.
