= Philip Schneider =

American politician

Philip Schneider (first name also Phillip; November 30, 1826 – January 12, 1902) was a member of the Wisconsin State Assembly and the Wisconsin State Senate.

== Biography ==
Schneider was born on November 30, 1826, in what is now Gillenfeld, Germany, and raised in Peoria, Illinois. He later resided in Farmington, Washington County, Wisconsin. He is buried at St. Michaels Cemetery in Kewaskum, Wisconsin.

== Career ==
Schneider was a member of the Assembly during the 1866, 1875, 1876 and 1883 sessions. He represented the 33rd District of the Senate during the 1877 and 1878 sessions. Schneider was Assessor, Town Clerk and Chairman of the Town Board of Supervisors of Farmington. Additionally, he was a county commissioner of Washington County, Wisconsin and Chairman of the Washington County Board of Supervisors. He was a Democrat.
