= Adolphus Zimmermann =

American politician

Adolphus (or Adolph) Zimmermann (February 23, 1812 – July 15, 1891) was an American brewer and politician from Mequon, Wisconsin.

Born in the village of Noschkowitz outside Ostrau in the Kingdom of Saxony, Zimmermann emigrated to the United States. He landed in Milwaukee, Wisconsin Territory on August 1, 1839; two days later, he married Fredericka Opitz (who had emigrated from Saxony on the same vessel on which he came, along with her brother, mother, father, and sister-in-law); one week later they settled on Section 22 of the Town of Mequon, where they purchased 160 acres of land (the Opitzes buying lots nearby) near the Green Bay Road. They lived there until 1855, when they sold the farm and moved into the Village of Mequon. From 1857 to 1876, he ran what was later called the Mequon Brewery, making lager beer, at first in partnership with his brother-in-law William F. Opitz, later by himself.

In 1856, he was a member of the Astrea Masonic Lodge in Port Washington.

== Public offices ==
He, at one point, held the titles of postmaster and justice of the peace of Mequon, and county treasurer of Ozaukee County, simultaneously. He served Mequon as an Assessor and on the Town Board and the County Board of Supervisors: he served as chairman of the town for a total of nineteen years, and Chairman of the County Board for eleven; and held various other local offices.

Zimmermann served in the Wisconsin State Assembly in 1848 (the 1st Wisconsin Legislature) for the Towns of Mequon and Germantown, being succeeded by Peter Turck, also a Democrat, the next year. He returned to the Assembly in 1870 (as Adolph Zimmermann) to represent Ozaukee County (Democratic incumbent Job Haskell was not a candidate), having been elected with 979 votes to 853 for former Democratic Assemblyman Alexander M. Alling, now running as a Republican. He was defeated for re-election in 1870 by Charles G. Meyer (like Zimmermann, a Saxon by birth), with Meyer drawing 1,268 votes running as an independent to Zimmermann's 915. (Meyer had re-joined the Democrats by the time the Assembly convened.) Ozaukee County was then split into two Assembly districts, and in 1872 Zimmermann was elected in a race against the incumbent, Frederick W. Horn: Horn was a Bourbon Democrat who refused to accept the Democratic nomination of Liberal Republican Horace Greeley, instead supporting Charles O'Conor; Zimmermann won with 542 votes to Horn's 523. He was re-elected in 1873, with 679 votes to 319 for independent Rudolph Schmidt. He was not a candidate for re-election, and was succeeded by Horn.

== Later life ==
In 1876, Zimmermann leased the brewery to his son Francis and a partner. Francis was one of Fredericka and Adolphus' six children. She died July 6, 1884.

Always a Democrat, Zimmermann was a delegate to a number of state and local Democratic conventions, and to the 1880 Democratic National Convention.

He died July 15, 1891, and is buried with his wife in the Opitz Cemetery in Mequon.
