= Nicholas E. Becker =

American politician in Wisconsin (1842–1920)

Nicholas E. Becker (1842–1920) was an American politician, a member of the Wisconsin State Assembly.

== Biography ==
Becker was born in Luxembourg in 1842. Later, he was married to Otillia Becker. He died in Fredonia, Wisconsin in 1920 and is buried in Dacada, Wisconsin.

== Career ==
Becker was a member of the Assembly twice. First, from 1899 to 1900 and second, from 1903 to 1904. He was a Democrat.
