= Sussex, Wisconsin =

- Village
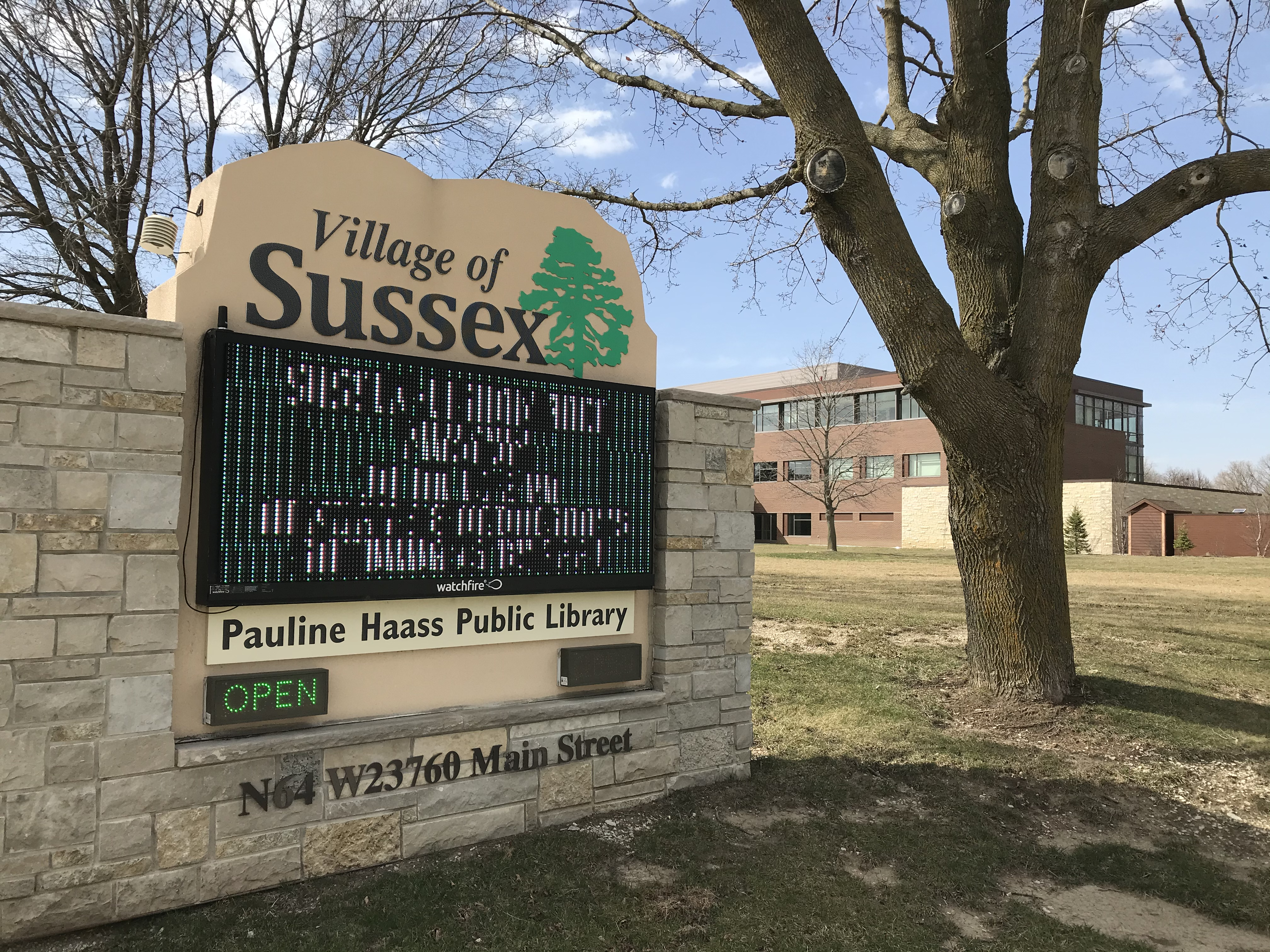
- Sign in front of Sussex civic center

- Location of Sussex in Waukesha County, Wisconsin.
- Coordinates: 43°8′6″N 88°13′13″W
- Country: United States
- State: Wisconsin
- County: Waukesha

Area
  - Total: 8.02 sq mi (20.77 km^{2})
  - Land: 7.97 sq mi (20.63 km^{2})
  - Water: 0.050 sq mi (0.13 km^{2})
- Elevation: 920 ft (280 m)

Population (2020)
  - Total: 11,487
  - Density: 1,378/sq mi (532.2/km^{2})
- Time zone: UTC-6 (Central (CST))
  - Summer (DST): UTC-5 (CDT)
- ZIP code: 53089
- Area code: 262
- FIPS code: 55-78750
- GNIS feature ID: 1575137
- Website: www.sussexwi.gov

Sussex is a village in Waukesha County, Wisconsin, United States, about 19 miles (31 km) northwest of Milwaukee and 9 miles (14 km) north of Waukesha. The village is 7.24 square miles (19 km^{2}) at an elevation of 930 feet. The population was 11,487 at the 2020 census. It is part of the Milwaukee metropolitan area.

== History ==
It was founded in 1843 by George Elliott, a bricklayer from Beckley, East Sussex, and Richard Cooling, a blacksmith from Dorset.

The village was incorporated as Sussex on September 12, 1924 with a population of 387. The election was held August 19, 1924 with a tally of 113 “yes” and 78 “no” votes plus one blank. Frank Grogan served as the first president.

== Geography ==
According to the United States Census Bureau, the village has a total area of 7.62 square miles (19.74 km^{2}), of which 7.57 square miles (19.61 km^{2}) is land and 0.05 square miles (0.13 km^{2}) is water. The Bugline Trail, a paved 15.6-mile (25.1 km) rail trail, passes directly through the village.

== Demographics ==
Historical population
| Census | Pop. | Note | %± |
|---|---|---|---|
| 1880 | 131 | | — |
| 1930 | 496 | | — |
| 1940 | 548 | | 10.5% |
| 1950 | 679 | | 23.9% |
| 1960 | 1,087 | | 60.1% |
| 1970 | 2,758 | | 153.7% |
| 1980 | 3,482 | | 26.3% |
| 1990 | 5,039 | | 44.7% |
| 2000 | 8,828 | | 75.2% |
| 2010 | 10,518 | | 19.1% |
| 2020 | 11,487 | | 9.2% |
U.S. Decennial Census

=== 2020 census ===
As of the 2020 census, Sussex had a population of 11,487. The median age was 40.2 years. 24.5% of residents were under the age of 18 and 13.6% of residents were 65 years of age or older. For every 100 females there were 96.6 males, and for every 100 females age 18 and over there were 93.3 males age 18 and over.

99.5% of residents lived in urban areas, while 0.5% lived in rural areas.

There were 4,554 households in Sussex, of which 34.1% had children under the age of 18 living in them. Of all households, 57.6% were married-couple households, 14.4% were households with a male householder and no spouse or partner present, and 22.6% were households with a female householder and no spouse or partner present. About 24.7% of all households were made up of individuals and 8.7% had someone living alone who was 65 years of age or older.

There were 4,691 housing units, of which 2.9% were vacant. The homeowner vacancy rate was 0.7% and the rental vacancy rate was 4.3%.

Racial composition as of the 2020 census
| Race | Number | Percent |
|---|---|---|
| White | 10,233 | 89.1% |
| Black or African American | 187 | 1.6% |
| American Indian and Alaska Native | 24 | 0.2% |
| Asian | 441 | 3.8% |
| Native Hawaiian and Other Pacific Islander | 4 | 0.0% |
| Some other race | 77 | 0.7% |
| Two or more races | 521 | 4.5% |
| Hispanic or Latino (of any race) | 407 | 3.5% |

=== 2010 census ===
As of the census of 2010, there were 10,518 people, 4,039 households, and 2,932 families living in the village. The population density was 1,389.4 inhabitants per square mile (536.5/km^{2}). There were 4,186 housing units at an average density of 553.0 units per square mile (213.5 units/km^{2}). The racial makeup of the village was 95.2% White, 0.8% African American, 0.3% Native American, 2.1% Asian, 0.5% from other races, and 1.1% from two or more races. Hispanic or Latino of any race were 2.4% of the population.

There were 4,039 households, of which 39.8% had children under the age of 18 living with them, 60.1% were married couples living together, 9.0% had a female householder with no husband present, 3.4% had a male householder with no wife present, and 27.4% were non-families. 22.5% of all households were made up of individuals, and 7.9% had someone living alone who was 65 years of age or older. The average household size was 2.60 and the average family size was 3.09.

The median age in the village was 37.5 years. 28.3% of residents were under the age of 18; 6.6% were between the ages of 18 and 24; 28.1% were from 25 to 44; 27.3% were from 45 to 64; and 9.6% were 65 years of age or older. The gender makeup of the village was 49.4% male and 50.6% female.

=== 2000 census ===
As of the census of 2000, there were 8,828 people, 3,310 households, and 2,502 families living in the village. The population density was 1,464.0 people per square mile (565.3 people/km^{2}). There were 3,441 housing units at an average density of 570.6 units per square mile (220.3 units/km^{2}). The racial makeup of the village was 96.98% White, 0.75% African American, 0.18% Native American, 0.80% Asian, 0.05% Pacific Islander, 0.36% from other races, and 0.88% from two or more races. Hispanic or Latino of any race were 1.67% of the population.

There were 3,310 households, out of which 41.9% had children under the age of 18 living with them, 63.1% were married couples living together, 9.5% had a female householder with no husband present, and 24.4% were non-families. 19.5% of all households were made up of individuals, and 7.6% had someone living alone who was 65 years of age or older. The average household size was 2.67 and the average family size was 3.09.

In the village, the population was spread out, with 29.3% under the age of 18, 6.9% from 18 to 24, 36.3% from 25 to 44, 19.2% from 45 to 64, and 8.3% who were 65 years of age or older. The median age was 34 years. For every 100 females, there were 96.0 males. For every 100 females age 18 and over, there were 93.8 males.

The median income for a household in the village was $60,283, and the median income for a family was $65,702. Males had a median income of $46,319 versus $30,182 for females. The per capita income for the village was $23,913. About 3.5% of families and 3.7% of the population were below the poverty line, including 5.0% of those under age 18 and 4.9% of those age 65 or over.

== Economy ==
The headquarters of Quad/Graphics is located in Sussex. Kraft Foods had operated a Tombstone and DiGiorno pizza manufacturing plant in the village. The plant, which employed 330 employees, closed in March 2007.

== Education ==
Sussex is served by the Hamilton School District, which operates a preschool, four elementary schools, an intermediate school (5th and 6th grade), a middle school (7th and 8th), and a high school in the Sussex area.

Sussex is home to the Pauline Haass Public Library, a member library of the Bridges Library System. The Sussex-Lisbon Area Historium is in the Sussex Civic Center.

== Notable people ==
- William H. Edwards, multi-term state legislator from Sussex
- Kellyn Taylor, long-distance runner, native of Sussex
- Patrick Baldwin Jr., NBA basketball player, graduate of Sussex Hamilton High School

== Media ==
- WSJP 1640 AM – Relevant Radio
