= Samuel A. White =

American politician

Samuel A. White (August 10, 1823 – March 4, 1878) was an American politician.

Born in Franklin, New York, White graduated from Hamilton College. In 1845, he moved to Port Washington, Wisconsin, where he was appointed postmaster in 1853. In 1857, White served in the Wisconsin State Assembly as a Democrat. In 1861, he was appointed county judge for Ozaukee County, Wisconsin. In 1864 White was appointed Wisconsin assistant bank comptroller and moved to Whitewater, Wisconsin. In 1871–1872, White again served in the Wisconsin State Assembly. He died in Whitewater, Wisconsin.
