= William Henry Fitzgerald =

American politician (1848–1922)

William Henry Fitzgerald (1848–1922) was a member of the Wisconsin State Assembly.

Fitzgerald was born May 15, 1848 in what is now Cedarburg, Wisconsin. Fitzgerald was originally a member during the 1878, 1879 and 1880 sessions. After the length of sessions were change to two years, he was again a member during the 1891 and 1893 sessions. Previously, Fitzgerald was Town Treasurer of Cedarburg in 1872 and Chairman (similar to Mayor) of Cedarburg in 1876 and 1877. Additionally, he was a justice of the peace. Fitzgerald was identified as an Independent Democrat and a Democrat. He married Teresa M. Dunn (1853–1933) and died on January 3, 1922, in Grafton, Wisconsin.
