= Stephen F. Mayer =

American businessman and politician (1854-1935)

Stephen F. Mayer (February 4, 1854 – August 3, 1935) was an American businessman and politician.

Born in West Bend, Wisconsin, Mayer went to the West Bend public schools and took a commercial course at the University of Notre Dame. Mayer was in the brewery industry. He was also president of the West Bend Aluminum Company. He married into the Pick family who were very prominent in West Bend. His wife Isadore M. Pick was the sister of Andrew Pick, who was the 11th mayor of West Bend and the daughter of John Pick Sr, who was the first village president of Slinger. Mayer served on the West Bend city board and on the West Bend school board. He also served on the Washington County, Wisconsin Board of Supervisors and was the president of the county board. Mayer served as county treasurer and was a Democrat. From 1895 to 1899, Mayer served in the Wisconsin State Senate. Mayer died of heart disease at his home in West Bend, Wisconsin.
