= William F. Opitz =

American politician

William F. Opitz was a member of the Wisconsin State Assembly.

== Biography ==
A German emigrant, Opitz was born in about 1816. He moved to what is now Mequon, Wisconsin in 1839. Opitz died at his home in Grafton (town), Wisconsin on June 16, 1882. He was brother-in-law of Adolphus Zimmermann.

== Career ==
Opitz was elected to the Assembly in 1860. Other positions he held include Chairman (similar to Mayor) of Grafton, as well as Sheriff and a member of the County Board of Ozaukee County, Wisconsin. He was a Democrat.
