= Judson Hall =

American politician

Judson Hall (October 22, 1855 – November 25, 1938) was an American educator and politician.

Born in Merton, Waukesha County, Wisconsin, Hall grew up on a farm. He became a teacher and was Hartland town clerk. Hall was also president and supervisor of the village of Hartland, Wisconsin. He was elected county clerk for Waukesha County and was a Democrat. In 1913, Hall served in the Wisconsin State Assembly. He died in Hartland, Wisconsin.
