= Job Haskell =

American politician

Job Haskell was a member of the New York State Assembly and the Wisconsin State Assembly.

== Biography ==
Haskell was born on September 10, 1794. During the War of 1812, he served with the United States Army. Conflicts he took part in include the Battle of Lundy's Lane. Haskell died on December 8, 1879.

== Political career ==
Haskell was a member of the New York State Assembly in 1835 and the Wisconsin State Assembly in 1869. He was a Democrat.

== See also ==
- 58th New York State Legislature
