= Edward Reed Blake =

American politician

Edward Reed Blake (November 28, 1844 – June 3, 1923) was an American politician and businessman.

Born in Franklin, Massachusetts, Reed went to public school and commercial college. He moved to Port Washington, Wisconsin in 1848. During the American Civil War, Blake served in the 24th Wisconsin Volunteer Infantry Regiment. He was a grain and lumber dealer. Reed was also a merchant. Blake served on the school board as a director. In 1874, Blake served in the Wisconsin State Assembly and was a Democrat. Then, from 1885 to 1889, Blake served in the Wisconsin State Senate. Blake died in Port Washington, Wisconsin.
