= West Bend Company =

Cookware contract manufacturer

West Bend Company is an American cookware manufacturer based in West Bend, Wisconsin. The company operated under that name from 1911 to 2001, and resumed using the name in 2026.

...in 1910, Herman Wentorf left Aluminum Goods to join his brother-in-law Kummerow at Standard Aluminum. Aluminum Goods management demanded that Herman’s brothers, Carl and Robert, convince him to return or they would be fired. Instead, they quit and with Bernhard Ziegler started the cookware manufacturer, West Bend Aluminum Co., in 1911. When a pocketbook manufacturing company burned down in 1911, many residents of West Bend, Wisconsin, were thrown out of work. Young Bernhardt C. Ziegler, a local entrepreneurial dynamo who had organized his own full-fledged fire-insurance company while still in high school, set out to find a substitute industry for the townspeople.

The West Bend Aluminum Company was founded with a group of businessmen (Stephen F. Mayer, Martin Walter, and Andrew and Edwin Pick of West Bend, Wisconsin; and Carl and Robert Wentorf, previously of Two Rivers, Wisconsin), on 27 September 1911, by Bernhard Carl Ziegler, who was also president of the First National Bank, chairman of Gehl Brothers Manufacturing Company, president of the West Bend Mutual Fire Insurance Company, and director of the Wisconsin Manufacturers Association. In 1920, West Bend Aluminum Company introduced the Waterless Cooker, a large aluminum pot with inset pans designed to cook an entire meal over one burner.

B.C Ziegler supported, in October 1934, the Aluminum Credit Union, later, West Bend Employees Credit Union in 1963, in 1990 rebranded to Glacier Hills Credit Union, and transitioned to a community charter.

The West Bend Aluminum Company manufactured aluminum cookware and electrical appliances, but also made two-stroke cycle engines, including outboard boat motors (Elgin, the first air-cooled outboard motor, sold exclusively through Sears, Roebuck and Co.). Art Ingels used a surplus West Bend engine to power the first kart. Clayton Jacobson II used a West Bend 2-stroke motor to power the first stand-up Jet Ski. The engine division of West Bend was sold to Chrysler, then to Brunswick, and finally to US Motor Power.

In 1961, West Bend Aluminum Company changed its name to West Bend Company.

In 2002, Regal Ware, Inc., a cookware manufacturer located in Kewaskum, Wisconsin, acquired certain assets of the West Bend Company. In 2003, Regal Ware sold the Small Kitchen Appliance Division of the West Bend Company to Focus Products Group LLC. The Small Kitchen Appliance Division is now known as West Bend Housewares. Regal Ware retained the West Bend cookware manufacturing division and product lines of the West Bend Company.

Regal Ware’s cookware manufacturing division operated under the name SynergyOps in the early 2020s until 2026, reflecting its business as a contract manufacturer for other cookware companies. In 2026, SynergyOps changed their name back to West Bend Company and reinforced the company’s "commitment to U.S. manufacturing, operational excellence, and the teams behind products made in Wisconsin". At the same time, Regal Ware changed their name to Regal Holdings, Inc., citing its new portfolio platform structure.

As of 2026, West Bend Company provides cookware contract manufacturing services for their owned brands and to other cookware companies; the company has maintained manufacturing operations in West Bend since its inception in 1911.

The Cast Iron Luxury Living at River Shores campus was once home to the West Bend Aluminum Company.
