= Wisconsin's 58th Assembly district =

American legislative district in eastern Wisconsin

Wisconsin's 58th State Assembly district
- 2024 map defined in 2023 Wisc. Act 94; 2022 map defined in Johnson v. Wisconsin Elections Commission; 2011 map was defined in 2011 Wisc. Act 43
Assemblymember
Rick Gundrum; R–Slinger
since January 24, 2018 (8 years)
- Demographics: 92.88% White; 1.27% Black; 2.75% Hispanic; 1.17% Asian; 1.38% Native American; 0.09% Hawaiian/Pacific Islander
- Population (2020) • Voting age: 59,073; 46,166
- Website: Official website
- Notes: Eastern Wisconsin

The 58th Assembly district of Wisconsin is one of 99 districts in the Wisconsin State Assembly. Located in southeastern Wisconsin, the district comprises parts of central and eastern Washington County, including the villages of Jackson, Newburg, and Slinger, and most of the city of West Bend. It also contains the West Bend Municipal Airport and the Jackson Marsh State Natural Area. The district is represented by Republican Rick Gundrum, elected to the seat in a January 2018 special election following the death of previous officeholder Bob Gannon.

The 58th Assembly district is located within Wisconsin's 20th Senate district, along with the 59th and 60th Assembly districts.

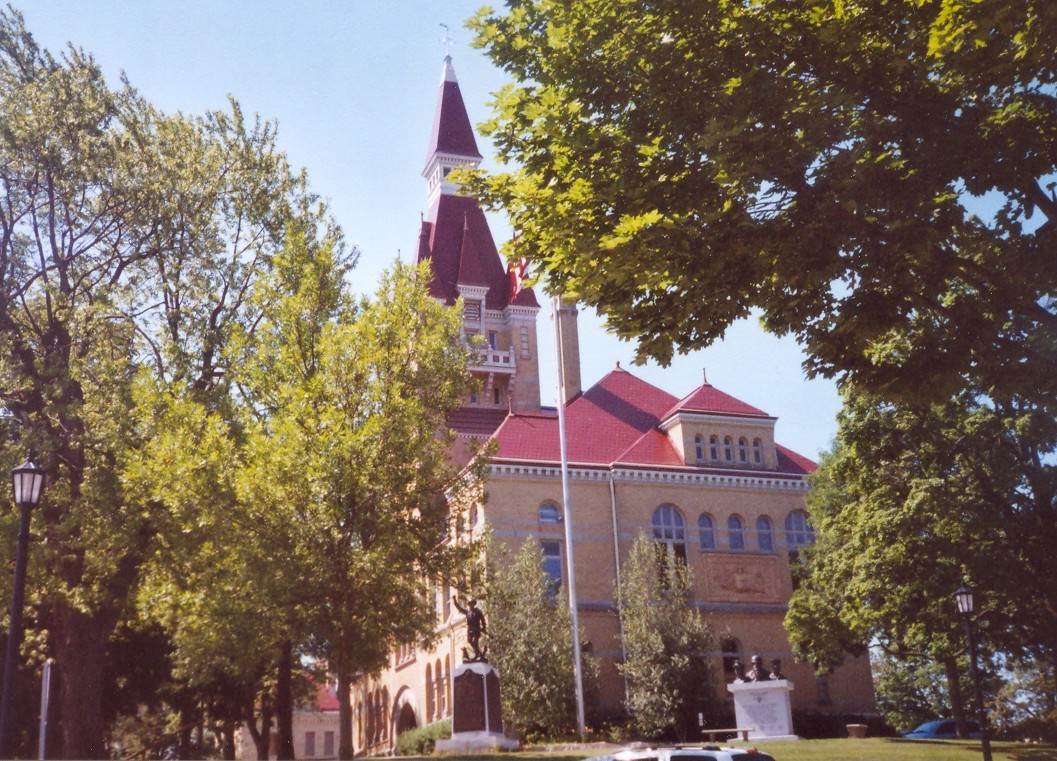
Washington County courthouse in West Bend

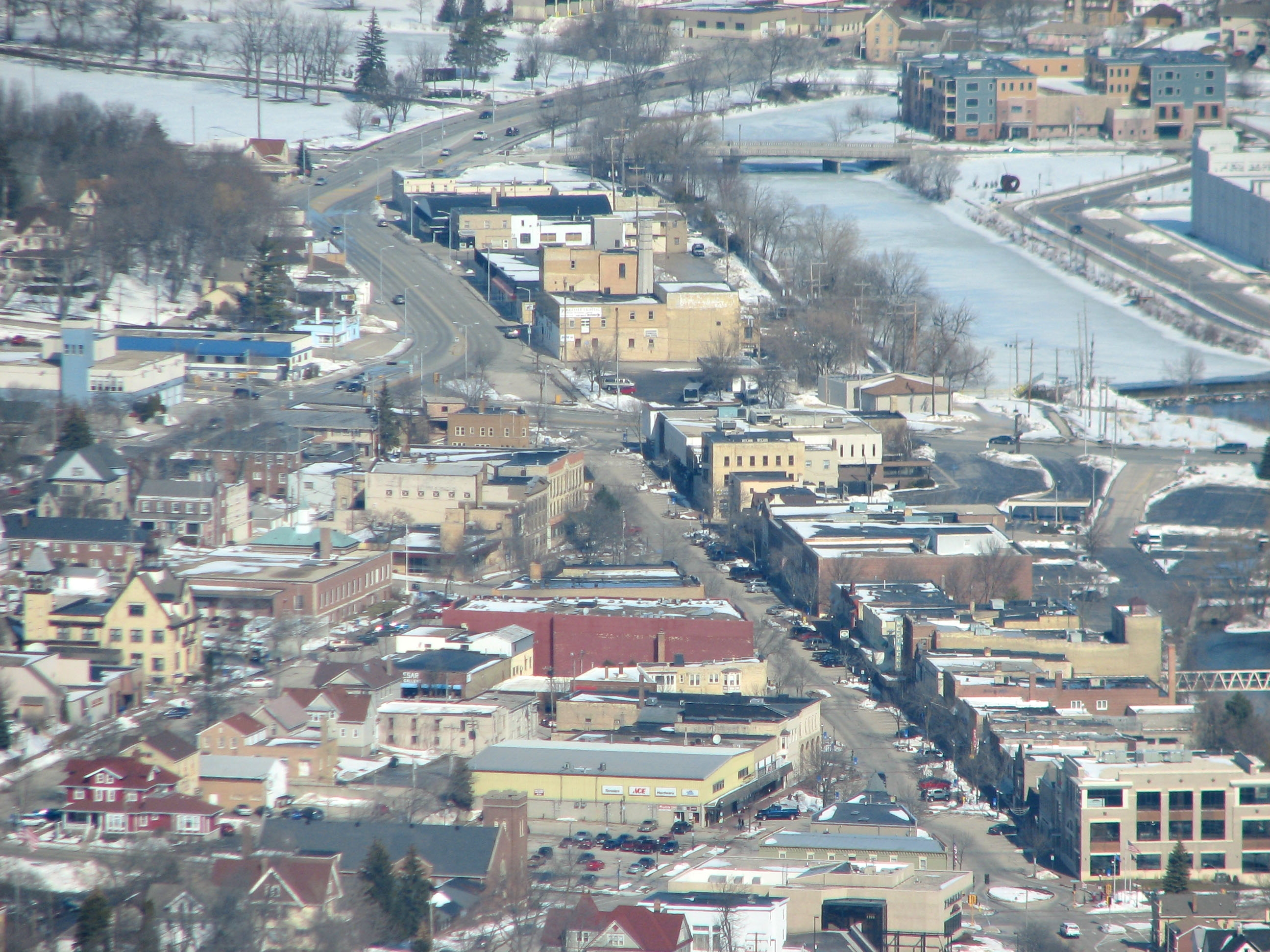
Aerial view of West Bend

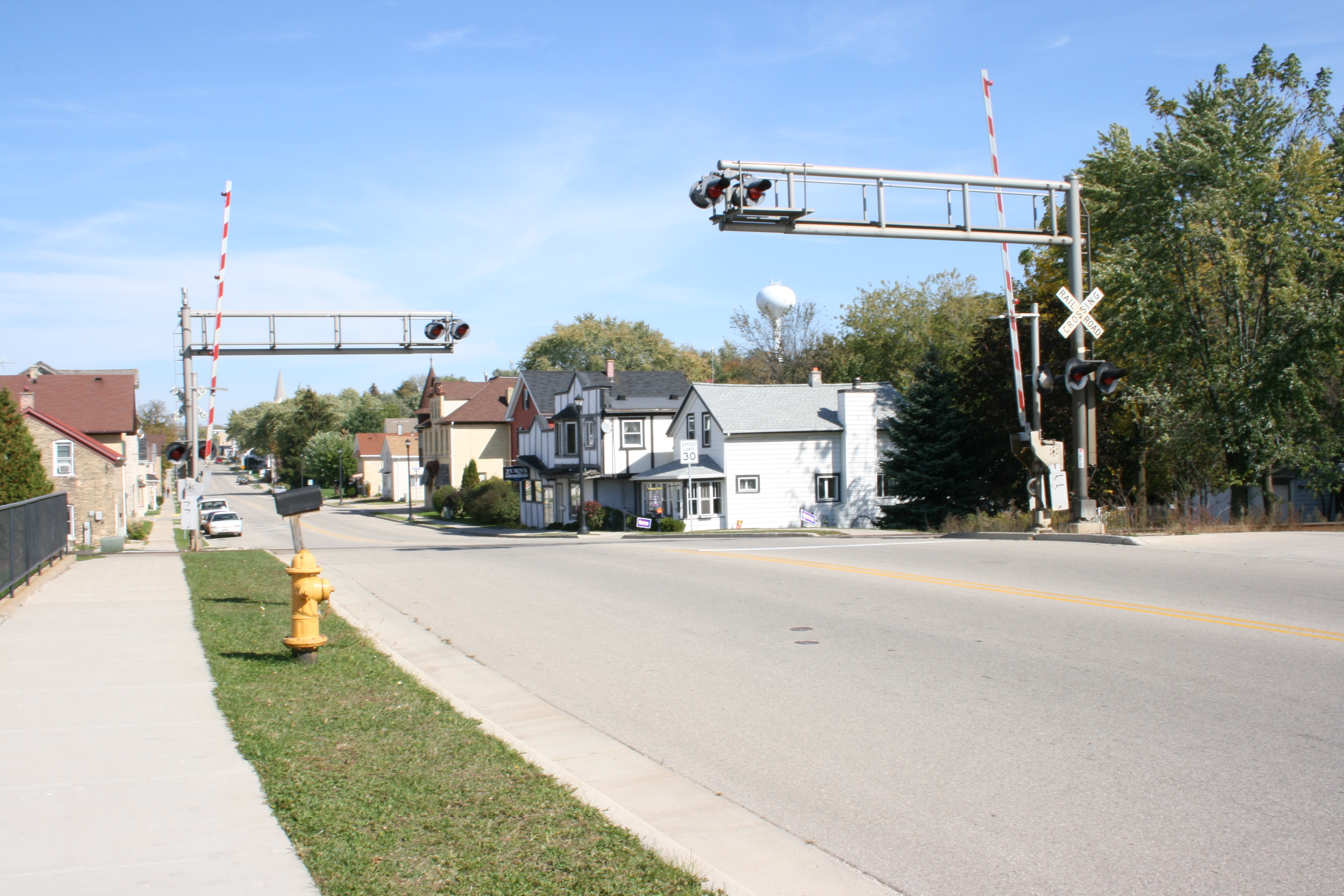
Downtown Slinger

== List of past representatives ==
List of representatives to the Wisconsin State Assembly from the 58th district
Member	Party	Residence	Counties represented	Term start	Term end	Ref.
District created
Carl Otte	Dem.	Sheboygan	Sheboygan	January 1, 1973	January 3, 1983	
David Helbach	Dem.	Stevens Point	Portage, Waupaca	January 3, 1983	August 12, 1983	
--Vacant--			Portage, Waupaca	August 12, 1983	November 11, 1983	
William Horvath	Dem.	Stevens Point	Portage, Waupaca	November 11, 1983	January 7, 1985	
John L. Merkt	Rep.	Mequon	Ozaukee, Washington	January 7, 1985	January 2, 1989	
Steven D. Loucks	Rep.	Mequon	Ozaukee, Washington	January 2, 1989	January 4, 1993	
Michael A. Lehman	Rep.	Hartford	Dodge, Ozaukee, Washington	January 4, 1993	January 5, 2003	
Glenn Grothman	Rep.	West Bend	Washington	January 5, 2003	January 3, 2005	
Patricia Strachota	Rep.	West Bend	Washington	January 3, 2005	January 5, 2015	
Bob Gannon	Rep.	West Bend	Washington	January 5, 2015	October 3, 2017	
--Vacant--			Washington	October 3, 2017	January 24, 2018	
Rick Gundrum	Rep.	Slinger	Washington	January 24, 2018	Current	
Bernie Newman	Rep.		Washington	January 4, 2027	Member-elect	
