= Louis D. Guth =

American politician

Louis D. Guth (May 25, 1857 – March 15, 1939) was an American businessman and politician.

== Biography ==
Born in the town of Polk, Washington County, Wisconsin, Guth went to Northwestern University and then graduated from the Milwaukee Spencerian Business College in 1870. Guth lived briefly in Minneapolis, Minnesota. In 1888, Guth settled in Kewaskum, Wisconsin and was in the insurance business. Guth served as chairman of the Kewaskum Town Board and was one of the incorporators of the village of Kewaskum, Wisconsin. Guth served as the 6th and 9th Village President of Kewaskum from 1907 - 1909 and 1914 - 1917. His brother Lorenz Guth ran for West Bend Mayor in 1914 against William G. Bratz and B.C. Ziegler. He was assessor of incomes for Washington and Ozaukee Counties. In 1899, Guth served in the Wisconsin State Assembly and was a Republican. During his term he was sharply criticized in the press for introducing the unsuccessful "Guth bicycle bill," which would have forbidden bicycles on Wisconsin roads. Guth died at his home in Kewaskum, Wisconsin.
