= Eisenbahn State Trail =

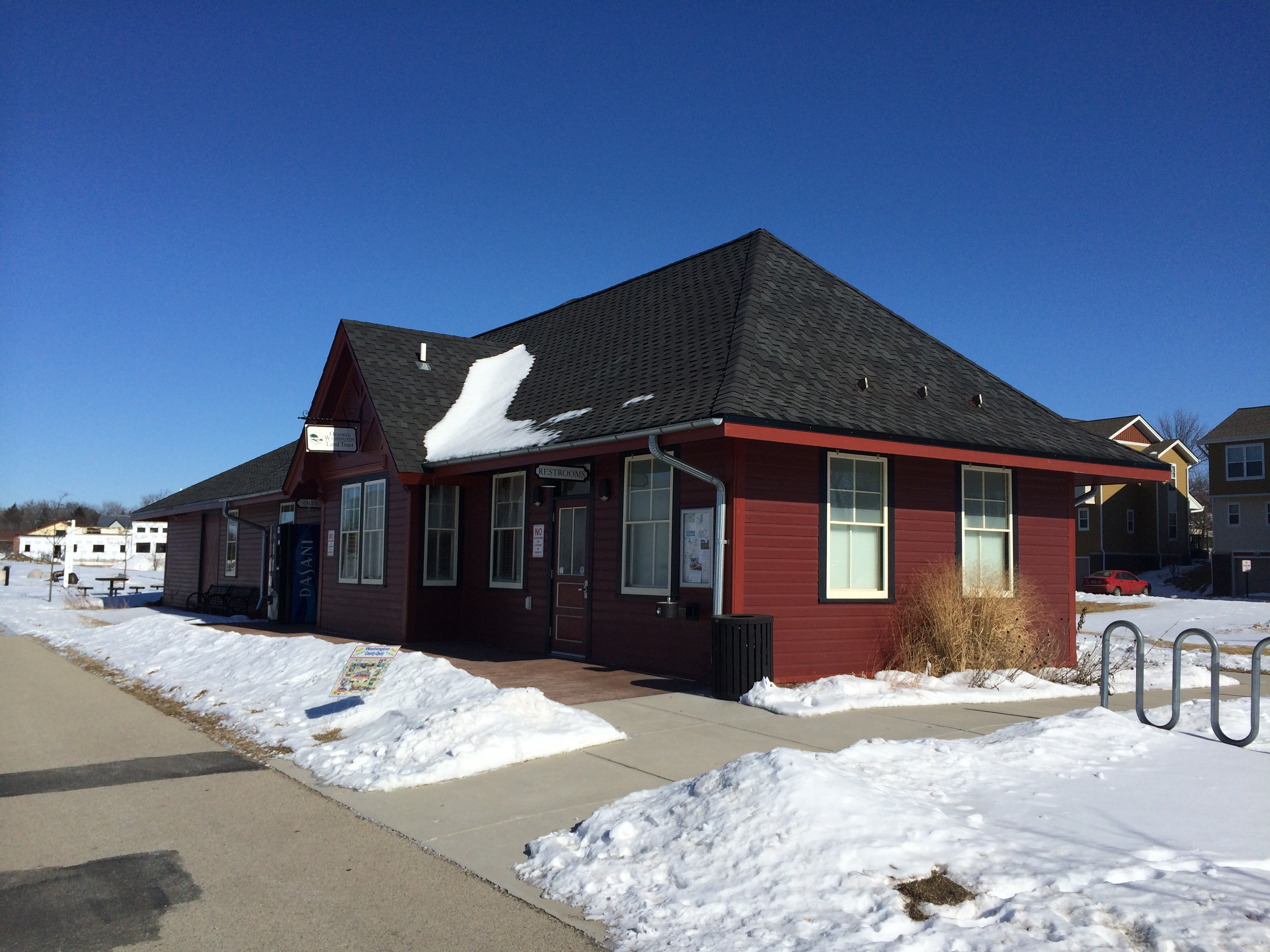
- The West Bend C&NW depot alongside the trail
- Length: 25 mi
- Location: Wisconsin, United States
- Established: April 28, 2006
- Trailheads: Eden, Wisconsin; West Bend, Wisconsin
- Use: Hiking, bicycling, in-line skating, snowmobiling, ATV, snowshoeing, cross-country skiing
- Season: Year-round
- Sights: glacial landforms, Milwaukee River
- Surface: paved, crushed limestone
- Right of way: former Fox Valley Railroad
- Website: Wisconsin DNR

The Eisenbahn State Trail is a multi-purpose trail designated as a park by the Wisconsin Department of Natural Resources. The trail is maintained by the counties through which it transgresses, Washington and Fond du Lac counties. The trail extends 25 miles, from the village of Eden in the north (43°41′12″N 88°21′32″W) to Rusco Road, south of West Bend (43°23′00″N 88°09′47″W). The trail follows the route of the former Fox Valley Railroad.

== Route description ==
The trail is 25 miles long. It passes through the cities of West Bend, Kewaskum, Campbellsport, and ends at the Community Park in Eden, running along the west side of the northern unit of the Kettle Moraine State Forest and crossing the Ice Age Trail. The trail is partially paved and partially covered in crushed limestone.

A ribbon-cutting ceremony opening a connection to the Moraine Park Technical College Campus in West Bend occurred on September 4, 2014.

== Geology and biology ==
The trail travels through the Kettle Moraine region of Wisconsin. The landscape is dotted with glacial landforms. The trail runs along the Milwaukee River near West Bend, including three bridges.

== History of the trail ==
The Eisenbahn Trail was a Rails to Trails project, built on the abandoned Fox Valley Railroad right of way. The name "Eisenbahn" is a reference to the trails origins, meaning "iron road." The railroad was originally constructed in 1871 by Chicago and North Western Transportation Company. It was purchased by Fox River Valley Railroad in 1988 before being abandoned in 1999. The official opening of the segment located in Washington County was on April 28, 2006.

== Future ==
The rail corridor is owned by the State of Wisconsin. It is allowed to be used for recreational purposes under a federal program, with the potential for future rail use.
