= Gundrum =

Gundrum is a surname. Notable people with the surname include:

- Mark Gundrum (born 1970), American politician
- Rick Gundrum, American politician and businessman
