= Patricia Strachota =

21st century American politician

Pat Strachota

Chair of the Wisconsin Ethics Commission
- Incumbent
- Assumed office June 2022
- Preceded by: Awais Khaleel

Member of the Wisconsin Ethics Commission
- Incumbent
- Assumed office June 30, 2016
- Appointed by: Robin Vos
- Preceded by: Position established

Majority Leader of the Wisconsin Assembly
- In office March 4, 2014 – January 5, 2015
- Preceded by: Bill Kramer
- Succeeded by: Jim Steineke

Member of the Wisconsin State Assembly from the 58th district
- In office January 3, 2005 – January 5, 2015
- Preceded by: Glenn Grothman
- Succeeded by: Bob Gannon

Personal details
- Born: June 29, 1955 (age 71) Cuyahoga County, Ohio, U.S.
- Party: Republican
- Children: 4
- Education: St. Mary's College, South Bend, Indiana
- Occupation: Politician

Patricia "Pat" Strachota (born June 29, 1955) is an American government administrator and Republican politician from West Bend, Wisconsin. She is the chair of the Wisconsin Ethics Commission, since June 2022. She has been a member of the commission since its creation in 2016, appointed by Wisconsin Assembly speaker Robin Vos and reappointed by him in 2021. She previously served 10 years in the Wisconsin State Assembly, and was majority leader from March 2014 to January 2015.

== Biography ==
Born in Cuyahoga County, Ohio, Strachota graduated from St. Mary's College, South Bend, Indiana. She served on the Washington County, Wisconsin Board of Supervisors from 1986 to 2002. She worked for the Washington County Department of Human Resources as a personnel/safety analyst. She served in the Wisconsin State Assembly from 2005 to 2015.

In February 2014, Strachota announced she would not seek reelection. A few weeks later, Republican Assembly majority leader Bill Kramer was accused of harassing two women during a trip to Washington, D.C. The Republican caucus held an emergency meeting and voted to remove him from leadership and replace him with Strachota for the remainder of the term.

While serving in the legislature, she was a member of the American Legislative Exchange Council.

Wisconsin State Assembly
| Preceded by Glenn Grothman | Member of the Wisconsin State Assembly from the 58th district January 3, 2005 – January 5, 2015 | Succeeded by Bob Gannon |
| Preceded by Bill Kramer | Majority Leader of the Wisconsin State Assembly; March 4, 2014 – January 5, 2015 | Succeeded by Jim Steineke |
Government offices
| New commission established | Member of the Wisconsin Ethics Commission; June 30, 2016 – present | Incumbent |
| Preceded by Awais Khaleel | Chair of the Wisconsin Ethics Commission; June 2022 – present | Incumbent |
