= Art Ingels =

American racing driver (1918–1981)

John Arthur Ingels (May 14, 1918 – December 16, 1981) was an American racing driver. He is known as "the father of karting" for his invention of the go-kart.

In 1956, while Ingels was a race car builder at Kurtis Kraft, a famous builder of Indy race cars during the 1950s, he assembled the first go-kart in history out of scrap metal and a surplus West Bend Company two-stroke engine. It was built in his two-car garage in Echo Park, California, and was tested in the Rose Bowl parking lot, where it gained hundreds of enthusiasts.
