= James Davison (Wisconsin politician) =

American politician

James Davison (born December 6, 1828) was an Irish-born American politician. He was a member of the Wisconsin State Assembly.

== Biography ==
Davison was born on December 6, 1828, near what was then Belfast, Ireland. After residing in West Bend, Wisconsin, he moved to Dodge County, Wisconsin, in 1868.

== Assembly career ==
Davison was a member of the Assembly in 1879. He was a Democrat.
