= Bill Kramer =

American Republican politician (b. 1965)

Majority Leader of the Wisconsin Assembly
- In office September 16, 2013 – March 4, 2014
- Preceded by: Scott Suder
- Succeeded by: Patricia Strachota

Member of the Wisconsin State Assembly from the 97th district
- In office January 1, 2007 – January 5, 2015
- Preceded by: Ann Nischke
- Succeeded by: Scott Allen

Personal details
- Born: January 21, 1965 (age 61) Waukesha, Wisconsin
- Party: Republican
- Education: Duke University, University of Wisconsin–Whitewater
- Profession: attorney
- Website: Official website

Bill Kramer (born January 21, 1965) is an American attorney, businessman, and former politician. A Republican, he was a member of the Wisconsin State Assembly for 8 years and was majority leader from September 2013 to March 2014, when he was forced to quit the leadership due to sexual misconduct charges.

== Career ==
Born in Waukesha, Wisconsin, Kramer graduated from Waukesha South High School, He then graduated from University of Wisconsin–Whitewater with a degree in accounting and received his J.D. degree from Duke University. Kramer is the owner of an accounting business and has served in the Wisconsin State Assembly since 2007 as a Republican. In 2013, the Republican members of the Wisconsin Assembly named Kramer majority leader of the Wisconsin Assembly, replacing Scott Suder, who resigned.

== Sexual assault allegations and conviction ==
Kramer was removed from this position on March 4, 2014, following several allegations of sexual harassment. He was arrested in March 2014 after a GOP staffer accused him of sexual assault. She alleged that Kramer had grabbed her breasts and groin after a Republican event at a bar in Muskego on April 8, 2011. Kramer pleaded not guilty to those charges.

Kramer was sentenced to five months in jail, after pleading no contest to two charges of sexual assault with three years probation and was stripped of his Majority Leader status. He was allowed to finish out his term, but did not seek re-election.

Wisconsin State Assembly
Preceded by Ann Nischke	Member of the Wisconsin State Assembly from the 97th district January 1, 2007 – January 5, 2015	Succeeded by Scott Allen
Preceded by Scott Suder	Majority Leader of the Wisconsin Assembly; September 16, 2013 – March 4, 2014	Succeeded by Patricia Strachota
