= Kenneth William Haebig =

American politician and lawyer (1915–1978)

Kenneth William Haebig (September 2, 1915 – February 2, 1978) was an American politician and lawyer.

Born in West Bend, Wisconsin, Haebig grew up in West Bend. He served in the United States Army during World War II. Haebig received his bachelor's degree from Marquette University and his law degree from Marquette University Law School. He lived in Kewaskum, Wisconsin and practiced law. From 1951 to 1955, Haebig served in the Wisconsin State Assembly and was a Republican. Haebig died in Los Angeles, California.
