= Kewaskum, Wisconsin =

Village in Fond du Lac and Washington counties, Wisconsin

- Village
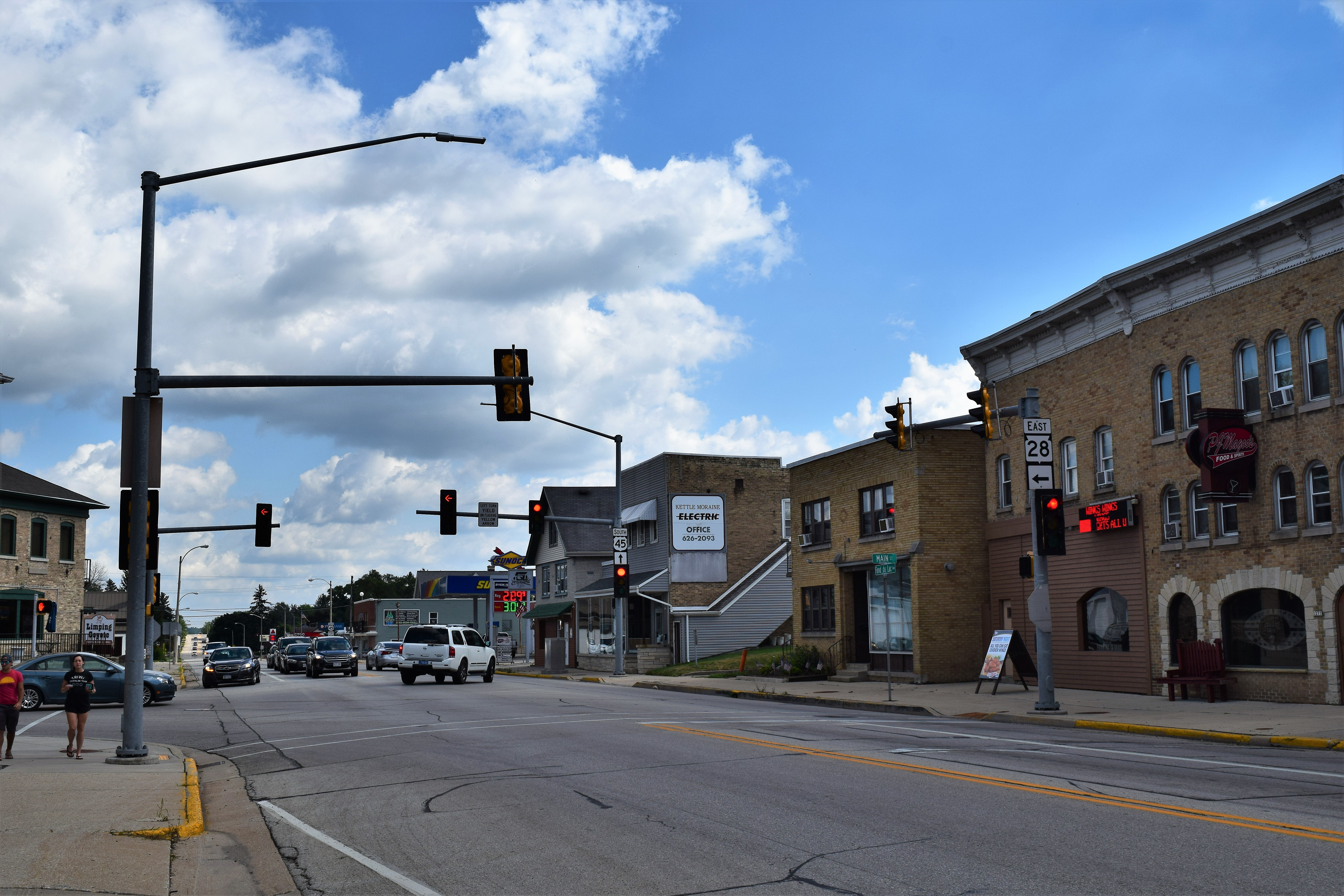
- Intersection of US 45 and WIS 28 in downtown Kewaskum
- Motto: Gateway to the Kettle Moraine
- Interactive map of Kewaskum, Wisconsin
- Location within Wisconsin
- Coordinates: 43.5193°N 88.2314°W
- Country: United States
- State: Wisconsin
- Counties: Washington, Fond du Lac
- Settled: 1852
- Incorporated: May 7, 1895
- Named for: Chief Kewaskum

Government
  - President: Mary Schlitt
  - Village Administrator: Cassandra Hiller
  - Trustees: Jim Wright; Richard Knoebel; Justin Weninger; Wendy May Muckerheide; Keith Backhaus
  - Village Clerk: Tammy Butz

Area
  - Total: 2.686 sq mi (6.956 km^{2})
  - Land: 2.686 sq mi (6.956 km^{2})
  - Water: 0 sq mi (0.000 km^{2}) 0.00%
- Elevation: 935 ft (285 m)

Population (2020)
  - Total: 4,309
  - Estimate (2025): 4,561
  - Density: 1,604/sq mi (619.5/km^{2})
- Time zone: UTC–6 (Central (CST))
  - Summer (DST): UTC–5 (CDT)
- ZIP Code: 53040
- Area code: 262
- FIPS code: 55-39300
- GNIS feature ID: 1583473
- Highways: WIS 28, US 45
- Website: kewaskumwi.gov

Kewaskum is a village in Washington and Fond du Lac Counties, Wisconsin, United States. The population was 4,309 as of the 2020 census, and was estimated at 4,561 in 2025.

All of this population resided in the Washington County portion of the village. The village is mostly surrounded by the town of Kewaskum.

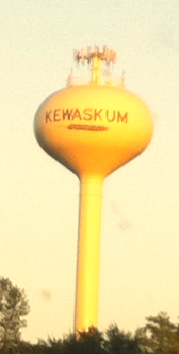
Kewaskum water tower

== Toponymy ==
Kewaskum was the leader of a group of Potawatomi Native Americans who lived in Washington County in the 1840s. He was friendly with the early settlers, including future Wisconsin state senator Densmore Maxon. He died sometime between 1847 and 1850. In 1849, the early settlers named Kewaskum (and later the village) in his honor. In the Potawatomi language, Kewaskum means "turning back on his tracks" or "retracing his steps."

== History ==
In the early 19th century, the Kewaskum area was home to the Potawatomi, who surrendered the land to the United States Federal Government in the 1833 Treaty of Chicago, which required them to leave Wisconsin by 1838. While many Potawatomis moved west of the Mississippi River to Kansas, some chose to remain, and were referred to as "strolling Potawatomi" in contemporary documents because many of them were migrants who subsisted by squatting on their ancestral lands, which were now owned by white settlers. A band of strolling Potawatomi traveled through Dodge, Jefferson, and Washington counties, and was led by Chief Kewaskum, who had a camp on Pike Lake. The chief was friendly with the white settlers who began arriving in the 1840s. He died sometime between 1847 and 1850, but itinerant Potawatomis lived in Washington County into the late 19th century, when many of them gathered in northern Wisconsin to form the Forest County Potawatomi Community.

The first settlers in the area were the Barnes family, who arrived in 1844 and began farming near the future village. In 1847, the Wisconsin Territorial Legislature created the town of North Bend from land that had previously been part of the town of West Bend, and the community's first post office was established. In 1849, the residents changed their community's name to the "town of Kewaskum" to distinguish it from neighboring West Bend.

While the first settlers were primarily farmers, the village of Kewaskum traces its origins to J. H. Myer, who settled on a horseshoe bend in the Milwaukee River in 1852 and later built a sawmill and a gristmill. The settlement, which was originally known as "Myer's Mill" and later as "Kewaskum Center," soon became a market town with a general store and a blacksmith shop serving the local farmers. The first religious services were held in private homes, and in 1862 the Catholic villagers constructed a church. A German Methodist church was built in 1866 and a Lutheran church was built in 1868. In 1873, the Chicago and North Western Railway completed a line from Milwaukee to Fond du Lac with a station in Kewaskum. The community's rail connections caused the local economy to grow and prosper as new businesses, including hotels, stores, and grain elevators opened around the station. The Village of Kewaskum incorporated on May 7, 1895.

While the village economy was primarily agricultural in the 19th and early 20th centuries, Kewaskum became increasingly industrialized throughout the 1900s. In 1919, Adolph L. Rosenheimer founded the Kewaskum Aluminum Company in the village to manufacture aluminum cookware. During World War II, the company made aluminum products for military use, before being acquired by Enterprise Aluminum Company of Ohio in 1945. The company was renamed Regal Ware in 1951, and through acquisitions of aluminum companies in Wisconsin, Illinois, Ohio, and Mississippi, moved into the international high-end consumer cookware market. Regal Ware was sold to Vernon Hills, Illinois-based Focus Products Group which took the name West Bend Housewares. Kewaskum's population grew during the post–World War II economic expansion, leading the village to annex land from the town of Kewaskum for new commercial and residential developments. The village first annexed land in 1959 and again in 20 of the next 46 years. Additionally, Kewaskum annexed a noncontiguous parcel of land in the town of Auburn in Fond du Lac County in 1963.

== Government ==
The village of Kewaskum's local government consists of an elected board president and six board trustees, as well as a hired village administrator. The board president and trustee terms are two years.

=== List of presidents ===
#	President	Term
1	Adolph Lehman Rosenheimer	1895 – 1900
2	Henry J. Lay	1900 – 1902
3	August G. Koch	1902 – 1904
4	William Stark --resigned--	1904 – December 1906
5	Valentine Peters Interim	December 1906 – 1907
6	Louis D. Guth	1907 – 1909
7	Valentine Peters	1909 – 1912
8	John P. Klassen	1912 – 1914
9	Louis D. Guth	1914 – 1917
10	William Zeigler --resigned--	1917 – May 20, 1918
11	John Klessig Interim	May 20, 1918 – 1919
12	Byron Heinrich Rosenheimer	1919 – 1921
13	E. L. Morgenroth	1921 – 1924
14	David M. Rosenheimer	1924 – 1927
15	Lehman Peter Rosenheimer	1924 – 1931
16	Theodore R. Schmidt	1931 – 1933
17	Valentine Peters	1933 – 1935
18	Adolph Lehman Rosenheimer Jr.	1935 – 1940
19	Anthony P. Schaeffer	1940 – 1942
20	Charles F. Miller	1942 – 1957
21	James D. Reigle	1957 – 1963
22	Wayland D. Tessar	1963 – 1969
23	Carl T. Freehauf --resigned--	1969 – June 16, 1969
24	Cyril N. Wietor Interim (1969-1971)	June 16, 1969 – 1973
25	Charles F. Miller	1973 – 1979
26	Robert A. Danielson --resigned--	1979 – March 1980
27	Gerald F. Stollenwerk Interim (1980-1981)	March 1980 – 1985
28	David E. Nigh	1985 – 1987
29	Paul E. Blumer --deceased--	1987 – December 25th, 1990
30	Mary L. Krueger Interim (1991-1991)	January 10th, 1991 – 1993
31	Robert H. Wagner	1993 – 2001
32	John D. Kenworthy	2001 – 2003
33	Mathew A. Heiser --resigned--	2003 – May 2008
34	Andrew Pesch Interim(2008-2009)	May 2008 – 2015
35	Kevin Scott Scheunemann --resigned--	2015 – 2022
36	David Spenner Interim	2022 – 2023
37	Michael "Fuzz" J. Martin --resigned--	2023 – July 20, 2026
38	Jim Hovland Interim --resigned--	July 27, 2026 – September 1, 2026
39	Mary Schlitt Interim	September 1, 2026 – present

=== List of administrators ===
#	Administrator	Tenure
1	Daniel S. Schmidt	1979 – July 2006
2	Jay Shambeau	July 2006 – June 2008
3	Mathew A. Heiser	June 2008 – June 2021
4	Adam Joseph Gitter	July 2021 – July 2026
5	Cassandra Hiller	September 2026 – present

=== Village President Election Results ===
Village President Elections
Year	Candidate	Votes	%	Notes
2005	Mathew A. Heiser (inc)	610	99.19%	Trustee (2000 – 2003)
2005	Write-Ins	5	0.81%	
2007	Mathew A. Heiser (inc)	519	99.05%	
2007	Write-Ins	5	0.95%	
2009	Andrew "Andy" Pesch (inc)	306	51.00%	Appointed Village President Pro Tem (2008 – 2009) after Mathew Heiser resigned; trustee (1997 – 2008)
2009	Kevin Scott Schuenemann	294	49.00%	Trustee (2001 – 2011) (2012 – 2015); local business owner
2011	Andrew "Andy" Pesch (inc)	562	54.94%	
2011	Craig Garbisch	452	44.18%	Trustee (2011 – 2014)
2011	Write-Ins	9	0.81%	
2013	Andrew "Andy" Pesch (inc)	505	99.21%	
2013	Write-Ins	4	0.79%	
2017	Kevin Scott Schuenemann (inc)	459	98.29%	
2017	Write-Ins	8	1.71%	
2019	Kevin Scott Schuenemann (inc)	799	98.52%	
2019	Write-Ins	12	1.48%	
2021	Kevin Scott Schuenemann (inc)	486	95.67%	
2021	Write-Ins	22	4.33%	
2023	Michael J. "Fuzz" Martin	1,029	98.94%	Local broadcaster and radio host. CSO of EPIC Creative in West Bend; trustee (2022 – 2023)
2023	Write-Ins	11	1.06%	

== Geography ==
The primary north–south highway serving Kewaskum is U.S. Route 45, and the primary east–west highway is Wisconsin Highway 28. Kewaskum is located in the 262 Area Code of south-eastern Wisconsin, with Prefix 626.

According to the United States Census Bureau, the village has a total area of 2.686 square miles (6.96 km^{2}), all land.

== Demographics ==
Historical population
Census	Pop.	Note	%±
1880	471		—
1890	557		18.3%
1900	679		21.9%
1910	625		−8.0%
1920	707		13.1%
1930	799		13.0%
1940	880		10.1%
1950	1,183		34.4%
1960	1,572		32.9%
1970	1,926		22.5%
1980	2,394		24.3%
1990	2,515		5.1%
2000	3,274		30.2%
2010	4,004		22.3%
2020	4,309		7.6%
2025 (est.)	4,561		5.8%
U.S. Decennial Census; 2020 Census

According to realtor website Zillow, the average price of a home as of September 30, 2026, in Kewaskum was $361,823.

As of the 2024 American Community Survey, there were 1,805 estimated households in Kewaskum with an average of 2.44 persons per household. The village has a median household income of $94,141. Approximately 10.8% of the village's population lives at or below the poverty line. Kewaskum has an estimated 62.0% employment rate, with 20.7% of the population holding a bachelor's degree or higher and 92.9% holding a high school diploma. There were 1,852 housing units at an average density of 266.22 per square mile (102.79/km^{2}).

The top five reported languages (people were allowed to report up to two languages, thus the figures will generally add to more than 100%) were English (96.5%), Spanish (3.0%), Indo-European (0.0%), Asian and Pacific Islander (0.4%), and Other (0.0%).

The median age in the village was 38.8 years.

Kewaskum, Wisconsin – racial and ethnic composition Note: the US Census treats Hispanic/Latino as an ethnic category. This table excludes Latinos from the racial categories and assigns them to a separate category. Hispanics/Latinos may be of any race.
Race / ethnicity (NH = non-Hispanic)	Pop. 1990	Pop. 2000	Pop. 2010	Pop. 2020	% 1990	% 2000	% 2010	% 2020
White alone (NH)	2,482	3,192	3,799	3,940	98.69%	97.50%	94.88%	91.44%
Black or African American alone (NH)	1	9	19	51	0.04%	0.27%	0.47%	1.18%
Native American or Alaska Native alone (NH)	5	6	10	9	0.20%	0.18%	0.25%	0.21%
Asian alone (NH)	5	12	22	32	0.20%	0.37%	0.55%	0.74%
Pacific Islander alone (NH)	—	0	2	3	—	0.00%	0.05%	0.07%
Other race alone (NH)	0	4	1	9	0.00%	0.12%	0.02%	0.21%
Mixed race or multiracial (NH)	—	21	34	132	—	0.64%	0.85%	3.06%
Hispanic or Latino (any race)	22	30	117	133	0.87%	0.92%	2.92%	3.09%
Total	2,515	3,274	4,004	4,309	100.00%	100.00%	100.00%	100.00%

=== 2020 census ===
As of the 2020 census, there were 4,309 people, 1,766 households, and 1,183 families residing in the village. The population density was 706.76 inhabitants per square mile (272.88/km^{2}). There were 1,813 housing units at an average density of 297.37 per square mile (114.82/km^{2}). The racial makeup of the village was 92.62% White, 1.18% African American, 0.26% Native American, 0.77% Asian, 0.07% Pacific Islander, 1.00% from some other races and 4.11% from two or more races. Hispanic or Latino people of any race were 3.09% of the population.

=== 2010 census ===
As of the 2010 census, there were 4,004 people, 1,581 households, and 1,148 families residing in the village. The population density was 632.03 inhabitants per square mile (244.03/km^{2}). There were 1,698 housing units at an average density of 268.03 per square mile (103.49/km^{2}). The racial makeup of the village was 96.03% White, 0.47% African American, 0.35% Native American, 0.55% Asian, 0.05% Pacific Islander, 1.22% from some other races and 1.32% from two or more races. Hispanic or Latino people of any race were 2.92% of the population.

There were 1,581 households, of which 35.3% had children under the age of 18 living with them, 57.9% were married couples living together, 10.0% had a female householder with no husband present, 4.7% had a male householder with no wife present, and 27.4% were non-families. 21.6% of all households were made up of individuals, and 8.3% had someone living alone who was 65 years of age or older. The average household size was 2.52 and the average family size was 2.92.

In the village, the population was spread out, with 25.4% under the age of 18, 7.1% from 18 to 24; 29.7%, from 25 to 44; 24.9% from 45 to 64, and 12.7% who were 65 years of age or older. The median age was 36.8 years. For every 100 females, there were _ males. For every 100 females age 18 and over, there were _ males.

The gender makeup of the village was 49.0% male and 51.0% female.

=== 2000 census ===
As of the 2000 census, there were 3,274 people, 1,212 households, and 895 families residing in the village. The population density was 856.11 inhabitants per square mile (330.55/km^{2}). There were 1,264 housing units at an average density of 330.52 per square mile (127.61/km^{2}). The racial makeup of the village was 97.95% White, 0.27% African American, 0.18% Native American, 0.37% Asian, 0.00% Pacific Islander, 0.37% from some other races and 0.86% from two or more races. Hispanic or Latino people of any race were 0.92% of the population.

There were 1,212 households, out of which 37.8% had children under the age of 18 living with them, 59.8% were married couples living together, 10.0% had a female householder with no husband present, and 26.1% were non-families. 21.1% of all households were made up of individuals, and 7.1% had someone living alone who was 65 years of age or older. The average household size was 2.64 and the average family size was 3.09.

In the village, the population was spread out, with 27.4% under the age of 18, 9.3% from 18 to 24; 31.7%, from 25 to 44; 19.5% from 45 to 64, and 12.0% who were 65 years of age or older. The median age was 33 years. For every 100 females, there were 97.3 males. For every 100 females age 18 and over, there were 94.8 males.

The median income for a household in the village was $49,861, and the median income for a family was $55,144. Males had a median income of $37,639 versus $25,806 for females. The per capita income for the village was $20,509. About 4.0% of families and 5.0% of the population were below the poverty line, including 4.0% of those under age 18 and 8.7% of those age 65 or over.

== Notable people ==
- Ty Bodden, Wisconsin state representative, previously lived in Kewaskum
- Louis D. Guth, Wisconsin state representative and businessman, lived in Kewaskum
- Kenneth William Haebig, Wisconsin state representative and lawyer, lived in Kewaskum
- Einar H. Ingman Jr., a Medal of Honor recipient, lived in Kewaskum
- Jesse Kremer, Wisconsin state representative, lived in Kewaskum
- Timothy Ramthun, Wisconsin state representative, lived in Kewaskum
- Jordan Stolz, American world champion and Olympic gold medalist speedskater, lives in the village
- A. Matt Werner, attorney and newspaper executive
- Glenway Wescott, author, born in Kewaskum

== See also ==
- List of villages in Wisconsin
