= Bob Gannon =

American politician and businessman (1959-2017)

Member of the Wisconsin State Assembly from the 58th district
- In office January 2015 – October 3, 2017
- Preceded by: Patricia Strachota
- Succeeded by: Rick Gundrum

Personal details
- Born: January 6, 1959 Mequon, Wisconsin, U.S.
- Died: October 3, 2017 (aged 58) West Bend, Wisconsin, U.S.
- Party: Republican
- Children: 2

Robert John Gannon (January 6, 1959 – October 3, 2017) was an American politician and businessman from West Bend, Wisconsin.

== Early life and education ==
Gannon was born in Mequon, Wisconsin on January 6, 1959. He graduated from the West Bend High School in West Bend, Wisconsin and attended various colleges and vocational schools.

== Career ==
He owned Richards Insurance Agency and AmericInn Hotel in West Bend. On November 4, 2014, Gannon was elected to the Wisconsin State Assembly as a Republican.

While discussing a shooting that took place at the East Towne Mall during a town hall meeting in 2015, Gannon criticized gun-free zones and called on concealed carry gun owners to "help clean our society of these scumbags." Representative Chris Taylor denounced his comments as a call "for a vigilante uprising."

In early January 2016, Gannon released a press release tying crime in Milwaukee to the city's economy. After receiving criticism over the press release from Peter Barca, Gannon gave Barca the finger on the floor of the Assembly.

== Death ==
Gannon died of natural causes on October 3, 2017, at the age of 58, leaving a wife and two children.
