= Washington County Courthouse and Jail =

- U.S. National Register of Historic Places
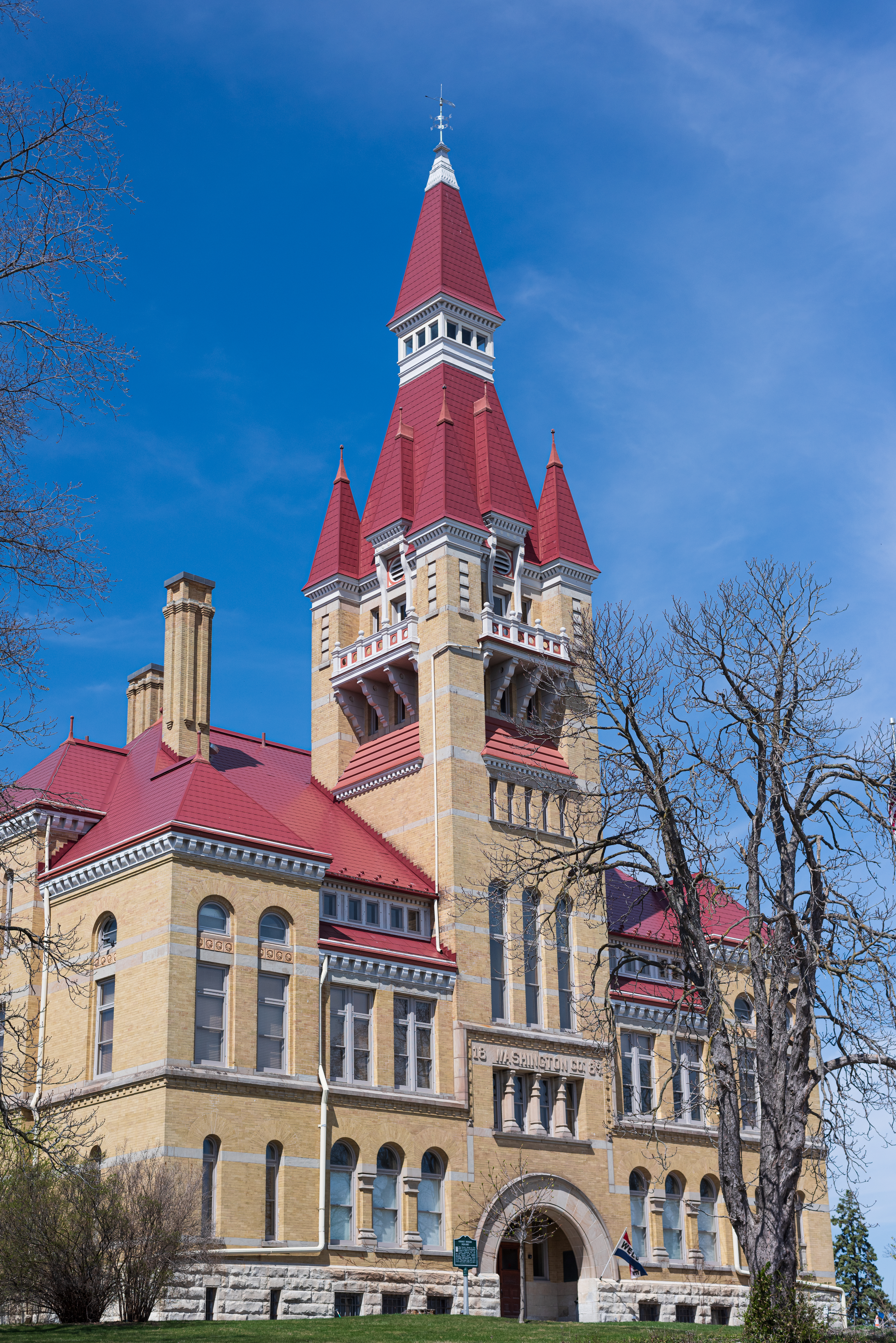
- Old Washington County Courthouse

- Location within Wisconsin
- Location: 320 S. 5th Ave., West Bend, Wisconsin
- Coordinates: 43°25′12″N 88°10′58″W
- Area: 2 acres (0.81 ha)
- Built: 1886
- Architect: E.V. Koch & Co.
- Architectural style: Queen Anne, Romanesque, Richardsonian Romanesque
- MPS: County Courthouses of Wisconsin TR
- NRHP reference No.: 82000718
- Added to NRHP: March 9, 1982

The Washington County Courthouse and Jail in West Bend, Wisconsin is the historic former courthouse of Washington County, Wisconsin. It now holds the Tower Heritage Center, a museum and research center operated by the Washington County Historical Society. The building was listed on the National Register of Historic Places in 1982.

It is a 3.5-story building with an 8-story central tower designed by Edward V. Koch in Richardsonian Romanesque style and built 1889–90, with 1886 jail. It served as courthouse until 1962.

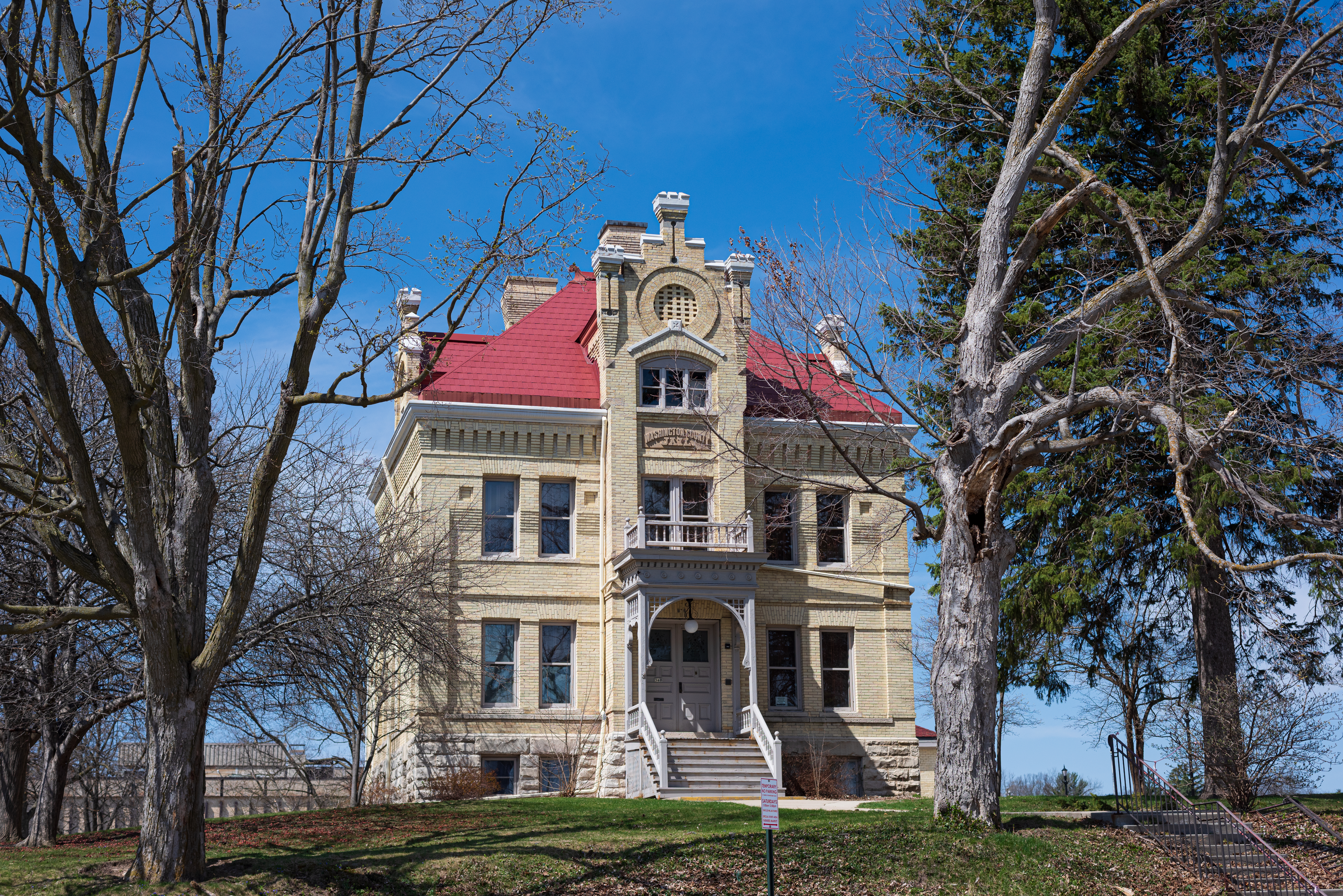
Old Sheriff's Residence and Jail
