= West Bend Housewares =

American household appliance brand

- Type: Home appliance brand
- Inception: 1960s
- Manufacturer: The Legacy Companies
- Models: Breadmakers; mixers; coffeemakers; slow cookers; woks

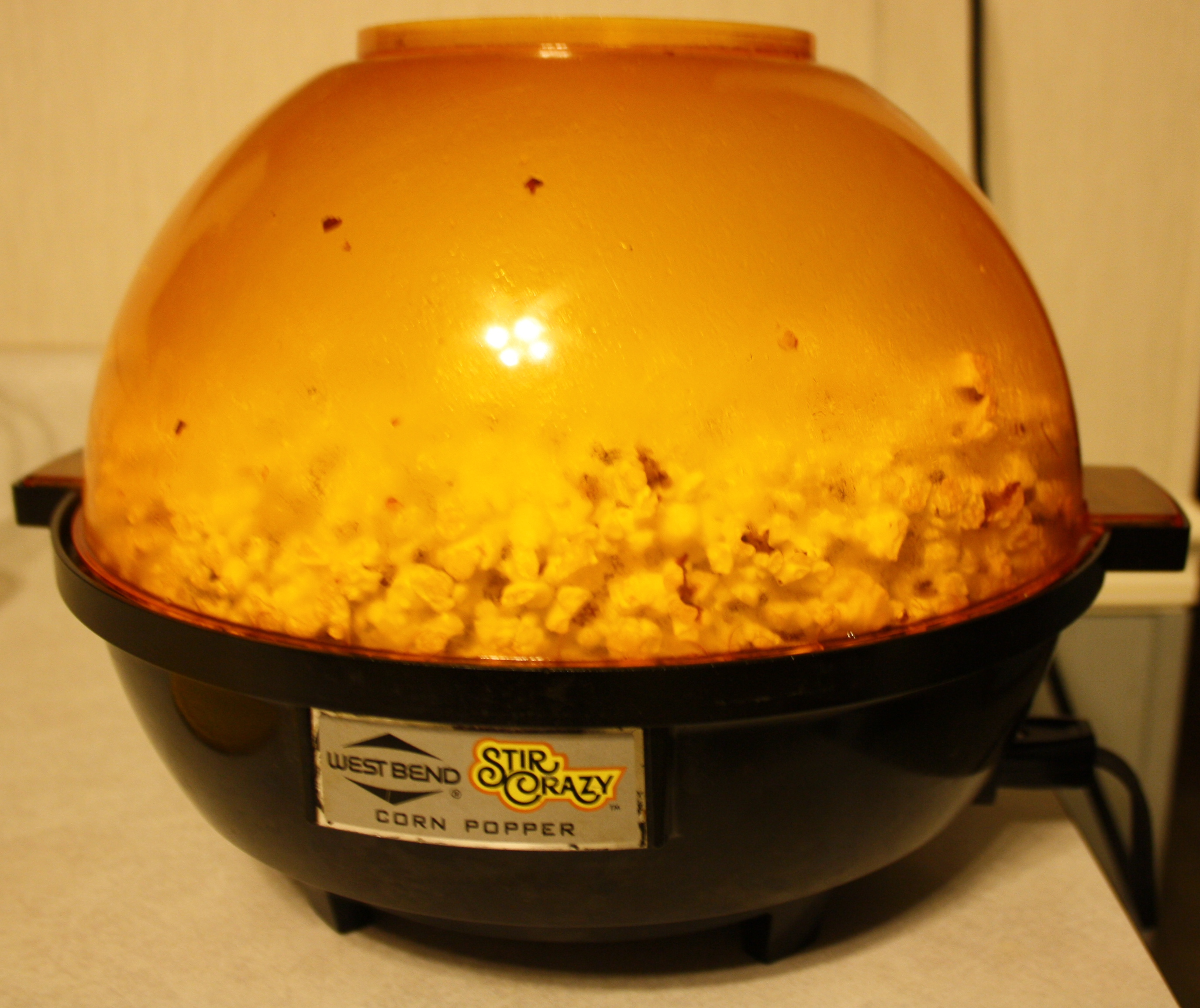
Stir Crazy popcorn popper

West Bend Housewares, LLC, produces household appliances including breadmakers, mixers, coffeemakers, slow cookers, and woks. The West Bend Company, founded in 1911, was purchased by Regal Ware Inc. in 2002. In 2003, the household appliances business was sold to Vernon Hills, Illinois-based Focus Products Group, which took the name West Bend Housewares.

Regal Ware, Inc. maintained control of West Bend Company’s cookware manufacturing operations, operating it as SynergyOps in the early-2020s and re-named it to West Bend Company in 2026.
