= B.C. Ziegler =

American investment banking firm

B.C. Ziegler and Company
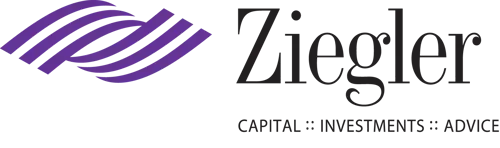
- Trade name: Ziegler
- Type: Private
- Industry: Financial services
- Founded: 1902; 124 years ago
- Founders: Bernhard C. Ziegler
- Headquarters: One North Wacker, Chicago, Illinois, United States
- Key people: Dan Hermann (President & CEO)
- Products: Investment banking Investment management Mortgage lending
- Parent: The Ziegler Companies, Inc.
- Website: www.ziegler.com

B.C. Ziegler and Company which uses the trade name Ziegler, is an American financial services company that is headquartered in Chicago, Illinois. The company is known for providing investment banking and investment management services related to senior living, healthcare and education.

== History ==
In 1902, 18-year-old Bernhard C. "Ben" Ziegler had been selling fire insurance policies in West Bend, Wisconsin to supplement his income as an assistant for the county's treasurer and recorder of deeds. That year, an insurance agency owned by a friend of Ben's father ran into financial trouble which lead to Ben taking over it and acting as its agent to sell insurance policies. This was the beginning of the Ziegler company.

By 1907, Ziegler had grown to encompass all of southeastern Wisconsin and its three largest cities. During the Panic of 1907, Ben withdrew his savings from the banks but afterwards instead of putting them back, he decided to make loans to local farmers. Ben has stated this was the real beginning of the investment business for Ziegler.

In 1913, Ziegler made a $30,000 bond issue to Holy Angels Church which was the first bond issue for the company and would start its institutional lending business.

In 1920, Ben incorporated his business as B.C. Ziegler and Company. By the early 1920s, Ziegler had become one of the Wisconsin's leading farm financing companies.

In 1928, Ziegler made its first institutional loan outside Wisconsin, a $485,000, 5 percent bond to the Missionary Sisters Servants of the Holy Spirit in Techny, Illinois. By the late 1920s Ziegler had over 5,000 customers.

Ben anticipated the Great Depression and ordered Ziegler to pay off its $300,000 in debt within 60 days. As a result, after the Wall Street Crash of 1929, Ziegler had a strong cash position with no liabilities. During the great depression, Ziegler's business grew and benefitted from lending to cash-strapped churches as people were afraid of everything except church bonds. Ziegler also lent money to educational institutions. In 1936, Ziegler made a $3.1 million issue to St. Mary's College and Academy and Marygrove College.

In May 1946, Ben died at age 62. At this point of time, his company's thriving institutional bond business was expanding throughout the United States through college and church loans. After World War II as millions of U.S. servicemen were coming back, Ziegler had used its property purchases to create homes that were ready to be sold to them. As a result, Ziegler updated its marketing network and in 1949 opened its first sales office in Milwaukee.

In 1964, Ziegler created a subsidiary named First Church Financing Corporation of America to handle collateral trust bonds. By 1965, the construction boom related to churches and education institute had peaked so Ziegler moved its focus towards hospitals. In 1969 Ziegler formed Ziegler Financing Corporation as an operating company to provide short-term construction loans for real estate projects.

In 1966, Thomas J. Kenny became the president of the company. In 1967, Ziegler became the sole distributor of a mutual fund based in Milwaukee and in 1970, launched its own family of mutual funds.

In December 1971, Ziegler formed the holding company, Ziegler Company, Inc. as it wanted to give its individual units free rein. Its stock was issued to the over-the-counter market.

In 1972, Kenny, also chairperson of the board, died with members of his family on Cathay Pacific Flight 700Z.

In 1973, Ziegler acquired a Chicago firm called Barcus, Kindred & Company that specialized in originating and underwriting municipal and nonprofit revenue bonds. In 1976, it was renamed to Ziegler Securities.

In 1991, Ziegler listed on the American Stock Exchange. It established two new subsidiaries: Ziegler Asset Management and Ziegler Collateralized Securities. In April 1993, the parent company was reincorporated in Wisconsin as The Ziegler Companies, Inc. Around this time, Ziegler transitioned from a "bonds only" house to a "full-service brokerage" and by 1994, started offering equity offerings. In July 1997, Ziegler acquired Glaisner, Schiffarth, Grande & Schnoll, a Milwaukee-based institutional equity sales, trading, and research firm. By the late 90s, Ziegler divested from some of its business lines so it could focus on its investment banking and investment management businesses.

In 2001, Ziegler moved its headquarters to Milwaukee to be closer to the financial center. In December 2003, Ziegler voluntarily delisted itself from the American Stock Exchange, and its shares would trade over-the-counter via the Pink Sheets electronic network. Reasons for delisting include low interest in the stock with few shareholders and limited trading volume as well as the high reporting costs which were made worse by the Sarbanes–Oxley Act.

During 2000s, Ziegler continued to focus on being a full-service brokerage and moved its headquarters to Chicago. In 2006, it started its M&A business.

In 2014, Ziegler became a private held firm. In the same year, Ziegler and Link-age Ventures launched a $26.6 million Ziegler Link-age Longevity Fund that would focus on companies providing healthcare to the aging market.

In 2018, Ziegler sold its wealth management business to Stifel to focus more on intuitional offerings.

In August 2024, The Charlotte Observer reported that Ziegler was arranging financing for Charter schools in North Carolina. In September 2024, The Vanguard Group, AllianceBernstein and Macquarie Group sued Ziegler stated they were defrauded by it after it underwrote $280 million of municipal securities for Legacy Park which went bankrupt leading to huge losses.
