= Rick Gundrum =

American politician and businessman

Member of the Wisconsin State Assembly from the 58th district
- Incumbent
- Assumed office January 24, 2018
- Preceded by: Bob Gannon
- Succeeded by: Bernie Newman (elect)

Personal details
- Born: Nenno, Wisconsin, U.S.
- Party: Republican
- Education: University of Wisconsin–Milwaukee (AS); University of Wisconsin–Oshkosh (BS)
- Website: Official website

Rick McKay Gundrum is an American politician and businessman. A Republican, he represents the 58th district of the Wisconsin State Assembly.

== Biography ==
Gundrum lives in Slinger, Wisconsin, and is the owner of McKay Enterprises, an audio-visual company. Gundrum served on the Slinger Village Board and on the Washington County Board of Supervisors. He served as chairman of the county board. Gundrum was elected to the Wisconsin Assembly in a special election on January 15, 2018, replacing Bob Gannon who died while in office in October 2017. Gundrum is a Republican.

Wisconsin State Assembly
Preceded by Bob Gannon	Member of the Wisconsin State Assembly from the 58th district January 24, 2018 – present	Incumbent
