= West Bend, Wisconsin =

City and county seat of Washington County, Wisconsin

- City
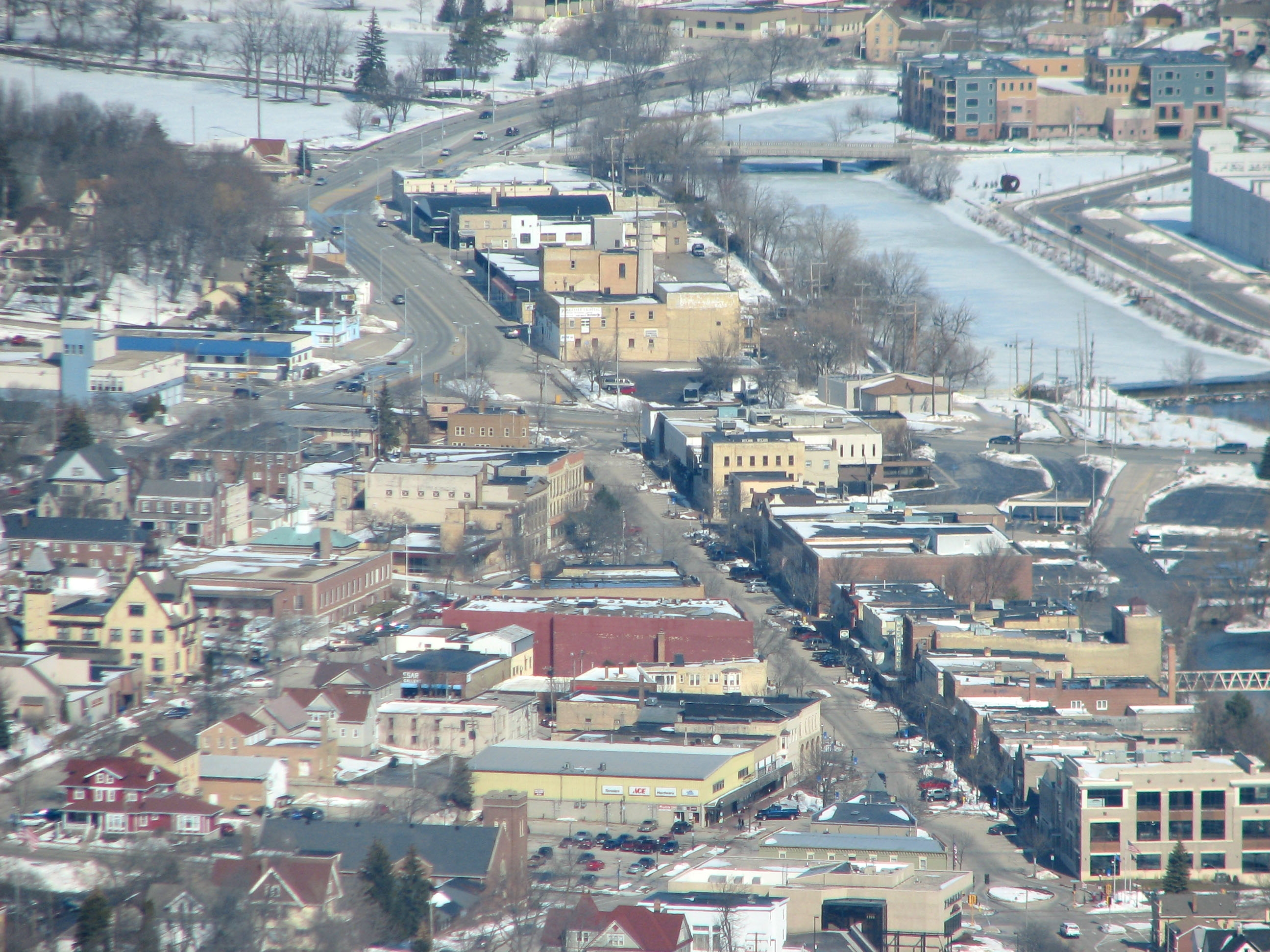
- Aerial view of downtown

- Seal

- Location of West Bend in Washington County, Wisconsin.

- Location in Wisconsin West Bend (the United States)
- Coordinates: 43°25′30″N 88°11′00″W
- Country: United States
- State: Wisconsin
- County: Washington
- Settled: 1845
- Incorporated (village): 1868
- Incorporated (city): 1885

Government
  - Mayor: Joel Ongert
  - Administrator: Jesse Thyes
  - Clerk: Jilline Dobratz
  - City council: Aldermen: Travis Prindl; Rhett Engelking; John Skidmore; Matt Sternig; Mary Beth Seiser; John Spartz; Justice Madl; Aaron Zingsheim

Area
  - Total: 15.30 sq mi (39.62 km^{2})
  - Land: 15.14 sq mi (39.22 km^{2})
  - Water: 0.15 sq mi (0.40 km^{2})
- Elevation: 932 ft (284 m)

Population (2020)
  - Total: 31,752
  - Density: 2,086.1/sq mi (805.46/km^{2})
- Time zone: UTC−6 (Central (CST))
  - Summer (DST): UTC−5 (CDT)
- ZIP Codes: 53090, 53095, 53096
- Area code: 262
- FIPS code: 55-85350
- Website: www.westbendwi.gov

West Bend is a city in Washington County, Wisconsin, United States, and its county seat. As of the 2020 census, the population was 31,752. It is part of the Milwaukee metropolitan area.

== History ==
=== Early history and settlement ===
Northeastern Washington County's earliest known inhabitants were pre-Columbian Mound Builders, who constructed effigy mounds in the area sometime between 650 CE and 1300 CE. They were semi-nomadic and survived by hunting, fishing, and gathering wild plants. They made pottery and constructed tools from bone, wood, stone, and occasionally copper. They built effigy mounds shaped like mammals, reptiles, birds and other creatures, both real and mythical, as well as conical, oval, and linear mounds, some of which contain human burials. Some mounds in the West Bend area were destroyed by settlers to create farm fields, but several dozen survive and are listed on the National Register of Historic Places as the Washington County "Island" Effigy Mound District, which includes the Lizard Mound County Park site in nearby Farmington as well as several privately owned sites.

In the early 19th century when the first White settlers arrived in Southeastern Wisconsin, the Potawatomi and Menominee Indians inhabited the land now occupied by the City of West Bend. In 1831, the Menominee surrendered their claims to the land to the United States Federal Government through the Treaty of Washington. The Potawatomi surrendered their land claims in 1833 through the 1833 Treaty of Chicago, which (after being ratified in 1835) required them to leave the area by 1838. While many Native people moved west of the Mississippi River to Kansas, some chose to remain, and were referred to as "strolling Potawatomi" in contemporary documents because many of them were migrants who subsisted by squatting on their ancestral lands, which were now owned by settlers. In the mid-1800s, there was a large Native American village on the shore of Silver Lake, southwest of the modern-day City of West Bend. Eventually the Potawatomi who evaded forced removal gathered in northern Wisconsin, where they formed the Forest County Potawatomi Community.

The present-day city traces its origins to two communities that formed when the first White settlers arrived in the mid-1840s. One community was West Bend, and the other was the now-defunct Village of Barton. In 1845, the Wisconsin Territorial Legislature authorized the construction of a road to connect Fond du Lac and Milwaukee with a new settlement near the halfway point to provide provisions and overnight accommodations for travelers. Byron Kilbourn, James Kneeland, and Erastus B. Wolcott were the commissioners tasked with constructing the new settlement, and they decided to locate it on a westward bend in the Milwaukee River—the present-day location of the City of West Bend—because of the river's potential as a power source for mills. By the end of 1845, they had purchased eight eighty-acre tracts of land along the river, and invited local landowner E. N. Higgins to join their venture as well. In 1846, Wolcott constructed a dam and a sawmill in the new community, and in 1848, he constructed a gristmill.

In 1845, land surveyor and early settler Barton Salisbury built a sawmill on the river north of West Bend. The community that grew around the mill was known as Salisbury's Mills before to the name was changed to Barton in 1853. Additional sawmills and gristmills sprang up on the river in the community's early years, and by 1855, Barton's population was over 1,000, making it larger than neighboring West Bend. Despite its early growth, however, Barton would be overshadowed by West Bend in the coming decades.

=== 19th century politics and growth ===
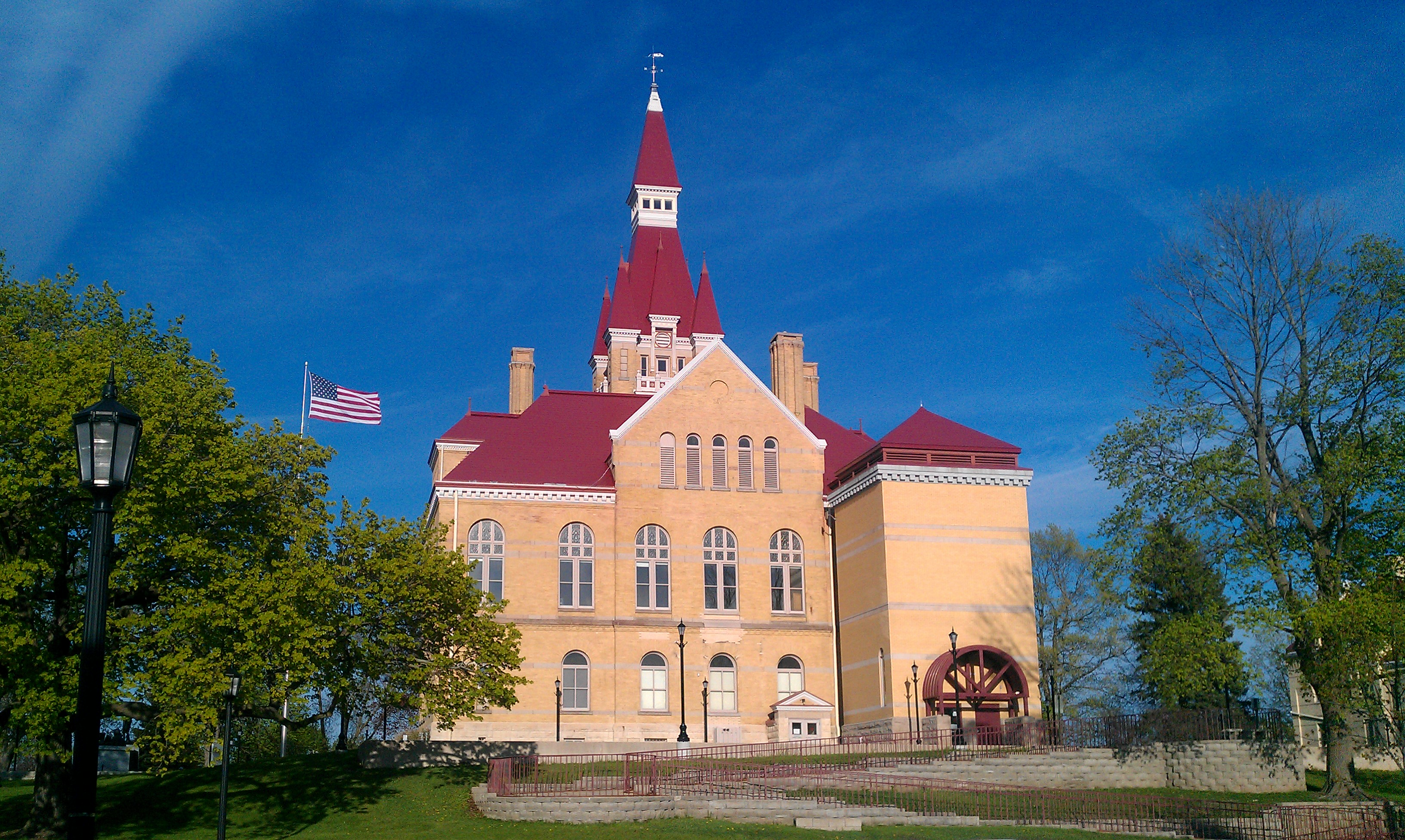
The old Washington County Courthouse and Jail was constructed in West Bend in 1889. The building was listed on the National Register of Historic Places in 1982 and now serves as a local history museum.

The Wisconsin Territorial legislature created the Town of West Bend on January 20, 1846. At the time, the town included land that is now part of the City of West Bend, as well as the neighboring towns of Barton, Farmington, Kewaskum, and Trenton.

In the 1840s and early 1850s, Washington County included the land along Lake Michigan that is now Ozaukee County, Wisconsin. Port Washington served as the county seat, which was controversial at the time. West Bend, Cedarburg, and Grafton vied for position of Washington County seat and the material advantages it would entail. In 1850, the Wisconsin legislature voted to bisected Washington County into northern and southern counties, with Port Washington and Cedarburg as the county seats, respectively. County residents failed to ratify the bill, because there were voting irregularities in some communities. In 1853 the legislature instead bisected the county into eastern and western sections, creating Ozaukee County. Port Washington became the seat of the new county, and the Washington County seat moved to West Bend. The bisection was controversial. When Washington County officials from West Bend arrived in Port Washington to collect relevant county records, they were run out of town, and Ozaukee County officials refused to hand over the records for several months.

On November 25, 1853, the County Board of Supervisors attempted to change the name of West Bend to Lamartine City. However, this change was not well-received and the name was changed back 18 hours later.

In November 1862 during the American Civil War, the draft was unpopular with some Washington County residents, including German immigrants who had experienced or fled conscription in their homelands. On the day that men from the nearby Town of Trenton were being drafted at the courthouse in West Bend, a mob disrupted the proceedings and forced the draft commissioner to flee to Milwaukee. On November 22, 1862, the commissioner returned to West Bend with six companies of the 30th Wisconsin Volunteer Infantry Regiment to prevent further disruptions.

West Bend was incorporated as a village in 1868. railroad station was constructed in West Bend in 1873, bringing new residents, businesses and economic connections into the community. The community had previously only been located on the western bank of the Milwaukee River, but in the 1870s residents began to develop property on the river's eastern bank as well. In March 1885, West Bend incorporated as a city.

=== Industrialization and post-war growth ===
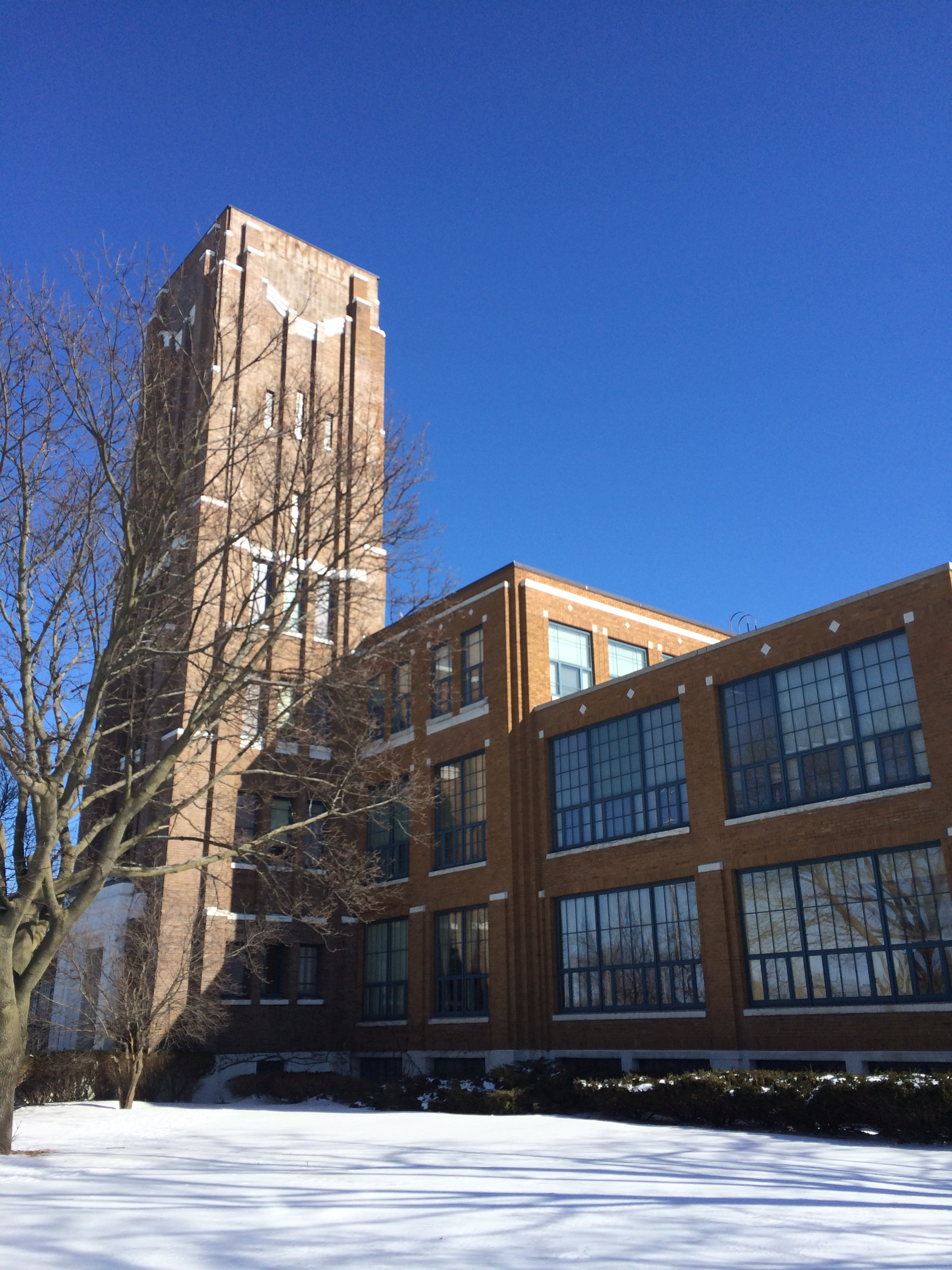
Amity Leather Products manufactured leather billfolds in West Bend between 1915 and 1996. The company constructed an Art Deco factory in the city in 1925, which is listed on the National Register of Historic Places.

In the 1890s, West Bend's economy began to transition from a rural market town to an industrial community. Early manufacturers included the Schmidt and Stork Wagon Company; the Enger-Kress Pocketbook Company, which moved its operations to West Bend in 1884; the West Bend Aluminum Company, which began manufacturing low-cost aluminum utensils in 1911; and Amity Leather, which was founded in West Bend in 1915 and was once the world's largest manufacturer of leather billfolds. Other 20th century manufacturers in West Bend included Pick Manufacturing Company, which fabricated automotive parts; Gehl Brothers Manufacturing Company, which produced construction and agricultural equipment; and West Bend Concrete Products.

Barton also benefited from West Bend's growth in the early 20th century, and the community incorporated as the Village of Barton in 1925. However, the village existed for fewer than four decades before being annexed by the City of West Bend on November 1, 1961.

During World War II, West Bend experienced labor shortages because many local men had been conscripted into the military. In 1944 and 1945, Pick Manufacturing Company and the West Bend Canning Company addressed labor shortages by contracting German prisoners of war from local POW camps in Little Kohler and Rockfield.

West Bend experienced dramatic population growth during the post–World War II economic expansion. As automobiles became more commonplace, more people moved to West Bend and commuted for work, taking advantage of new roads such as U.S. Route 45, which connected West Bend to Milwaukee. Between 1950 and 1990 the population more than tripled from 6,849 to 23,916, and the city annexed land from the surrounding towns as well as the Village of Barton.

Seven people from West Bend were on board Cathay Pacific Flight 700Z, which crashed in South Vietnam, on June 15, 1972, due to a bomb. The West Bend passengers included the CEO of B.C. Ziegler Company, his wife, four of their children, and a family friend. John Torinus, editor of the West Bend Daily News in the 1970s, called it "West Bend's greatest tragedy".

The West Bend tornado on April 4, 1981, struck the city, killing three people directly and three indirectly (totaling six deaths), and injuring either 53 or more than 100 (estimates from different sources differ). There is a monument at a park near Green Tree Elementary School.

==== Library controversy ====
In 2009, a controversy arose after a local couple complained to the West Bend Community Memorial Library about the presence of "sexually explicit books" and "books for youth on homosexuality" in the young adult section of the library. A petition called on the library to label the identified books as explicit, move them to the adult section of the library, install Internet content filters on the library's computers, and "adopt a policy to attain balance in the viewpoints of selections (both affirming and opposing) that the libraries carry in issues sufficiently controversial within the West Bend community (i.e. homosexuality). Specifically, we request faith-based and/or ex-gay books affirming traditional heterosexual perspectives be added to the library."

The West Bend Common Council refused to reappoint four library trustees whose terms were ending. One councilman complained that the library board was stonewalling the complaint, while another asserted that the library trustees were not serving the interests of the community “with their ideology.” The council's actions were widely criticized, and local citizens unsuccessfully sought to have the vote rescinded. After a public hearing on the petition in June 2009, the library board voted to reject any restrictions on young adults' access to books in the library.

Four Wisconsin men belonging to the Christian Civil Liberties Union filed a claim against the West Bend library, asking for $30,000 apiece for "emotional distress", and that Francesca Lia Block's book Baby Be-Bop be "burned or destroyed."

=== Historic sites ===
The Washington County Historical Society operates four distinct museums located in West Bend. Buildings and sites that have been deemed historic by official bodies include:

- Old Courthouse Museum
- Old Sheriff's Residence and Jail
- West Bend Company/Regal Ware Museum
- Father Rehrl's Rectory at St. Agnes Historic Site

Downtown West Bend has a movie theater which originally opened in 1929. The theater was last renovated in 1992 to house a total of three movie screens. The theater was closed and listed for sale in January 2012, with a purchase occurring in May 2012. The movie theatre has since reopened and hosts many plays and movies. It is now being advertised as "The Bend."

== Geography ==
According to the United States Census Bureau, the city has a total area of 14.72 square miles (38.12 km^{2}), of which 14.57 square miles (37.74 km^{2}) is land and 0.15 square miles (0.39 km^{2}) is water.

West Bend is in the Kettle Moraine region, and its topography is varied. The glacial activity has formed many kettles and hills throughout the region.

=== Climate ===
The average temperature in West Bend ranges from a high of 81 °F (27 °C) (July) to a low average temperature of 11 °F (−12 °C) (January). Record high and low temperatures are 107 °F (42 °C) and −30 °F (−34 °C), respectively. The average annual rainfall is 31.4 in (800 mm). The average annual snow measures 45.6 in (1,160 mm).

== Demographics ==
Historical population
| Census | Pop. | Note | %± |
|---|---|---|---|
| 1870 | 1,058 | | — |
| 1880 | 1,273 | | 20.3% |
| 1890 | 1,296 | | 1.8% |
| 1900 | 2,119 | | 63.5% |
| 1910 | 2,462 | | 16.2% |
| 1920 | 3,378 | | 37.2% |
| 1930 | 4,760 | | 40.9% |
| 1940 | 5,452 | | 14.5% |
| 1950 | 6,849 | | 25.6% |
| 1960 | 9,969 | | 45.6% |
| 1970 | 16,555 | | 66.1% |
| 1980 | 21,484 | | 29.8% |
| 1990 | 23,916 | | 11.3% |
| 2000 | 28,152 | | 17.7% |
| 2010 | 31,078 | | 10.4% |
| 2020 | 31,752 | | 2.2% |
U.S. Decennial Census

=== 2020 census ===
As of the 2020 census, West Bend had a population of 31,752. The median age was 40.6 years. 22.0% of residents were under the age of 18 and 19.4% of residents were 65 years of age or older. For every 100 females there were 94.8 males, and for every 100 females age 18 and over there were 92.5 males age 18 and over.

99.8% of residents lived in urban areas, while 0.2% lived in rural areas.

There were 13,749 households in West Bend, of which 26.9% had children under the age of 18 living in them. Of all households, 45.1% were married-couple households, 18.8% were households with a male householder and no spouse or partner present, and 28.5% were households with a female householder and no spouse or partner present. About 33.7% of all households were made up of individuals and 15.1% had someone living alone who was 65 years of age or older.

There were 14,300 housing units, of which 3.9% were vacant. The homeowner vacancy rate was 0.5% and the rental vacancy rate was 5.5%.

Racial composition as of the 2020 census
| Race | Number | Percent |
|---|---|---|
| White | 28,585 | 90.0% |
| Black or African American | 566 | 1.8% |
| American Indian and Alaska Native | 128 | 0.4% |
| Asian | 345 | 1.1% |
| Native Hawaiian and Other Pacific Islander | 9 | 0.0% |
| Some other race | 482 | 1.5% |
| Two or more races | 1,637 | 5.2% |
| Hispanic or Latino (of any race) | 1,556 | 4.9% |

=== 2010 census ===
As of the 2010 census, there were 31,078 people, 12,769 households, and 8,250 families residing in the city. The population density was 2,133.0 inhabitants per square mile (823.6/km^{2}). There were 13,546 housing units at an average density of 929.7 units per square mile (359.0 units/km^{2}). The racial makeup of the city was 94.77% White, 1.61% African American, 0.05% Native American, 0.83% Asian, 1.38% from other races, and 1.35% from two or more races. Hispanic or Latino of any race were 3.9% of the population.

There were 12,769 households, of which 32.4% had children under the age of 18 living with them, 50.1% were married couples living together, 10.0% had a female householder with no husband present, 4.4% had a male householder with no wife present, and 35.4% were non-families. 29.2% of all households were made up of individuals, and 12.4% had someone living alone who was 65 years of age or older. The average household size was 2.39 and the average family size was 2.96.

The median age in the city was 37 years. 24.7% of residents were under the age of 18; 7.4% were between the ages of 18 and 24; 28.9% were from 25 to 44; 24.3% were from 45 to 64; and 14.6% were 65 years of age or older. The gender makeup of the city was 48.3% male and 51.7% female.

== Economy ==
Although many current residents of West Bend work in neighboring communities, the city's economy has been historically based in manufacturing and financial services. West Bend Mutual Insurance Company was founded in the city in 1894 and West Bend Savings Bank (now Westbury Bank) in 1926. The West Bend Aluminum Company (later the West Bend Company) was founded in 1911 by Bernhard C. Ziegler, and remained in West Bend until 2003. Ziegler had previously founded the securities brokerage company B.C. Ziegler in 1902. Ziegler would later run for Mayor in 1914.

In 1915, Robert H. Rolfs founded Amity Leather in downtown West Bend, which eventually became the world's largest manufacturer of leather billfolds. Amity Leather left the city in 1996. The strong economy in West Bend in the 1930s led Ripley's Believe it or Not to claim that West Bend was the only city in the United States that did not enter the Great Depression. In 1949, the printing company Serigraph, Inc. was founded in a garage in West Bend and went on to employ people all over the world. The Gehl Company is also located in West Bend.

=== Military ===
The Army National Guard operates an armory near the airport, at 125 Chopper Drive, West Bend.

== Recreation and tourism ==
A paved riverwalk snakes through the city along the banks of the Milwaukee River. The Eisenbahn State Trail, a Rails to Trails project, has added another trail for walking, running, biking, and roller skating. The 1,000-mile National Ice Age Trail crosses through West Bend. West Bend also has over 1,200 acres of parks and green space.

Just north of downtown is Regner Park, which offers a wooded area for hiking, a baseball diamond, a community swimming pond with a beach, a fishing pond, and several softball and soccer fields. On the southeast side of the city is Quaas Creek Park, home to the Roman "Doc" Gonring Athletic Complex and Quaas Creek Trail. This facility includes scenic bike/pedestrian trails, a canoe launch, three softball fields with two concession stands, and a children's play area. Lac Lawrann Conservancy, offers a 137-acre nature preserve and 5 miles of trails.

A farmers' market is held in Downtown West Bend on Saturday mornings from May through October each year. The market is one of the largest in Southeastern Wisconsin. It includes entertainment from various sources and boasts over 65 vendors, selling produce, fruits, meats, eggs, maple syrup, bakery items, spices, soaps, herbal products, prepared foods and more. It was listed as a favorite farmers' market in Vogue magazine.

Entertainment on Thursday nights in the summer is provided by Music on Main. The street in Downtown West Bend is closed to traffic and a different band takes the stage at Old Settler's Park each week. One local restaurant is designated each week to provide food and beverages for purchase.

Maxwell Street Days and German Fest are two summer events held in the downtown. Riverfest (formerly Seafood Fest) is held every year at Regner Park on the first weekend in June. A more recent annual event in Riverside Park is JazzFest.

West Bend has been branded the “Geocaching Capital of the Midwest™,“ boasting over 1,200 caches within a 10-mile radius of the city. An annual "Cache Ba$h" has been sponsored by the West Bend Area Chamber of Commerce since 2008.

A holiday light show, Enchantment in the Park, was moved to Regner Park in West Bend in 2012 (previously it was hosted at the Washington County Fair Park). The event accepts donations to support local food pantries. The event also includes an opportunity to visit Santa and ice skating on the pond at Regner Park.

West Bend is also home of the Museum of Wisconsin Art, an art museum dedicated to showing the works of Wisconsin artists.

The Washington County Fair Park and Conference Center is located five miles south of the city. Numerous events are held throughout the year, including the Washington County Fair. The facility was built in 1999 and has a 24,000 sq. ft. pavilion, Agricultural and Equestrian Complexes and theater entertainment areas.

== Government ==
The city is governed by the City Council, consisting of the mayor and eight aldermen. Each alderman's term lasts two years. Aldermanic elections are held every spring, wherein half of the current seats are up for election. Every three years, the mayoral election is included in the spring elections. The City of West Bend created a BID Board on January 1st, 2001 for their downtown area. West Bend was a village from 1868 until being incorporated as a city in 1885. During that time they had Village Presidents instead of Mayors. The term for Village President was one year.

List Of Village Presidents
| Village President | Term in Office |
|---|---|
| John Shelley | 1868 – 1870 |
| George H. Kleffler | 1870 – 1871 |
| John Shelley | 1871/1872 – 1873 |
| Albert Semler | 1873 – 1874 |
| Christopher Eckstein | 1874 – 1876 |
| Leander F. Frisby | 1876 – 1877 |
| Fred H. Haase | 1877 – 1879 |
| George F. Hunt | 1879 – 1881 |
| John Reisse | 1881 – 1882 |
| Fred H. Haase | 1882 – 1883 |
| John Shelley | 1883 – 1884 |
| John Potter Jr. Office Disestablished | 1884 – 1885 |

List Of Mayors
| Mayor | | Term in Office |
|---|---|---|
| 1 | John Potter Jr | 1885 – 1886 |
| 2 | Henry Lemke | 1886 – 1887 |
| 3 | Barnabas S Potter --resigned-- | 1887 – Nov. 30th, 1887 |
| 4 | Patrick O'Meara | Dec. 1887 – 1888 |
| 5 | Charles H. Miller | 1888 – 1894 |
| 6 | Patrick O'Meara | 1894 – 1896 |
| 7 | Joseph Ott | 1896 – 1899 |
| 8 | Ernst Franckenberg | 1899 – 1901 |
| 9 | Joseph Ott | 1901 – 1906 |
| 10 | Albert E. Gray | 1906 – 1908 |
| 11 | Andrew Pick --Deceased-- | 1908 – August 1, 1910 |
| 12 | William C. Bratz | August 1, 1910 – 1916 |
| 13 | Joseph F. Huber | 1916 – 1920 |
| 14 | Frank Schoenbeck | 1920 – 1926 |
| 15 | Henry O. Regner | 1926 – 1930 |
| 16 | Joseph M. Knippel | 1930 – 1940 |
| 17 | Clyde J. Schloemer | 1940 – 1948 |
| 18 | Micheal Gehl | 1948 – April 6th 1954 |
| 19 | Walter Schmidt | April 6th 1954 – April 7th 1960 |
| 20 | Paul Henke | April 7th 1960 – April 3rd 1966 |
| 21 | Ralph Schoenhaar | April 3rd 1966 – 1978 |
| 22 | John Pick | 1978 – 1981 |
| 23 | Donald Gonring | 1981 – 1987 |
| 24 | Micheal R. Miller | 1987 – 2005 |
| 25 | Doug Bade --Resigned-- | 2005 – June 10, 2007 |
| 26 | Kristine Deiss | June 10, 2007 – April 20th, 2011 |
| 27 | Kraig Sadownikow --Resigned-- | April 20, 2011 – November 4th, 2019 |
| 28 | Steve Hoogester Interim Mayor | November 4, 2019 – April 21st, 2020 |
| 29 | Christophe E. Jenkins | April 21, 2020 – April 18th 2023 |
| 30 | Joel Ongert | April 18, 2023 – Incumbent |

=== List of City Administrators ===
City Administrators
| Name | Tenure |
| Richard Maslowski | Aug. 1976 - Jan. 1980 |
| James W. Lincoln | Jul. 1980 - Nov. 1980 |
| John Meyer | Nov. 1980 - 1984 |
| Dennis Melvin | Jun. 1984 - Dec. 2012 |
| Thomas M. "TJ" Justice | 2012 - 2016 |
| Jay Shambeau | 2016 - 2025 |
| Jesse Thyes | 2025 - |

=== List of Alderman ===
District 1 Alderman
| Name | Tenure |
| Doug Bade --resigned-- | ? - 2005 |
| Kristine M. Deiss --resigned-- | 2005 - 2007 |
| Roy Justman | 2007 - 2008 |
| Tony Turner | 2008 - 2014 |
| John Butschlick | 2014 - 2026 |
| Travis Prindl | 2026 - |

District 2 Alderman
| Name | Tenure |
| Thomas F. O'Meara III | 1992 - 2005 |
| Dave Krochalk | 2005 - 2009 |
| Steve Hutchins --resigned-- | 2009 - 2018 |
| Micheal A. Christian | 2018 - 2019 |
| Mark Allen | 2019 - 2025 |
| Rhett Engelking | 2025 - |

District 3 Alderman
| Name | Tenure |
| King J. Riffel | 2002 - 2008 |
| Richard W. Lindbeck | 2008 - 2010 |
| Ed Duquaine | 2010 - 2016 |
| Mike Chevalier | 2016 - 2018 |
| Andrew Chevalier | 2018 - 2020 |
| Brett A. Bergquist | 2020 - 2026 |
| John Skidmore | 2026 - |

District 4 Alderman
| Name | Tenure |
| Glenn G. Goodearle | ? - 2007 |
| Nick Dobberstein | 2007 - 2011 |
| Randy Koehler | 2011 - 2017 |
| Christophe E. Jenkins --resigned-- | 2017 - 2020 |
| Randy Koehler | 2020 - 2023 |
| Matt Sternig | 2023 - |

District 5 Alderman
| Name | Tenure |
| Allen Carter | ? - 2014 |
| Rich Kasten | 2014 - 2020 |
| Jed Dolnick | 2020 - 2024 |
| Mary Beth Seiser | 2024 - |

District 6 Alderman
| Name | Tenure |
| Micheal Schlotfeldt | ? - 2013 |
| Steve E. Hoogester --resigned-- | 2013 - 2019 |
| Vacant | 2019 - 2020 |
| Steve E. Hoogester --deceased-- | 2020 - 2020 |
| Vacant | 2020 - 2021 |
| Tracy Ahrens | 2021 - 2023 |
| John Spartz | 2023 - |

District 7 Alderman
| Name | Tenure |
| Terry Vrana | ? - 2010 |
| Deb Anderson | 2010 - 2012 |
| Adam D. Williquette | 2012 - 2018 |
| Justice Madl | 2018 - 2024 |
| Bill Schmidt | 2024 - 2026 |
| Justice Madl | 2026 - |

District 8 Alderman
| Name | Tenure |
| Scott Frederick | ? - 2009 |
| Roger Kist --resigned-- | 2009 - 2020 |
| Meghann Kennedy --resigned-- | 2020 - 2022 |
| Aaron Zingshiem | 2022 - |

=== Mayoral Election Results ===
Mayoral Elections
| Year | Candidate | Votes | % | Notes |
| 1885 | John Potter Jr. | 225 | 100% | Last Village President of West Bend (1884 - 1885) |
| 1886 | Henry Lemke | 83 | 69.74% | |
| 1886 | A. Frankenberg | 36 | 30.26% | |
| 1893 | Charles Miller (inc) | ? | >50% | |
| 1893 | W. P. Rix | ? | <50% | |
| 1896 | Joseph Ott | 415 | 100% | |
| 1899 | Henry Koepke | 206 | 43.36% | |
| 1899 | Ernst Frankenberg | 269 | 56.63% | |
| 1901 | Joseph Ott | 349 | 100% | |
| 1908 | Andrew Pick | 287 | 58.45% | Partner in Pick Brother Co. (Today known as Pick Heaters). Member of the city staff |
| 1908 | Albert E. Gray (inc) | 204 | 41.54% | |
| 1912 | William G. Bratz (inc) | 298 | 57.75% | Appointed as interim mayor in 1910 after Andrew Pick died of typhoid fever. Alderman since 1894 |
| 1912 | Peter Lochen | 218 | 42.24% | Alderman. Member of the Wisconsin State Senate. |
| 1914 | William G. Bratz (inc) | 215 | 36.81% | |
| 1914 | Lorenz Guth | 175 | 29.96% | Brother of Louis D. Guth |
| 1914 | Bernhard Carl Ziegler | 194 | 33.21% | Founder of West Bend Company |
| 1916 | Joseph F. Huber | 586 | 100% | |
| 1918 | Joseph F. Huber (inc) | 531 | 80.45% | |
| 1918 | Robert H. Rolfs | 129 | 19.54% | Founder of Amity Co. |
| 1920 | Frank Schoenbeck | 572 | 100% | Alderman |
| 1922 | Frank Schoenbeck (inc) | 769 | 74.87% | |
| 1922 | Joseph M. O'Meara | 258 | 25.12% | Alderman. Son of Patrick O'Meara (4th and 6th Mayor) |
| 1924 | Frank Schoenbeck (inc) | 549 | 59.35% | |
| 1924 | Rudolph F. Jackel | 243 | 26.27% | |
| 1924 | Abe Herman | 133 | 14.37% | |
| 1926 | Henry O. Regner | 675 | 58.49% | Regner notably has a park named after him in West Bend. Described in the local newspaper as "young, progressive and aggressive" |
| 1926 | Frank Schoenbeck (inc) | 479 | 41.50% | |
| 1928 | Henry O. Regner (inc) | 832 | 100% | |
| 1930 | Joseph M. Knippel | 855 | 67.64% | Alderman |
| 1930 | George J. Obermeyer Sr. | 409 | 32.35% | |
| 1932 | Joseph M. Knippel (inc) | 1,127 | 100% | |
| 1934 | Joseph M. Knippel (inc) | 1,142 | 79.58% | |
| 1934 | George J. Obermeyer Sr. | 293 | 20.42% | |
| 1936 | Joseph M. Knippel (inc) | 1,167 | 64.54%% | |
| 1936 | Edward Tessman | 641 | 35.45% | |
| 1938 | Joseph M. Knippel (inc) | 1,074 | 68.36% | |
| 1938 | John P. "Turk" Wiskirchen | 497 | 31.63% | |
| 1940 | Joseph M. Knippel (inc) | 949 | 43.37% | |
| 1940 | Clyde J. Schloemer | 1,234 | 56.62% | Founder of Schloemer Law Firm. Prominent preacher on political/religious subjects |
| 1942 | Clyde J. Schloemer (inc) | 576 | 100% | |
| 1944 | Clyde J. Schloemer (inc) | 656 | 98.64% | |
| 1944 | Scattering | 9 | 1.36% | |
| 1946 | Clyde J. Schloemer (inc) | 501 | 100% | |
| 1948 | Michael L. Gehl | 1,315 | 96.33% | Related to the Gehl Company |
| 1948 | Scattering | 50 | 3.67% | |
| 1950 | Michael L. Gehl (inc) | 1,896 | 100% | |
| 1952 | Michael L. Gehl (inc) | 2,671 | 100% | |
| 1954 | Walter Schmidt | 1,462 | 54.63% | Alderman |
| 1954 | Deane Bascom | 1,214 | 45.37% | Alderman. Member of Washington County Board |
| 1956 | Walter Schmidt (inc) | ? | >50% | |
| 1958 | Walter Schmidt (inc) | 1,578 | 100% | |
| 1960 | Walter Schmidt (inc) | 1,396 | 39.14% | |
| 1960 | Paul M. Henke Sr. | 2,170 | 60.85% | Alderman since 1957 |
| 1962 | Walter Schmidt | 1,398 | 49.97% | Demanded a recount 3 separate times. Originally Henke won with a 7 vote lead, but each recount decreased that number to eventually 2 after Schmidt took his complaint to the Wisconsin Supreme Court. |
| 1962 | Paul M. Henke Sr. (inc) | 1,400 | 50.03% | |
| 1964 | Walter Schmidt | 1957 | 45.80% | |
| 1964 | Paul M. Henke Sr. (inc) | 2316 | 54.20% | |
| 1966 | Ralph "Shorts" Schoenhaar | 1,766 | 50.86% | Alderman |
| 1966 | Paul M. Henke Sr. (inc) | 1,706 | 49.13% | |
| 1968 | Ralph "Shorts" Schoenhaar (inc) | 2453 | 51.10% | |
| 1968 | Paul M. Henke Sr. | 2347 | 49.90% | |
| 1970 | Ralph "Shorts" Schoenhaar (inc) | 1747 | 42.48% | |
| 1970 | Roland P. Jaeger | 1685 | 40.97% | Alderman |
| 1970 | Robert N. Wolf | 680 | 16.53% | "political newcomer" |
| 1972 | Ralph "Shorts" Schoenhaar (inc) | 2808 | 50.65% | |
| 1972 | Paul M. Henke Sr. | 2735 | 49.45% | |
| 1974 | Ralph "Shorts" Schoenhaar (inc) | 2449 | 52.23% | |
| 1974 | Marvin Huberty | 2240 | 47.77% | |
| 1976 | Ralph "Shorts" Schoenhaar (inc) | 3322 | 55.55% | |
| 1976 | Harvey Larson | 2658 | 44.45% | West Bend School Board Member for 10 years |
| 1978 | John M. Pick | 2763 | 52.02% | Alderman since 1966. Pick's great uncle was the 11th mayor Andrew Pick |
| 1978 | Donald L. Gonring | 2549 | 47.98% | Alderman since 1976 |
| 1981 | William Oelhafen | ? | 48.00% | Former West Bend fire chief |
| 1981 | Donald L. Gonring | ? | 52.00% | |
| 1984 | McKay Schwalbach | 2332 | 46.20% | |
| 1984 | Donald L. Gonring (inc) | 2716 | 53.80% | an ethics complaint against Gonring came out around the election and made Gonring a more controversial figure, splitting the incumbent alderman on who they supported. Endorsed by future mayor Mike Miller |
| 1987 | Michael R. Miller | 3525 | 58.67% | Alderman (1976 - 1984) |
| 1987 | Donald L. Gonring (inc) | 2483 | 41.32% | |
| 1990 | Michael R. Miller (inc) | ? | >50% | |
| 1993 | Michael R. Miller (inc) | 3918 | 81.05% | |
| 1993 | Helene M. Kocher | 916 | 18.94% | Alderman |
| 1999 | Michael R. Miller (inc) | ? | >50% | |
| 2002 | Michael R. Miller (inc) | ? | >50% | |
| 2002 | Thomas F. O'Meara III | ? | <50% | District 2 Alderman (1992 - 2005). He is the great-grandson of 4th and 6th Mayor Patrick O'Meara, as well as 11th Mayor, Andrew Pick. O'Meara's uncle is Andrew Pick O'Meara |
| 2005 | Doug Bade | 2,144 | 55.43% | District 1 Alderman |
| 2005 | Thomas F. O'Meara III | 1,692 | 43.74% | |
| 2005 | Write-Ins | 32 | 0.82% | |
| 2008 | Kristine Deiss (inc) | 2,672 | 59.09% | Appointed Interim Mayor after Doug Bade Resigned in 2007. District 1 Alderman (2005 - 2007) |
| 2008 | Michael A. Christian | 1,837 | 40.62% | Heavily involved in West Bend Historical Society |
| 2008 | Write-Ins | 13 | 0.29% | |
| 2011 | Kristine Deiss (inc) | 2,542 | 32.04% | |
| 2011 | Kraig Sadownikow | 5,366 | 67.63% | CEO of American Companies (active developer) |
| 2011 | Write-Ins | 26 | 0.33% | |
| 2014 | Kraig Sadownikow (inc) | 1,835 | 63.96% | |
| 2014 | Roger Kist | 1,026 | 35.75% | District 8 Alderman (2009 - 2020). Chairman of Washington County Republicans |
| 2014 | Write-Ins | 8 | 0.28% | |
| 2017 | Kraig Sadownikow (inc) | 2,284 | 96.82% | |
| 2017 | Write-Ins | 75 | 3.18% | |
| 2020 | Rich Kasten | 3,993 | 47.77% | District 5 Alderman (2014 - 2020). Endorsed by outgoing mayor Kraig Sadownikow |
| 2020 | Christophe E. Jenkins | 4,295 | 51.38% | District 4 Alderman (2015 - 2020) |
| 2020 | Write-Ins | 71 | 0.85% | |
| 2023 | Joel Ongert | 5,594 | 57.17% | Member of West Bend School Board (2017 - 2020) West Bend Public School Foundation (2019 - 2023) |
| 2023 | Denis Kelling | 4,156 | 42.47% | Member of the Washington County Board since 2016. Endorsed by outgoing mayor Christophe E. Jenkins |
| 2023 | Write-Ins | 35 | 0.36% | |
| 2026 | Joel Ongert | 5,619 | 97.40% | |
| 2026 | Write-Ins | 150 | 2.60% | |

=== 2019 Resignation Situation ===
Former mayor Kraig Sadownikow announced his resignation as mayor on October 21, 2019, following a closed session. The reasoning for his resignation was because of an upcoming development where he had a current business relationship with the people involved for over 15 years, and Sadownikow was concerned he would have a bias regarding it. This situation had been addressed to Sadowinkow and a part of the community shared his concern with bias. Sadownikow said "I’ve got to separate my business life from my service life and the best way to maintain my own integrity and the integrity of the office and the project is for me to resign". Sadownikow's resignation was immediate. The City Council held a special meeting to decide what will happen. The council decided to have an interim mayor finish off the rest of Sadownikow's mayoral term. District 6 Alderman Steve Hoogester was appointed as interim mayor on November 4, 2019. Hoogester returned to his role as District 6 Alderman after he completed Sadownikow's term.

=== 2007 Resignation Situation ===
Former Mayor Doug Bade resigned from his office in late May in order to pursue an out-of-state job. The common council was tasked with appointing an interim mayor to serve the last 10 months of Bade's term. On June 5, the council decided to appoint their council president Kristine Deiss. This proved to be a controversial decision as the vote to appoint her was blocked when Aldermen Allen Carter, Terry Vrana, and Scott Frederick walked out. Eventually, on June 10 the vote was held successfully. Kristine Deiss was able to win reelection after she finished off Bade's term.

== Education ==
The city is served by the West Bend School District. The public schools in the district include six elementary schools, two middle schools, and two high schools that share the same building.

A public charter school, Pathways, was created in the 2014–2015 school year, serving grades 7–10. The school began serving grades 7–12 during the 2016–2017 school year. Pathways Charter School closed permanently on June 30, 2019.

The two high schools, West Bend East and West Bend West, are housed in a single building. The schools share facilities, but are operated as independent schools. Each school has its own sports teams and mascot.

The two middle schools are Silverbrook Intermediate School and Badger middle school. Each school serves grades 5-6 and 7-8 respectively.

Rolf's Educational Center provides Head Start, Title I, and Early childhood education programs. The district also operates an alternative school, the West Bend Online Learning Academy. Post-secondary schools in West Bend include Moraine Park Technical College.

There are also a number of Pre-K and K–8 private schools in West Bend. Lutheran schools include Good Shepherd Lutheran School, of the Wisconsin Evangelical Lutheran Synod, Trinity Lutheran School, of the Evangelical Lutheran Synod, and St. John's Lutheran School, of the Lutheran Church–Missouri Synod.

Roman Catholic schools (under the Archdiocese of Milwaukee) include St. Frances Cabrini School and Holy Angels School.

== Media ==
West Bend has a country music station, WMBZ (92.5 FM) and a classic rock station, WRYU (1470 AM). The official newspaper of the City of West Bend is the West Bend Daily News.

The West Bend Booster is an independent, family-owned newspaper covering the area and has an office in West Bend. In 2020, due to COVID-19, The Booster's parent company, Booster Publications, announced that they would permanently close.

The city of West Bend and the West Bend School District maintain their own separate public, educational, and government access channels, carried by both Spectrum and AT&T U-verse throughout the region and also online.

== Transportation ==
The West Bend Municipal Airport is a city-owned, public-use airport located three nautical miles (6 km) east of the central business district of West Bend.

The options for public transportation within West Bend include the city and county taxi programs. The Washington County Commuter Express previously provided bus service to and from the city of Milwaukee until 2023 when the county ended the service.

The city of West Bend is served by US 45 as a freeway bypass west of Downtown, Wis 33, and Wis 144.

The Wisconsin and Southern (WSOR) line from Milwaukee serves an industrial park on the south side of West Bend, ending just south of Rusco Road. The rail line north of this point was abandoned between West Bend and Campbellsport, and became the Eisenbahn State Trail. When the rail line was continuous through West Bend, it was operated by Wisconsin Central, Ltd (WC) most recently.

== Notable people ==
- William Arnemann, Wisconsin state representative
- Samuel S. Barney, judge
- Zack Baun, football player
- Mathias J. Berres, farmer and Wisconsin state representative
- Bill B. Bruhy, Wisconsin state representative
- Ward Christensen, computer scientist
- James Davison, Wisconsin state representative
- John DeMerit, baseball player
- Almah Jane Frisby, physician and professor
- Leander F. Frisby, lawyer
- Bob Gannon, Wisconsin State representative
- Jeremy Hambly, Internet Personality
- Kenneth William Haebig, Wisconsin state representative
- Fred H. Hildebrandt, U.S. representative
- Theodore Holtebeck, Wisconsin state representative
- George F. Hunt, Wisconsin state senator and physician
- Ken Jungels, baseball player
- Florian Lampert, U.S. representative
- Scott May, baseball player
- Stephen F. Mayer, Wisconsin state senator
- Willie Mueller, baseball player
- Andrew P. O'Meara, United States Army officer
- B. S. Potter, Wisconsin state representative
- Ryan Rohlinger, baseball player
- John W. Salter, Wisconsin state representative
- Frederick C. Schroeder, Wisconsin state representative
- Richard H. E. Smith II, software engineer and computer consultant
- Dave Steckel, hockey player
- Jordan Stolz, World Champion speed skater
- Patricia Strachota, Wisconsin state representative
- Frank Weddig, Colorado State Legislator
- Viola S. Wendt, poet
- Morgan White, gymnast

== Sister cities ==
- Aisho, Shiga, Japan
- Heppenheim, Hesse, Germany
- Pazardzhik, Bulgaria

== Sources ==
- Quickert, Carl (1912). Washington County, Wisconsin: Past and Present. Chicago, IL: S. J. Clarke Publishing Company.
