= West Bend Municipal Airport =

Airport in Wisconsin, United States

- IATA: ETB; ICAO: KETB; FAA LID: ETB

Summary
- Airport type: Public
- Owner: City of West Bend
- Serves: West Bend, Wisconsin
- Opened: February 1938
- Time zone: CST (UTC−06:00)
  - Summer (DST): CDT (UTC−05:00)
- Elevation AMSL: 888 ft (271 m)
- Coordinates: 43°25′20″N 088°07′41″W

Map
- Location of airport in Wisconsin ETB (the United States)

Runways
Direction	Length		Surface
Direction	ft	m	Surface
13/31	4,494	1,370	Asphalt
6/24	3,898	1,188	Asphalt

Helipads
Number	Length		Surface
Number	ft	m	Surface
H1	100	30	Asphalt

Statistics
- Aircraft operations (2022): 46,000
- Based aircraft (2024): 88
- Source: Federal Aviation Administration

West Bend Municipal Airport (IATA: ETB, ICAO: KETB, FAA LID: ETB) is a city-owned public-use airport located three nautical miles (6 km) east of the central business district of West Bend, a city in Washington County, Wisconsin, United States. It is included in the Federal Aviation Administration (FAA) National Plan of Integrated Airport Systems for 2025–2029, in which it is categorized as a regional reliever airport facility.

== Facilities and aircraft ==
West Bend Municipal Airport covers an area of 430 acres (174 ha) at an elevation of 888 feet (271 m) above mean sea level. It has two runways and one helipad:

- Runway 13/31: 4,494 x 75 ft. (1,370 x 23 m), surface: asphalt. This runway has a left traffic pattern. It is equipped with a 4-box VASI on the left side of both runways. Both ends have runway end identifier lights, and have runway lights controllable via the CTAF. Runway 31 has a localizer with a frequency of 108.9.
- Runway 6/24: 3,898 x 75 ft. (1,188 x 23 m), surface: asphalt. This runway has a left traffic pattern. It does not have any visual slope indicators, nor does it have runway end identifier lights.
- Helipad H1: 100 x 100 ft. (30 x 30 m), surface: asphalt. This helipad has left traffic. There are blue perimeter lights.

For the 12-month period ending August 10, 2022, the airport had 46,000 aircraft operations, an average of 126 per day: 65% general aviation, 22% military and 13% air taxi. In August 2024, there were 88 aircraft based at this airport: 68 single-engine, 5 multi-engine, 1 jet, 5 helicopter and 9 military.

West Bend Air operates the FBO (fixed-base operator) and provides 100 octane low lead fuel as well as Jet-A fuel. Rental aircraft, a pilot's lounge, a weather office and a gift shop are also located on field and operated by West Bend Air.

== See also ==
- List of airports in Wisconsin
