= Kewaskum (town), Wisconsin =

Town in Washington County, Wisconsin

Kewaskum, Wisconsin
- Town
- Town of Kewaskum
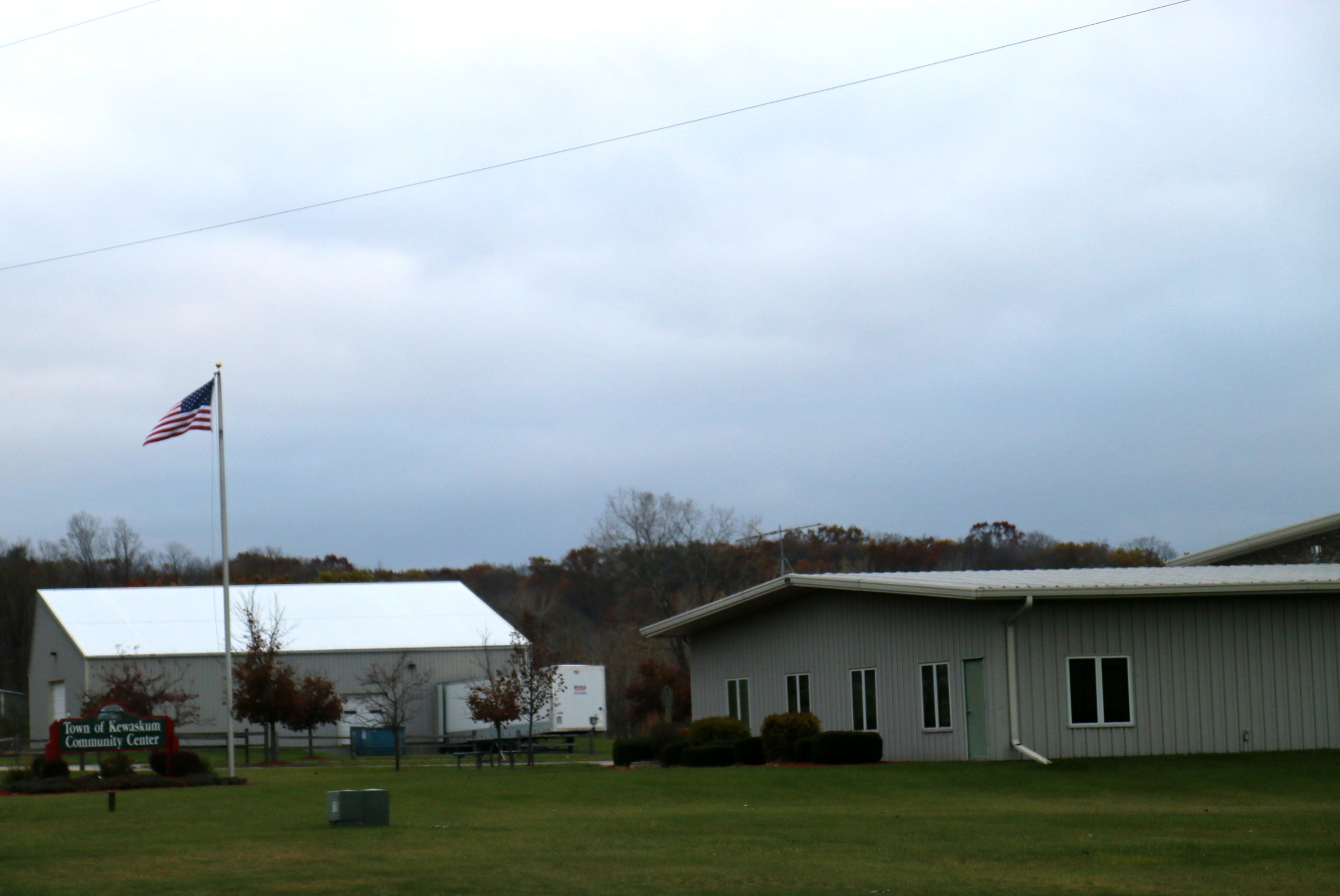
- The community center for the Town of Kewaskum.

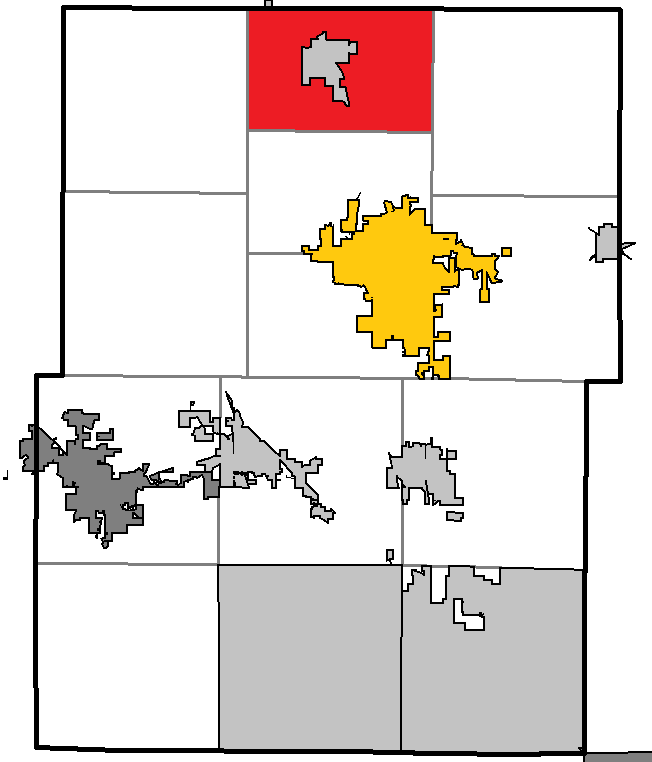
- Location of Kewaskum, within Washington County
- Coordinates: 43°31′15″N 88°13′44″W
- Country: United States
- State: Wisconsin
- County: Washington

Area
  - Total: 21.94 sq mi (56.8 km^{2})
  - Land: 21.93 sq mi (56.8 km^{2})
  - Water: 0.01 sq mi (0.026 km^{2})

Population (2020)
  - Total: 1,118
  - Density: 50.98/sq mi (19.68/km^{2})
- Time zone: UTC-6 (Central (CST))
  - Summer (DST): UTC-5 (CDT)
- Area code: 262
- GNIS feature ID: 1583474

Kewaskum is a town in Washington County, Wisconsin, United States. The population was 1,118 at the 2020 census. The incorporated community of Village of Kewaskum is surrounded geographically by the Town of Kewaskum. The unincorporated community of Saint Michaels is located partially in the town.

== Toponymy ==
Kewaskum was the leader of a group of Potawatomi Native Americans who lived in Washington County in the 1840s. He was friendly with the early settlers, including future Wisconsin state senator Densmore Maxon. He died sometime between 1847 and 1850. In 1849, the early settlers named the Town of Kewaskum (and later the village) in his honor. In the Potawatomi language, Kewaskum means "turning back on his tracks" or "retracing his steps."

== History ==
In the early 19th century, the Kewaskum area was home to Potawatomi Native Americans, who surrendered the land the United States Federal Government in 1833 through the 1833 Treaty of Chicago, which (after being ratified in 1835) required them to leave Wisconsin by 1838. While many Potawatomis moved west of the Mississippi River to Kansas, some chose to remain, and were referred to as "strolling Potawatomi" in contemporary documents because many of them were migrants who subsisted by squatting on their ancestral lands, which were now owned by white settlers. One band of Potawatomis travelled through Dodge, Jefferson, and Washington counties, and was led by Chief Kewaskum, who had a camp on Pike Lake. The chief was friendly with the white settlers who began arriving in the 1840s. He died sometime between 1847 and 1850, but itinerant Native people lived in Washington County into the late 19th century, when many of them gathered in northern Wisconsin to form the Forest County Potawatomi Community.

The first settlers in the area were the Barnes family, who arrived in 1844. In 1847, the Wisconsin Territorial Legislature created the Town of North Bend from land that had previously been part of the Town of West Bend, and the community's first post office was established. In 1849, the residents changed their community's name to the Town of Kewaskum to distinguish it from neighboring West Bend.

While the first settlers were primarily farmers, the businesses soon followed to serve to early settlers. In 1852, J. H. Myer settled on a horseshoe bend in the Milwaukee River and built a sawmill and a gristmill. The settlement, which was originally known as "Myer's Mill" before it became the Village of Kewaskum, soon became a market town with a general store and a blacksmith shop serving the local farmers. The first religious services were held in private homes, and in 1862 the Catholic settlers constructed a church. A German Methodist church was built in 1866 and a Lutheran church was built in 1868. In 1873, the Chicago and North Western Railway completed a line from Milwaukee to Fond du Lac with a station in the future Village of Kewaskum. The community's rail connections caused the local economy to grow and prosper as new businesses, including hotels, stores, and grain elevators opened around the station. The Village of Kewaskum incorporated in 1895.

The village's population boomed during the post–World War II economic expansion, doubling between 1950 and 1990, leading the village to annex land from the Town of Kewaskum for new commercial and residential developments. The village first annexed land in 1959, and again in many subsequent years, most recently in 2005.

== Geography ==
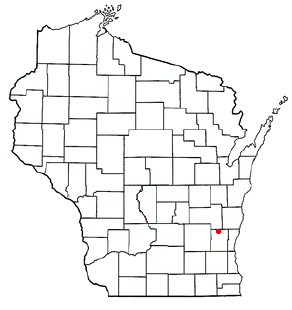
Location of Kewaskum (town), Wisconsin

According to the United States Census Bureau, the town has a total area of 22.8 square miles (59.0 km^{2}), of which 22.8 square miles (59.0 km^{2}) is land and 0.04 square mile (0.1 km^{2}) (0.09%) is water.

== Demographics ==
As of the census of 2000, there were 1,119 people, 394 households, and 327 families residing in the town. The population density was 49.2 people per square mile (19.0/km^{2}). There were 404 housing units at an average density of 17.7 per square mile (6.9/km^{2}). The racial makeup of the town was 99.55% White, 0.27% Native American, 0.18% from other races. 0.18% of the population were Hispanic or Latino of any race.

There were 394 households, out of which 36.0% had children under the age of 18 living with them, 76.1% were married couples living together, 4.1% had a female householder with no husband present, and 17.0% were non-families. 14.7% of all households were made up of individuals, and 4.6% had someone living alone who was 65 years of age or older. The average household size was 2.84 and the average family size was 3.14.

In the town, the population was spread out, with 25.0% under the age of 18, 7.6% from 18 to 24, 29.1% from 25 to 44, 26.2% from 45 to 64, and 12.1% who were 65 years of age or older. The median age was 39 years. For every 100 females, there were 104.2 males. For every 100 females age 18 and over, there were 104.1 males.

The median income for a household in the town was $59,500, and the median income for a family was $65,060. Males had a median income of $39,833 versus $26,121 for females. The per capita income for the town was $22,802. About 3.5% of families and 4.4% of the population were below the poverty line, including 6.3% of those under age 18 and 4.8% of those age 65 or over.
