= Hiram Giles =

American politician (1820–1895)

Hiram H. Giles

President pro tempore of the Wisconsin Senate
- In office January 13, 1858 – January 12, 1859
- Preceded by: Vacant (1857); Louis P. Harvey (1856)
- Succeeded by: Denison Worthington

Member of the Wisconsin Senate from the 11th district
- In office January 10, 1855 – January 12, 1859
- Preceded by: Thomas T. Whittlesey
- Succeeded by: William Robert Taylor

Member of the Wisconsin State Assembly from the Dane 3rd district
- In office January 14, 1852 – January 12, 1853
- Preceded by: Gabriel Bjornson
- Succeeded by: Storer W. Field

Personal details
- Born: Hiram Horatio Giles; March 22, 1820 New Salem, Massachusetts
- Died: May 10, 1895 (aged 75) Madison, Wisconsin
- Resting place: Forest Hill Cemetery; Madison, Wisconsin
- Party: Republican; Whig (before 1855)
- Spouses: Rebecca S. (Watson) Giles; (died 1884)
- Children: Belle (Dow)^{(b. 1847; died 1924)}; Ella Augusta (Ruddy)^{(b. 1856; died 1917)}

Hiram Horatio Giles (March 22, 1820 – May 10, 1895) was an American farmer, businessman, and politician. He served as president of the National Conference of Charities and Correction.

== Biography ==
Giles was born in New Salem, Massachusetts. He moved to Erie County, Pennsylvania, and lived on a farm for two years from 1842 to 1844. He moved to the Wisconsin Territory in 1847 and settled on a farm in the town of Dunkirk, Dane County, Wisconsin. In 1852, Giles served in the Wisconsin State Assembly and in the Wisconsin Senate from 1855 to 1858. Giles was a Whig and then a Republican. From 1871 to 1881, he worked for the Milwaukee & Prairie du Chien Railroad as a claims and right of way agent. From 1871 to 1891, Giles served on the Wisconsin Board of Charities and Reform. Hiram Giles died in Madison, Wisconsin.
