= Harvey G. Turner =

19th century American politician

Judge of Ozaukee County, Wisconsin
- In office April 1853 – December 31, 1857
- Preceded by: Position established
- Succeeded by: J. C. Downs

Member of the Wisconsin Senate from the 11th district
- In office January 6, 1851 – January 3, 1853
- Preceded by: Frederick W. Horn
- Succeeded by: Thomas T. Whittlesey

Personal details
- Born: June 7, 1822 East Oswego, New York, U.S.
- Died: November 22, 1893 (aged 71) Milwaukee, Wisconsin, U.S.
- Cause of death: Influenza
- Resting place: Forest Home Cemetery, Milwaukee
- Party: Democratic
- Spouse: Emeline Griswold Teall (m. 1846; died 1886)
- Children: William J. Turner; (b. 1848; died 1919)
- Parent: Joseph Turner (father)
- Relatives: Eugene S. Turner (brother); Griswold family

Harvey Griswold Turner (June 7, 1822 – November 22, 1893) was an American lawyer, Democratic politician, and Wisconsin pioneer. He served two years in the Wisconsin Senate, representing Washington and Ozaukee counties during the 1851 and 1852 terms; he then served as the first county judge of Ozaukee County, from 1853 through 1857. Before Wisconsin achieved statehood, he was the youngest delegate to serve in Wisconsin's 2nd constitutional convention, which produced the Constitution of Wisconsin in the Winter of 1847–1848.

His father, Joseph Turner, and brother, Eugene S. Turner, were also early members of the Wisconsin Legislature.

== Biography ==
Born in East Oswego, New York, Turner received his primary education at Oswego Academy. He moved to Waukesha, Wisconsin Territory, in 1840, with his parents and siblings, where they were some of the first settlers in the area. Beginning in 1842, he read law at the law offices of Finch & Lynde in Milwaukee. He was admitted to the bar in 1844 and quickly moved to set up a legal practice in Grafton, in Washington County.

In 1847, Turner was elected as a delegate to Wisconsin's 2nd constitutional convention. He was the youngest delegate at the convention, and was assigned to the committee on executive, legislative, and administrative provisions. Following the referendum which ratified the constitution, Turner was considered a candidate for Wisconsin circuit court judge in the 3rd circuit, but he withdrew after the nomination of Charles H. Larrabee.

In 1850, he was elected as Washington County's representative to the Wisconsin State Senate, running on the Democratic ticket. In 1853, Ozaukee County was created from the eastern quarter of Washington County and Turner was elected as the first county judge of the new county. He was subsequently re-elected and served until 1858.

In 1854, the Ozaukee County Democratic Party rejected the renomination of John B. Macy for Congress in Wisconsin's 3rd congressional district, and instead nominated Turner. Turner consented to the nomination, but came in a distant 3rd in the November general election.

He subsequently moved to Manitowoc, where he formed a law practice in partnership with his son, William. The partnership ended in 1882, when William moved to Milwaukee. But the elder Turner also subsequently moved to Milwaukee—after the death of his wife—and the two resumed their partnership in 1887. Harvey Turner retired from the practice just a few months before his death in 1893.

His death was attributed to influenza.

== Family ==
Harvey Turner was a son of Joseph Turner and his wife Mary (née Griswold). The Turners and Griswolds were both descendants of early and prominent settlers of Connecticut Colony. The passage of Connecticut's first Blue laws were attributed to an ancestor of the Turner family. The Griswolds were related to Connecticut governors Matthew and Roger Griswold.

Joseph Turner served in the War of 1812, then brought his family to the new Wisconsin Territory in 1840. He served in the Territorial Legislature and subsequently served in the Wisconsin State Senate during the 1st State Legislature. Later he became one of the founders of Menasha, Wisconsin. Harvey's younger brother, Eugene S. Turner, also served in the Wisconsin Legislature and was a prominent lawyer in Port Washington, Wisconsin.

Harvey Turner married Emeline Griswold Teall, a cousin of his mother. They had one son, William J. Turner, who also became a prominent lawyer and served as a Wisconsin circuit court judge in Milwaukee County.

== Electoral history ==
=== U.S. House of Representatives (1854) ===
Wisconsin's 3rd Congressional District Election, 1854
Party	Candidate	Votes	%	±%
General Election, November 7, 1854
Republican	Charles Billinghurst	13,359	55.94%	
Democratic	John B. Macy (incumbent)	8,596	36.83%	−19.42%
Independent Democrat	Harvey G. Turner	1,924	8.06%	
Plurality		4,763	19.95%	+0.84%
Total votes		23,879	100.0%	-9.34%
Republican gain from Democratic		Swing	39.05%	

Wisconsin Senate
Preceded by Frederick W. Horn	Member of the Wisconsin Senate from the 11th district January 6, 1851 – January 3, 1853	Succeeded by Thomas T. Whittlesey
Legal offices
New county government	Judge of Ozaukee County, Wisconsin; April 1853 – December 31, 1857	Succeeded by J. C. Downs
