= James Fagan (farmer-politician) =

19th century American politician

Member of the Wisconsin State Assembly
- In office January 5, 1857 – January 4, 1858
- Preceded by: District established
- Succeeded by: Charles W. Detmering
- Constituency: Washington 3rd district
- In office January 1, 1849 – January 7, 1850
- Preceded by: Benjamin H. Mooers
- Succeeded by: Eugene S. Turner
- Constituency: Washington 2nd district

Personal details
- Born: July 4, 1806 County Westmeath, Ireland, UK
- Died: February 11, 1868 (aged 61) Jackson, Washington County, Wisconsin, U.S.
- Cause of death: Cancer
- Resting place: Saint Francis Borgia Catholic Cemetery, Cedarburg, Wisconsin
- Party: Democratic
- Spouse: Anna Monaghan (m. 1842)
- Children: 5
- Occupation: Farmer

James Fagan (July 4, 1806 – February 11, 1868) was an Irish American immigrant, farmer, and Wisconsin pioneer. He was a member of the Wisconsin State Assembly, representing Washington County during the 1849 and 1857 sessions. He earlier served as a delegate to Wisconsin's second constitutional convention, which produced the Constitution of Wisconsin.

== Background ==
Fagan was born July 4, 1806, in County Westmeath in Ireland, and became a farmer. In 1837 he emigrated to the United States, settling in Orange County, New York, and was soon followed by his younger brother Thomas. James worked as a night watchman, and married Anna Monahan in 1842. They had their first of five sons before moving to Wisconsin Territory in 1844. He bought 280 acres of land in Section 26 of Jackson. His brother Thomas soon followed, and settled nearby.

== Public office ==
Fagan was elected to represent Jackson as a county supervisor for 1847-49. When the second Wisconsin constitutional convention was held in 1847, he was a delegate from Washington County. He was assigned to the committee on education and school funds. In 1848 he was elected from the Assembly's 2nd Washington County district (the Towns of Jackson and Grafton), succeeding fellow Democrat Benjamin H. Mooers, for the 1849 session (the 2nd Wisconsin Legislature). When Fagan joined the Assembly in January 1849, he was reported to be 36 years old, from Ireland, and to have been in Wisconsin for four years. He was succeeded for the 1850 session by another Democrat, Eugene S. Turner.

He was elected to the Assembly again for the 1857 session from the newly created 3rd Washington County district (Towns of Farmington, Germantown, Jackson and Trenton), although his mailing address was recorded as Cedarburg. He was succeeded in 1858 by another Democrat, Charles W. Detmering.

For the 1866-67 term of what was now the county Board of Commissioners, he was elected to represent the 3rd Assembly district, and chosen chairman of the county board.

== Death ==
Fagan and Anna had had five sons. They were devout Catholics; one of their sons became a priest. James Fagan died February 11, 1868, of facial cancer.

Wisconsin State Assembly
Preceded by Benjamin H. Mooers	Member of the Wisconsin State Assembly from the Washington 2nd district January 1, 1849 – January 7, 1850	Succeeded by Eugene S. Turner
District created by 1856 Wisc. Act 109	Member of the Wisconsin State Assembly from the Washington 3rd district January 5, 1857 – January 4, 1858	Succeeded by Charles W. Detmering
