= Joseph Turner (Wisconsin politician) =

Member of the Wisconsin Senate (died 1874)

Member of the Wisconsin Senate from the 13th district
- In office June 5, 1848 – January 1, 1849
- Preceded by: Position established
- Succeeded by: Frederick Sprague

Member of the Council of the Wisconsin Territory from Waukesha County
- In office January 4, 1847 – May 29, 1848
- Preceded by: Position established
- Succeeded by: Position abolished

Personal details
- Born: 1793 or 1794 Vermont, U.S.
- Died: February 1, 1874 (age 80) Menasha, Wisconsin, U.S.
- Party: Democratic
- Spouse: Mary Griswold (m. 1816–1874)
- Children: Harvey G. Turner^{(b. 1822; died 1893)}; Eugene S. Turner^{(b. 1824; died 1915)}; Amanda Anna Louisa (Reed)^{(died 1862)}; at least 2 others

Military service
- Allegiance: United States
- Battles/wars: War of 1812

Joseph Turner (1793/1794 – February 1, 1874) was an American farmer, Democratic politician, and Wisconsin pioneer. He represented Waukesha County in the Wisconsin State Senate during the 1st Wisconsin Legislature (1848). Two of his sons were also Wisconsin legislators.

== Background ==
Turner, born in Vermont, was an American soldier in the War of 1812. He married Mary Griswold, of the Griswold family which gave Connecticut two governors, Matthew and Roger (Turner's family also hailed from Connecticut) at Sangerfield, New York, in 1816. On May 11, 1840, the Turners, with one daughter and four sons, landed in Milwaukee. Within the next three weeks, they had settled upon 320 acres of raw land, three miles west of Prairieville (now Waukesha), Wisconsin Territory where they built a log cabin and lived for two years, until a frame house could be built. Theirs was one of the three settlers' houses on the trail between their cabin and Aztalan on the Rock River, some thirty miles away.

== Public office ==
Turner was a member of the first Waukesha County Board of Supervisors after that county was split off from Milwaukee County, and was elected county clerk by that body after the incumbent was removed from office. He represented his county on the "Legislative Council" (equivalent to a state senate) in all three sessions of the fifth and final Wisconsin Territory Legislative Assembly in 1847-48. His son Harvey G. Turner was a delegate to the second Wisconsin Constitutional Convention in 1847–48; and when statehood was achieved, Joseph Turner was the first Senator from the 13th District (Waukesha County) in 1848. He was succeeded the next year by fellow Democrat Frederick Sprague. In 1850, his son Eugene S. Turner was elected to the Wisconsin State Assembly from Washington County; and in 1851 Harvey was elected to the Senate from Ozaukee County. Their daughter Amanda Anna Louisa Turner married Harrison Reed, then editor of the Milwaukee Sentinel, who would (after her 1862 death) later become Governor of Florida.

In 1855, Joseph and Mary Turner moved to Winnebago County, Wisconsin, along with Amanda and her husband, where they were among the founders of the city of Menasha. Joseph served as a member of the Winnebago County Board of Supervisors of Winnebago County for many years and was a Superintendent of the Poor for some years. He died at his home in Menasha on February 1, 1874; Mary survived him, and died in Berlin, Wisconsin on August 1, 1884.

== Relation to Peter H. Turner ==
There are unsourced claims on some websites that Joseph was the brother of Peter H. Turner, who also came to Wisconsin in 1840.
