= Almerin M. Carter =

19th century American politician

Member of the Wisconsin State Assembly from the Rock 3rd district
- In office January 6, 1868 – January 4, 1869
- Preceded by: William H. Stark
- Succeeded by: Adelmorn Sherman

Personal details
- Born: October 4, 1814 Warren, Connecticut, U.S.
- Died: June 7, 1898 (aged 83) Madison, Wisconsin, U.S.
- Resting place: Johnstown, Rock County, Wisconsin
- Party: Republican; Whig (before 1854)
- Spouses: Dolly A. Wadham (m. 1836; died 1847); Sarah Wedge (m. 1848; died 1892)
- Children: with Dolly Wadham; Ellen Elisa (Carter)^{(b. 1837; died 1899)}; Emma Josephine Carter^{(b. 1840; died 1858)}; Charles Adoniram Carter^{(b. 1845; died 1919)}; Sarah Wedge; Frances Wedge (Light)^{(b. 1853; died 1933)}
- Occupation: Farmer

Almerin Marshall Carter (October 4, 1814 – June 7, 1898) was an American farmer, Republican politician, and Wisconsin pioneer. He was a member of the Wisconsin State Assembly, representing eastern Rock County in the 1868 session. Earlier, he represented Rock County as a delegate to Wisconsin's 2nd constitutional convention, which produced the Constitution of Wisconsin. His name was often abbreviated as A. M. Carter.

== Biography ==
Almerin M. Carter was born October 4, 1814, at Litchfield County, Connecticut. Shortly after his birth, his family relocated to Oneida County, New York, where Carter was raised and educated. He received an academic education at Hamilton, New York, and decided to become a farmer.

He moved to the Wisconsin Territory in 1842, settling on a farm in what is now Johnstown, Rock County, Wisconsin, where he resided for the rest of his life. He became active in politics with the Whig Party and served as one of the first county commissioners of Rock County, Wisconsin.

After voters rejected the first attempt at a constitution for Wisconsin, Carter was elected to serve in Wisconsin's second constitutional convention. At the convention, he served on the committee on general business of the convention. The constitution produced by the second convention was ratified by voters in 1848, and Wisconsin was admitted to the Union as the 30th state.

Carter joined the Republican Party when it was organized in 1854. He was elected to the Wisconsin State Assembly in the 1867 election, running on the Republican Party ticket. He represented Rock County's third Assembly district, which then comprised much of the eastern half of the county. In the 1868 legislative session, he served on the Assembly committee on agriculture. He was not a candidate for re-election in 1868.

In his later years, he was a director of the Johnstown Fire Insurance Company, a member of the Independent Order of Odd Fellows, and a prominent Granger.

In June 1898, Carter went to Madison, Wisconsin, for the fiftieth anniversary of Wisconsin's statehood and a reunion of the surviving delegates to the constitutional convention. While in Madison, he suffered a stroke on the night of June 6 and died early the next day.

== Personal life and family ==
Almerin M. Carter was the eldest son among nine children born to Guy and Sarepta (née Marshall) Carter. Guy Carter was also a lifelong farmer and served as an early trustee of Colgate University. The Carters were descended from English colonists who settled in Litchfield County, Connecticut Colony, in the 1660s.

Almerin Carter married twice. His first wife was Dolly Wadham of Goshen, Connecticut. They married in September 1836 and had three children together before her death in 1847. The next year, he married Sarah Wedge of Warren, Connecticut. They had one more daughter, and were married for 44 years before her death in 1892.

Wisconsin State Assembly
| Preceded by William H. Stark | Member of the Wisconsin State Assembly from the Rock 3rd district January 6, 1868 – January 4, 1869 | Succeeded by Adelmorn Sherman |
