= Ella Giles Ruddy =

American author, editor and essayist (1851–1917)

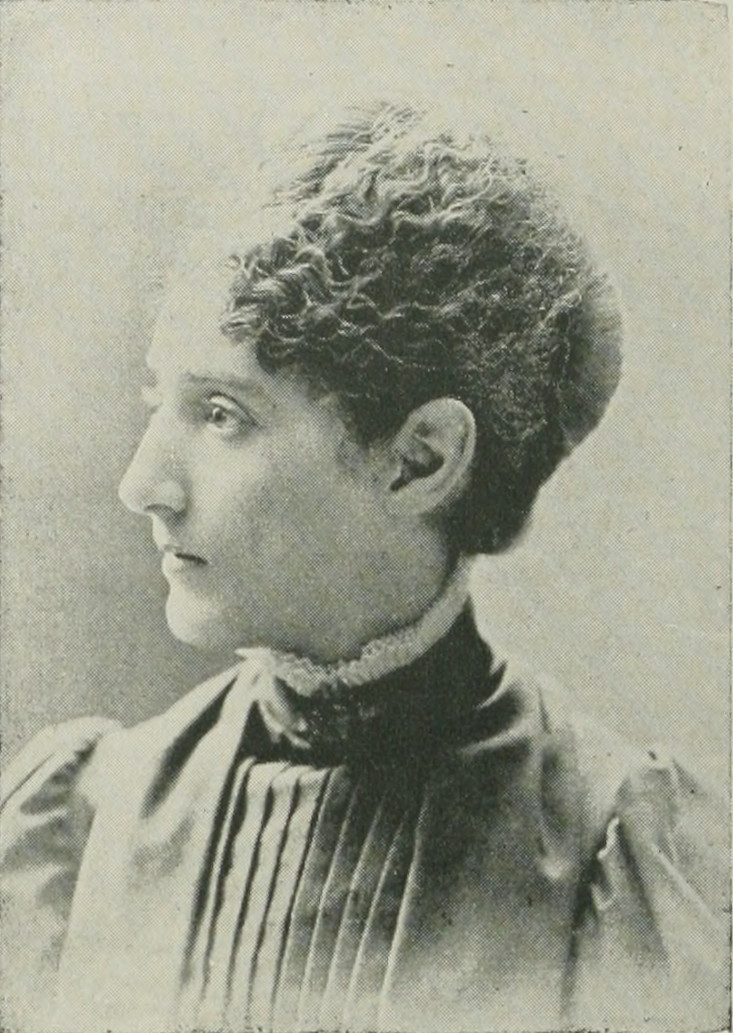
- Photo in A Woman of the Century
- Born: Ella Augusta Giles; February 2, 1851; Dunkirk, Wisconsin, U.S.
- Died: June 26, 1917 (aged 66); Los Angeles, California, U.S.
- Resting place: Forest Hill Cemetery, Madison, Wisconsin, U.S.
- Education: Stoughton High School, University of Wisconsin
- Occupations: Author, editor, essayist
- Writing career
- Language: English
- Notable works: Bachelor Ben, Out From the Shadows, Maiden Rachel, Flowers of the Spirit

Ella Giles Ruddy (née, Giles; February 2, 1851 – June 26, 1917) was an American author and editor. She published a large number of essays on social science topics. Ruddy was the author of Bachelor Ben, Out From the Shadows, Maiden Rachel, and Flowers of the Spirit (verse). She also wrote stories for Harper’s Bazaar, literary sketches for Chicago Times (on staff three years), The Century, New York Evening Post, and others. She was the editor of Mother of Clubs. Her literary friends included Lilian Whiting and Zona Gale.

== Early life and education ==
Ella Augusta Giles was born in Dunkirk, Wisconsin, February 2, 1851. She was the daughter of Hiram Horatio Giles, for twenty years a member of the Wisconsin State Board of Charities. He was once president of the National Conference of Charities. From him, Giles inherited a philanthropic spirit, which was visible in her writings. Her mother's maiden name was Rebecca S. Watson. From the maternal side, Giles inherited a love of art and literature.

Ruddy early showed musical talent. Her fine voice was carefully cultivated by Hans Balatka. She received her education at Stoughton High School and the University of Wisconsin.

== Career ==
She was quite distinguished as an oratorio and church singer when her health failed, and she was compelled to abandon what promised to be a successful career in music. During the isolation illness rendered necessary she wrote her first romance, Bachelor Ben (Chicago, 1875). It had a very wide sale, reaching the third edition in a few months and making its young author exceedingly popular throughout the Northwest. Her stories Out From the Shadows (1876) and Maiden Rachel (1879) followed with the same publishers. Meanwhile, Ruddy received many calls for lectures and achieved success in that field. In 1879, she became librarian of the public library in Madison, Wisconsin, and held the position for five years, doing at the same time much literary work. She resigned after her mother's death, in 1884. so as to devote herself to the care of her father's home.

Her first verses then began to appear and won an immediate favor. She published one volume of poems entitled Flowers of the Spirit (Chicago, 1891). Her winters were always passed in the South, and she wrote many newspaper letters from the Gulf Coast of Mississippi and various parts of the South. She made a study of Scandinavian literature and was known for her scholarly sketches of Swedish and Norwegian writers. These sketches were translated into Swedish and Norwegian by different authors. She wrote many valuable articles on prison reform and ethical subjects, and belonged to the Woman's Congress committee on journalism.

Ruddy's letters, poems and sketches appeared in The Nation, the Evening Post, the Home Journal, the Magazine of Poetry, and many other papers. She was a prolific contributor to the literary departments of news journals, chiefly Chicago Times, The Milwaukee Sentinel, and The Milwaukee Evening Wisconsin. Some of her leading articles to The Chicago Times were: "Rasmus B. Anderson", "The literary culture of criminals", "Kristofer Jansen", "Columbus and Ericson portraits", "Hjalmar Hjorth Boyesen", "Victor Rydberg", "Literary Norsemen", "The Norwegian Fourth", "An authors' association (Indiana Poets, etc.)", "The woman's congress", "Feeble-minded children", "Scenes in the south (An Alabama poor-house)", "Convict camps in the south", "The new South, and Grady's speech", "An abode of the damned (A visit to the Florida insane asylum)", "The South as it is; Women in the chain gangs", "Henrick Ibsen", "A southern poet (Robert Burns Wilson)", "An Alabama songwriter (Samuel Minturn Peck)", "Among the southern poor", "Among the Shakers", "Down in Alabama", "For minds diseased (Non-restraint system in Alabama)". Her leading Sentinel articles were: "Wisconsin poetry", "Public library facetiae", "Women in charities (address before Illinois social science association)", "Miss Vim in the south", "In old Kentucky", "To the devil's swamp (Pass Christian, Mips.)", "Hattie Tyng Griswold", "In The Wisconsin"; she wrote on Charlotte Cushman, Antoinette Blackwell, Clara Louise Kellogg, Anna Dickinson, and a leper island. "A psychological problem", "Jealous of a crochet needle", "Her puritan prudery", and "Only a day", appeared in The Wisconsin, as did "A library romance". She also wrote articles of travel, romances, and sketches, in The Chicago Ledger, The Chicago Inter Ocean, Milwaukee Sunday Telegraph, Wisconsin State Journal (Madison), Chicago Weekly Magazine (notably, "The future of our emigrant girls", "Emerson's gospel", and "The obligations of woman"); New York Home Journal; New Orleans Picayune; Woman's Journal (Boston); Minnesota Tribune; and The Christian Register (Boston). Giles also contributed thirty biographical sketches of Wisconsin women, in A Woman of the Century, Buffalo, N. Y., 1892.

She served on the staff of the Chicago Times for three years, still keeping her home on Lake Monona in Madison. She was the first woman to read a paper before the Wisconsin Academy of Science, Arts and Letters. In the mid-1870s, she served as editor of the Milwaukee Magazine, which was renamed as the Midland.

Ruddy's father was president of the National Conference of Charities and Correction, and she herself was a delegate to such conferences, appointed by the governors in Wisconsin.

== Personal life ==
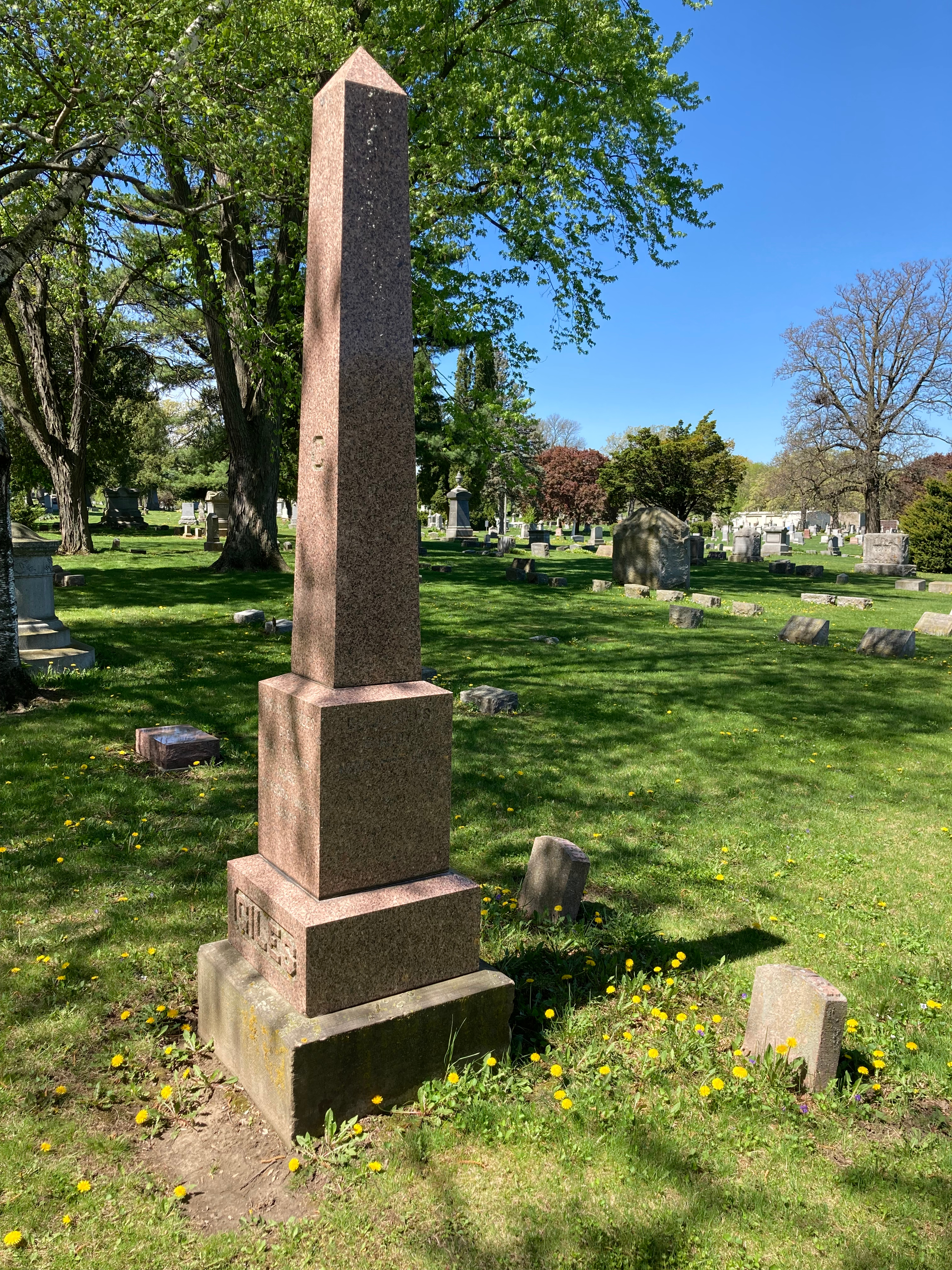
Ruddy's grave at Forest Hill Cemetery

As Ella A. Giles, she read papers before the Prison Congress and the Illinois Social Science Association. Being deeply interested in liberal religious thought, she attended a course of lectures in the Meadville Theological School. Ruddy was a Unitarian; and later became a Christian Scientist.

In Los Angeles, in 1896, she married George Drake Ruddy. She was a founder of philanthropic clubs in Los Angeles. She favored woman suffrage; and was the first president of the Los Angeles Political Equality League, as well as the president of the Los Angeles Equal Suffrage Association, and the Southern California Woman's Press Club. In 1902, Ruddy became the first president of the California Badger Club, Los Angeles District. She was a member of the Friday Morning Club, the Ebeil Club (Los Angeles), Los Angeles Women's City Club, and the Severance Club.

Ruddy died in Los Angeles on June 26, 1917, and is buried at Forest Hill Cemetery, in Madison, Wisconsin.

== Selected works ==
- Bachelor Ben, 1875
- Out from the shadows; or, Trial and triumph, 1876
- Maiden Rachel, 1879
- Little blue shoes. The shoes of blue., 1885
- An international tea-party, or, Anything to get votes : a dramatic dialogue, 1886
- Flowers of the spirit, 1891
- Club etiquette : a conversation between a club woman and a non-member who answer the calling, 1902
- The Mother of Clubs, by Caroline M. Seymour Severance; Ella Giles Ruddy, editor, 1906
- The story of a literary career, by Ella Wheeler Wilcox, with description of Mrs. Wilcox's Home and Life by Ella Giles Ruddy, 1905
- Around the Year with Ella Wheeler Wilcox, compiled by Ella Giles Ruddy, 1904
- Lace o'me life, 1916
