= Thomas T. Whittlesey =

19th century American politician (1798–1868)

Member of the U.S. House of Representatives from Connecticut
- In office April 29, 1836 – March 3, 1839
- Preceded by: Zalmon Wildman (AL); District established (4th)
- Succeeded by: District eliminated (AL); Thomas B. Osborne (4th)
- Constituency: At-large district (1836-37); 4th district (1837-39)

Member of the Wisconsin Senate from the 11th district
- In office January 3, 1853 – January 1, 1855
- Preceded by: Harvey G. Turner
- Succeeded by: Hiram Giles

Personal details
- Born: Thomas Tucker Whittlesey; December 8, 1798 Danbury, Connecticut, U.S.
- Died: August 20, 1868 (aged 69) Pheasant Branch, Wisconsin, U.S.
- Resting place: Forest Hill Cemetery; Madison, Wisconsin, U.S.
- Party: Jacksonian Democrat
- Spouse: Caroline Holley (died 1841)
- Relations: Elisha Whittlesey (cousin); Frederick Whittlesey (cousin)
- Children: Elisha Whittlesey^{(b. 1829; died 1902)}; Luther Holly Whittlesey^{(b. 1833; died 1895)}
- Education: Yale College
- Profession: lawyer

Thomas Tucker Whittlesey (December 8, 1798 – August 20, 1868) was an American lawyer, jurist and politician who served as a U.S. representative from Connecticut from 1836 to 1839.

== Biography ==
Thomas Tucker Whittlesey was born on December 8, 1798, in Danbury, Connecticut, Whittlesey attended the public schools and graduated from Yale College in 1817. He then attended Litchfield Law School, was admitted to the bar in 1818.

== Career ==
Whittlesey started a law practice in Danbury, Connecticut. Whittlesey served as a probate judge.

=== Congress ===
Whittlesey was elected as a Jacksonian to the Twenty-fourth Congress to fill the vacancy caused by the death of Zalmon Wildman. He was reelected as a Democrat to the Twenty-fifth Congress and served from April 29, 1836, to March 3, 1839. He was an unsuccessful candidate for reelection in 1838 to the Twenty-sixth Congress.

=== Later career ===
He moved to Pheasant Branch, near Madison, Wisconsin, in 1846. He resumed practicing law and was also engaged in farming. He served as member of the Wisconsin Senate in 1853 and 1854.

== Personal life ==
Whittlesey married Caroline Holley (1800–1841). He was cousin of Elisha Whittlesey and Frederick Whittlesey.

=== Death and burial ===
Whittlesey died on August 20, 1868, in Pheasant Branch, Wisconsin. He was interred in Forest Hill Cemetery in Madison, Wisconsin.

Wisconsin Senate
Preceded by Harvey G. Turner	Member of the Wisconsin Senate from the 11th district January 3, 1853 – January 1, 1855	Succeeded by Hiram Giles
U.S. House of Representatives
Preceded by Zalmon Wildman	Member of the U.S. House of Representatives from Connecticut's at-large congressional district 1836–1837	Succeeded by District inactive
Preceded by District created	Member of the U.S. House of Representatives from Connecticut's 4th congressional district 1837–1839	Succeeded by Thomas Burr Osborne
