= Niagara (steamboat) =

Side-wheel palace steamer sunk in Lake Michigan

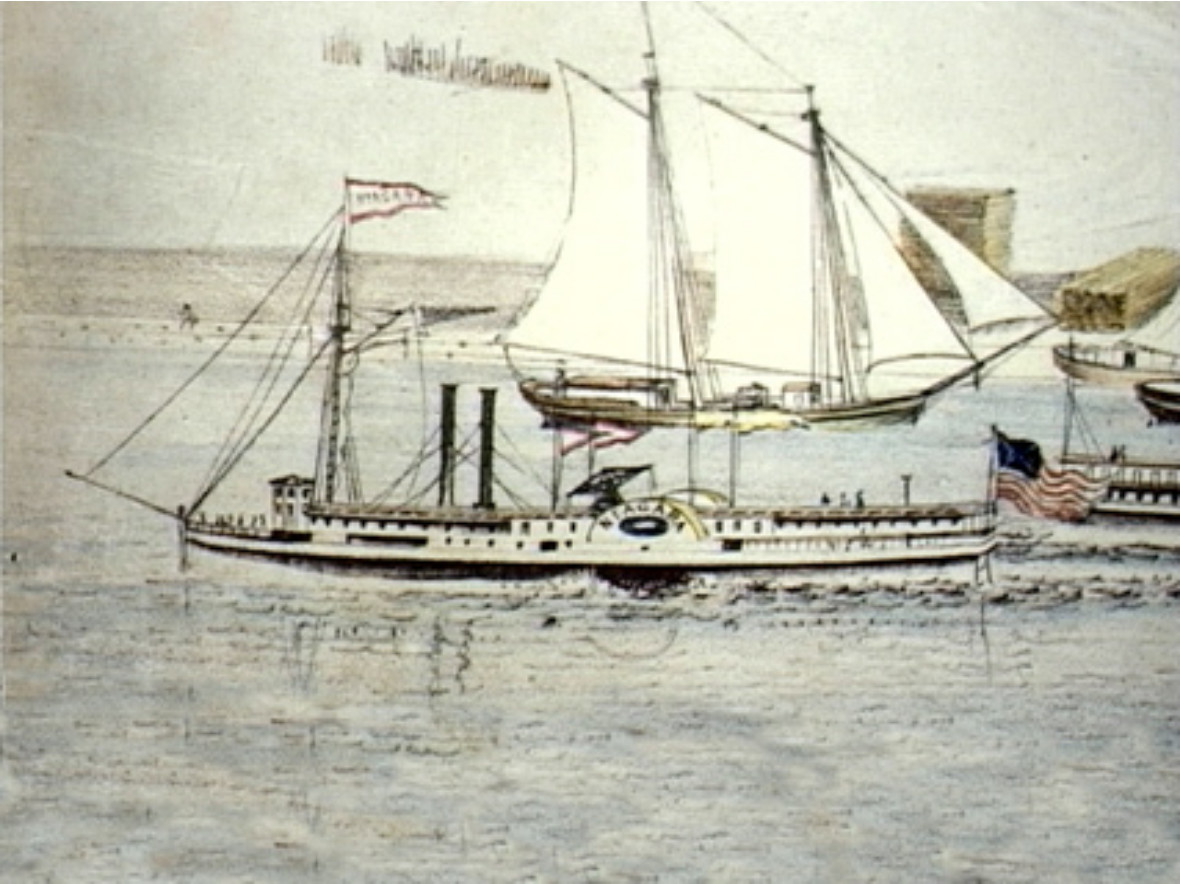

History

United States
- Name: Niagara
- Owner: Charles M. Reed (1845-185?)
- Operator: Reed's Line (1846-185?); Collingwood Line (1855-56)
- Builder: Bidwell & Banta, Buffalo, NY
- Launched: 6 June 1845
- Completed: 1845
- Fate: Caught fire and sank, September 24, 1856

General characteristics
- Class & type: Passenger-cargo steamboat
- Tons burthen: 1099
- Length: 230 ft (70 m)
- Beam: 34 ft (10 m)
- Depth of hold: 14 ft.
- Installed power: 1 × vertical beam
- Propulsion: Sidewheels
- Niagara (steamer)
- U.S. National Register of Historic Places
- Location within Wisconsin Location within the United States
- Location: One mile off Belgium, Wisconsin
- Coordinates: 43°14′18″N 87°50′43″W
- Built: 1845
- MPS: Great Lakes Shipwreck Sites of Wisconsin MPS
- NRHP reference No.: 96001456
- Added to NRHP: December 16, 1996

Niagara was a 245-foot (75 m) long sidewheel palace steamer launched in 1845. It carried passengers and cargo around the North American Great Lakes. It was owned by the Collingwood Line.

On September 23, 1856, the Niagara left Sheboygan, Wisconsin, headed for Port Washington, Wisconsin, on Lake Michigan, carrying 170 passengers and a heavy load of cargo. Fire broke out in the area of the engine room at around 6:00 pm, and the steam engines and the paddlewheels soon stopped. The steamer, which was 4–5 miles offshore, quickly became engulfed in flames and smoke. Efforts to use the fire hose were unsuccessful. The passengers panicked while trying to board the lifeboats, capsizing all but one of them. Many jumped overboard into the water, which was reported to be too cold for anyone to survive in it. Several ships in the area rushed to the scene and rescued most of the passengers. The captain and most of the crew survived, but more than 60 on board perished, making it one of Wisconsin's deadliest transportation disasters. Among those lost was John B. Macy, a former member of the United States Congress.

It was reported at the time that the fire was caused by an incendiary. The Captain insisted the fire could not have started in the engine room, because it was fireproof, and blamed combustible cargo stored below. It appears that the cause of the fire was never definitively established.

The wreck of the Niagara lies in 55 feet (17 m) of water one mile (1.6 km) off Belgium, Wisconsin.
