= Hiram Barber =

American politician (1800–1888)

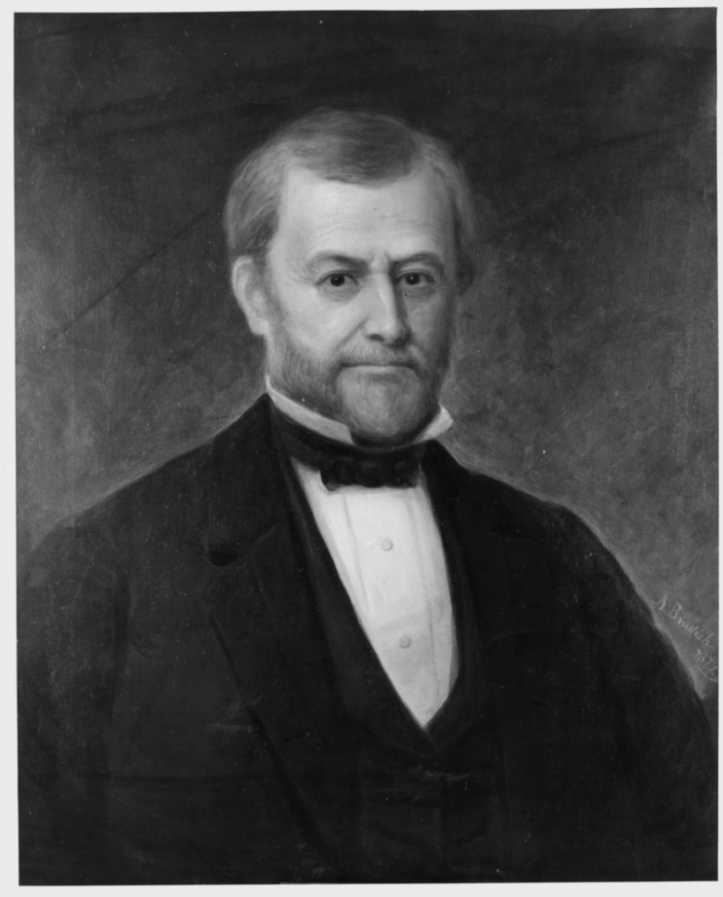

Member of the Wisconsin State Assembly from the Dodge 2nd district
- In office January 10, 1849 – January 9, 1850
- Preceded by: Charles Billinghurst
- Succeeded by: James Murdock

Personal details
- Born: Hiram Barber; January 25, 1800 Hebron, New York, U.S.
- Died: October 23, 1888 (aged 88) Horicon, Wisconsin
- Resting place: Juneau Cemetery; Juneau, Wisconsin
- Party: Democratic (before 1876); Republican (1876)
- Spouse: Salome (Seelye) Barber
- Children: 3 sons, 3 daughters
- Parents: David Barber (father); Hannah (Baker) Barber (mother)
- Profession: businessman, politician

Hiram Barber (January 25, 1800 – October 23, 1888) was an American pioneer, politician, and businessman in Dodge County, Wisconsin.

== Biography ==
Born in Hebron, New York, Barber taught school and was a merchant. He studied law and was admitted to the New York bar. In 1829, Barber was appointed county judge for Warren County, New York, by Governor Martin Van Buren. He remained in this office until his resignation in 1844.

In 1844, Barber moved to the Wisconsin Territory and settled in Horicon, where he had agricultural, manufacturing, and railroad business interests. Barber served in the first Wisconsin Constitutional Convention of 1846.

In the run-up to the first Wisconsin gubernatorial election, Barber became a candidate for Governor of Wisconsin, but at the 1848 Wisconsin Democratic Party Convention he lost the nomination to Nelson Dewey. After becoming Governor, Dewey would appoint Barber to the Board of Regents tasked with organizing the University of Wisconsin.

Later that year, Barber ran for and was elected to represent Dodge County's 2nd district in the 1849 session of the Wisconsin State Assembly.

In 1876, Barber ran for the United States House of Representatives as a Republican in the 5th district, but was defeated by Samuel D. Burchard.

His son was Hiram Barber, Jr., who served in the United States House of Representatives from Illinois. Barber died in Horicon, Wisconsin, in 1888.
