= Eugene S. Turner =

American politician (1824–1915)

Member of the Wisconsin State Assembly from the Washington 2nd district
- In office January 7, 1850 – January 6, 1851
- Preceded by: James Fagan
- Succeeded by: Frederick W. Horn

Personal details
- Born: June 14, 1824 East Oswego, New York, U.S.
- Died: July 15, 1915 (aged 91) Port Washington, Wisconsin, U.S.
- Resting place: Prairie Home Cemetery, Waukesha, Wisconsin
- Party: Democratic
- Spouse: Frances Helen Emeline (Gove) (m. 1850–1915)
- Children: Ione Frances (Wright)^{(b. 1851; died 1918)}; Inez (Eckel)^{(b. 1856; died 1940)}
- Parent: Joseph Turner (father)
- Relatives: Harvey G. Turner (brother)
- Occupation: lawyer, judge, legislator

Eugene Scranton Turner (June 14, 1824 – July 15, 1915) was an American lawyer, Democratic politician, and Wisconsin pioneer. He served one term in the Wisconsin State Assembly, representing parts of Ozaukee and Washington counties during the 3rd Wisconsin Legislature (1850). He later served as district attorney of Washington County, and after Washington and Ozaukee separated, he served as county judge in Ozaukee County.

His father, Joseph Turner, also served as a member of the Wisconsin Assembly. His brother, Harvey G. Turner, was a member of the Wisconsin Senate.

== Biography ==
Born in East Oswego, New York to Joseph and Mary Turner, moved with his parents to Wisconsin Territory in 1840 and settled near present-day Waukesha. Turner studied law and was admitted to the Wisconsin bar in 1846. He served as assistant secretary of the Wisconsin Territorial Executive Council from 1846 to 1847. In 1850 (the 3rd Wisconsin Legislature), Turner served in the Wisconsin State Assembly, succeeding fellow Democrat James Fagan. He also served as district attorney for Washington County, Wisconsin, postmaster at Port Washington, and county judge of Ozaukee County.

When an 1898 convention of former members of the Wisconsin State Legislature was held on the occasion of the Golden jubilee of Wisconsin statehood, Turner was the senior member present, and spoke briefly. Turner died in Port Washington.
