= Constitution of Wisconsin =

American state constitution

Overview
- Jurisdiction: Wisconsin
- Subordinate to: Supreme law of the United States
- Presented: February 1, 1848
- Ratified: March 13, 1848
- System: Constitutional republic

Government structure
- Branches: 4 (legislative, executive, administrative, judicial)
- Chambers: Bicameral
- Executive: Governor
- Judiciary: Supreme, Appeals, Circuits

History
- First legislature: June 5, 1848
- First executive: June 7, 1848
- First court: August 28, 1848
- Amendments: 150
- Last amended: April 2025
- Citation: Wisconsin Constitution, 2024
- Location: Missing; copy on display in the Wisconsin State Capitol rotunda

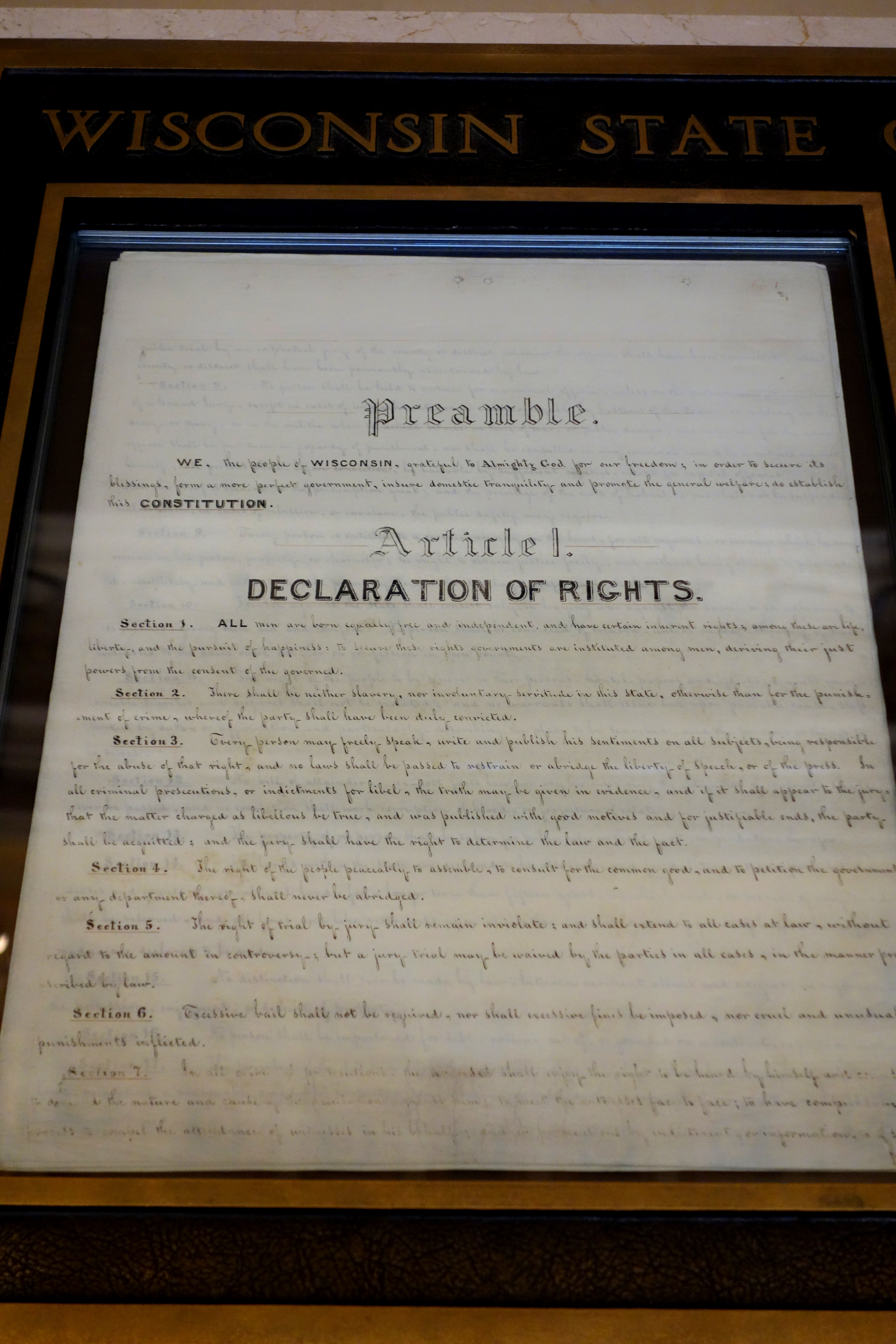
Wisconsin State Constitution, in the Wisconsin State Capitol interior, Madison, Wisconsin, USA.

The Constitution of the State of Wisconsin is the governing document of the U.S. state of Wisconsin. It establishes the structure and function of state government, describes the state boundaries, and declares the rights of state citizens. The Wisconsin Constitution was written at a constitutional convention held in Madison, Wisconsin, in December 1847 and approved by the citizens of Wisconsin Territory in a referendum held in March 1848. Wisconsin was admitted to the United States on May 29, 1848. Although it has been amended over a hundred times, the original constitution ratified in 1848 is still in use. This makes the Wisconsin Constitution the oldest U.S. state constitution outside New England; only Massachusetts, Maine, New Hampshire, and Vermont use older constitutions.

The Wisconsin Constitution contains a brief preamble and fourteen articles detailing the state government, its powers, and its limitations.

== Creation of the Wisconsin Constitution ==
Although Wisconsin continues to use the original constitution ratified as Wisconsin achieved statehood, the current constitution is the second document to be proposed as the state constitution. In 1846, the residents of Wisconsin Territory first voted to apply for statehood, and they elected 124 representatives to meet in Madison to author a state constitution. These delegates, most of them elected as Democrats, met in the fall of 1846 to write the constitution. But the document they produced by December 1846 contained several provisions which were deemed radical at the time. The document gave married women the right to own property and allowed for a public referendum to settle the issue of African American suffrage. In addition, Edward G. Ryan, the delegate from Racine, Wisconsin, introduced a section to the constitution that prohibited all commercial banking in Wisconsin. Not ready to accept some of these provisions, the public rejected the first proposed constitution in a referendum and elected a second delegation to write a constitution which would be more acceptable to the people.

The second constitutional convention produced a much more conservative document that lacked the controversial progressive clauses in its predecessor. The second draft constitution was mute on the controversial issues of women's property rights. It gave suffrage only to white male citizens over the age of twenty one and American Indians that had been made citizens of the United States, but gave the legislature the ability to extend suffrage to other groups through laws approved by public referendum. Although drafted in English, the drafters contracted with publishers of newspapers in the territory, not printed in the English language, to translate the constitution into the languages in which such newspapers were printed. The issue of banking was put to a public vote; citizens could decide for themselves whether or not the state legislature could pass laws allowing banking after the constitution was ratified. The second proposed constitution was finished in December 1847, and was approved by the public in March 1848. During the same election, voters also chose to allow the legislature to charter banks. Shortly after the referendum, the state constitution was ratified by the United States Senate and put into effect with the election of the first state officials.

== Provisions of the current Wisconsin Constitution ==
=== Preamble ===
The Constitution begins with the following preamble:

We, the people of Wisconsin, grateful to Almighty God for our freedom, to secure its blessings, form a more perfect government, insure domestic tranquility and promote the general welfare, do establish this constitution.

— Wisconsin Constitution, preamble

=== Declaration of Rights ===
The first article of the Wisconsin constitution outlines the legal rights of state citizens. In addition to reaffirming the rights guaranteed in the United States Bill of Rights, Article I of the Wisconsin Constitution offers additional guarantees to its citizens. Among these are sections which prohibit slavery, prohibit imprisonment for debt, guarantee resident aliens the same property rights as citizens, affirm that the military is subordinate to civil authorities, allow for the use of state owned school buildings by civil and religious organizations during non-school hours, and guarantee the right of citizens to hunt and fish.

=== Legislature ===
The Wisconsin Legislature is described in Article IV of the Wisconsin Constitution. It is divided into two houses, the Wisconsin State Assembly and Wisconsin State Senate. The constitution sets forth the method of electing legislators and gives their terms as two years for representatives to the assembly and four years for senators. It allows bills to originate in either house, and gives each house the ability to amend bills already passed by the other. In addition, the Wisconsin Constitution outlines certain limitations to the power of the legislative branch of government. The state legislature is prohibited by the constitution from authorizing gambling, although amendments have introduced numerous exceptions to this rule including an allowance for bingo games held by certain non-profit organizations and a state lottery. The legislature is also prohibited from passing legislation affecting certain private business, such as voting to change a person's name.

=== Executive branch ===
Article V of the Wisconsin Constitution describes executive office in the state, providing for a governor and lieutenant governor who are elected jointly to four-year terms. The constitution also outlines the powers and duties of the executive branch. The governor of Wisconsin is given command of the state's military forces and empowered to pardon convicts. The Wisconsin Constitution also allows the governor to veto bills passed by the state legislature.

The constitution was amended in 1930 to grant the governor a uniquely powerful line-item veto on appropriation bills. The power was somewhat reigned-in with a subsequent amendment in 1990, specifying that the governor cannot create a new word in a bill by vetoing certain letters. Rejected bills or portions of bills are then returned to the legislative house where the bill originated, where a vote from two-thirds of the members can override the veto.

Article V also sets forth a line of succession for the governor should he resign, be removed, or die. In the absence of a governor, executive power is transferred to the lieutenant governor, and in cases where both the governor and lieutenant governor are unable to fulfill executive responsibilities, these powers are transferred to the Wisconsin Secretary of State.

=== Administrative Branch ===
Article VI of the Wisconsin Constitution describes other administrative positions, providing for a secretary of state, treasurer, and attorney general to be elected to four-year terms on the same schedule as the governor and lieutenant governor.

Article VI also describes rules for various elected officials on the county level, including sheriffs, coroners, registers of deeds, and district attorneys.

=== Judicial Branch ===
The Wisconsin Constitution outlines the state's judicial branch in Article VII, granting judicial power in the state to a unified Wisconsin Supreme Court consisting of seven justices elected to ten-year terms. The chief justice of the court is elected for a term of two years by the vote of a majority of the justices then serving on the court, although the justice so elected may decline the appointment. In addition to the supreme court, the constitution provides for the Wisconsin Circuit Courts, which each have districts prescribed by the legislature with borders following county boundaries. An intermediary body between the supreme court and the circuit courts, the Wisconsin Court of Appeals, is also established in the state constitution. Finally, the legislature is granted power to form municipal courts with jurisdiction over individual cities, villages, and towns in the state.

In the 1950s the constitution was amended to also allow the state to set a mandatory retirement age for state judges through legislation, but the state has never used this provision.

==== Impeachment ====
Article VII of the Wisconsin Constitution also describes the process for impeaching and trying state officials. A majority of members in the state assembly can vote to impeach a civil officer. The state senate is then given the power to conduct an impeachment trial of the impeached official; conviction requires an affirmative vote of two-thirds of senators present. Wisconsin's constitution limits impeachment to "corrupt conduct in office, or for crimes and misdemeanors", and limits punishment to only removal from office or removal and disqualification from future office.

Wisconsin's constitution also has a separate impeachment-like option for judicial officers called "removal by address". Through this process, the legislature can remove a judge for any reason, but the vote requires two-thirds of both chambers.

=== Education ===
Article X of the Wisconsin Constitution describes the establishment of school districts and a state university, as well as rules, standards, and funding mechanisms for state education. It also establishes the office of superintendent of public instruction, and specifically forbids "sectarian" instruction in public schools.

== Amending the Constitution ==
The process for making changes to the Wisconsin Constitution is stated in Article XII.

Wisconsin does not have petition-based referendums or initiatives; an amendment (including a full replacement of the state's constitution) can be made either via constitutional convention or introduced by either house of the state legislature.

To call a constitutional convention, a majority of the state legislators must vote in favor of holding a new convention, and then the people of Wisconsin must approve the vote to call a convention at the next general election.

If an amendment is introduced via the legislature, its passing requires a lengthy three-vote process:

- First, a majority of members in both houses of the state legislature must vote in favor of the amendment.
- Once the proposed amendment passes both houses for the first time, any further progress in the amendment's adoption must wait until after general elections have been held and the state legislature has reconvened with the members chosen in the new elections; then, both houses must vote a second time to accept the proposed amendment (without changes).
- Should the amendment pass the legislature twice, it must be approved in a third vote by the voters at an election. Historically, this has always been interpreted by the legislature as taking place at a general election, and every successful amendment to the Wisconsin constitution was approved at a general election; Wisconsin holds "general elections" in both Spring and Fall, so the legislature has often attempted to time the passage of an amendment for whether they want the referendum to occur in April or November. In 2024 the legislature took the unusual step of scheduling two constitutional amendment referendums for the Fall primary election in August, but the referendums both failed so the question of legitimacy was not tested.

=== Notable amendments ===
- November 1870: All but eliminated the grand jury system in Wisconsin. (Art. I, Sec. 8)
- November 1881: Converted Wisconsin Legislature from annual to biennial, and expanded terms in office for state legislators to match the longer legislative terms. (Art. IV, Secs. 4, 5, 11)
- April 1889: Changed the position of Chief Justice of the Wisconsin Supreme Court to be the senior-most member of the court, it had previously been a statewide elected office. (Art. VII, Sec. 4)
- November 1926: Enabled recall elections for elected officials to be triggered by petition. (Art. XIII, Sec. 12)
- November 1930: Granted the governor the power of a partial veto on appropriation bills. (Art. V, Sec. 10)
- November 1934: Women's suffrage. (Art. III, Sec. 1)
- April 1953: To change the constitutional guidance on redistricting to put more emphasis on equalizing the geographic size of districts. This amendment was ratified by referendum, but quickly declared invalid by the Wisconsin Supreme Court. (Art. IV, Secs. 3, 4, 5)
- April 1955: To set a mandatory retirement age (70) for state judges. (Art. VII, Sec. 24) This mandatory retirement age was repealed by a later amendment (1977).
- April 1967: Converted the Governor and Lieutenant Governor from 2-year terms to 4-year terms. A separate simultaneous amendment combined the two into a single ticket election, rather than having them as separately elected officers. (Art. V, Secs. 1m, 1n) (Art. V, Sec. 3)
- April 1977: Overhaul of state court system, combining the Wisconsin circuit courts with the county courts. A simultaneous amendment created the Wisconsin Court of Appeals. Another simultaneous amendment repealed the mandatory retirement age for judges, and instead established that the Legislature was enabled to set a mandatory retirement age for judges (which the legislature has never implemented). (Art. VII, Sec. 2) (Art. VII, Sec. 5) (Art. VII, Sec. 24)
- November 2006: Added a prohibition on same-sex marriage or state recognition of any similar marriage-like legal arrangement. This section is inoperative due to the 2014 decision in Wolf v. Walker and the subsequent United States Supreme Court opinion in Obergefell v. Hodges. (Art. XIII, Sec. 13)
- April 2015: Changed the position of Chief Justice of the Wisconsin Supreme Court to a two-year term to be chosen by a majority vote of the members of the court. (Art. VII, Sec. 4)
- November 2024: Changed the suffrage article of the constitution from "Every United States citizen ... is a qualified elector" to "Only a United States citizen ... is a qualified elector". (Art. III, Sec. 1)
- April 2025: Added a new section establishing a photo ID requirement to vote, a requirement that was already in force from 2011's Act 23. (Art. III, Sec. 1m)

== Original document ==
The original copy of the 1848 document is missing. This handwritten copy contained the signatures of all the delegates who drafted it during the second constitutional convention of 1847. As one of the more important artifacts related to the history of the state, the mystery of its whereabouts has become a well known anecdote in the state.

Soon after it was drafted, the original document was submitted to a printer named Horace A. Tenney of Madison, who produced three certified copies. Two of these copies and the original are missing. The one remaining copy contains the names of the original signers, but not the actual signatures. This is the copy that is used for a display in the rotunda of the State Capitol Building.

The first to discover that the original document was missing was historian Lyman Draper, who tried unsuccessfully to locate it in 1882. The topic was first reported by the Milwaukee Sentinel in 1917, and subsequently reported by many other news outlets over the years, including Madison's Capital Times in 1935.

There have been different theories about the document's existence and whereabouts. Two common theories include the notion that the original was never returned by the printer, and also a theory that it was taken as a souvenir by one of the delegates from the constitutional convention.

The first mass printing occurred when printer Beriah Brown issued it in pamphlet form, of which a color facsimile is available for viewing on the website of the state's Historical Society. Although the Beriah Brown printing was laced with many printers' errors and important textual inaccuracies, it was what state residents of the time read when they voted to endorse a Wisconsin constitution in 1848.

=== Delegates and signatories for the 1st constitutional convention (1846) ===
- President of the Convention: Don A. J. Upham of Milwaukee County
- Secretary of the Convention: La Fayette Kellogg of Dane County

=== Delegates and signatories for the 2nd constitutional convention (1847–1848) ===
- President of the Convention: Morgan Lewis Martin of Brown County
- Secretary of the Convention: Thomas McHugh of Walworth County

County	Delegate	Age	Profession	Notes
Brown	Morgan Lewis Martin	42	Attorney	President of the Convention
Calumet	George W. Featherstonhaugh Jr.	33	Miller	
Chippewa & Crawford	Daniel G. Fenton	35	Attorney	
Columbia	James T. Lewis	28	Attorney	Later the governor of Wisconsin
Dane	Charles M. Nichols	48	Merchant	
Dane	William A. Wheeler	33	Millwright	
Dane	William H. Fox	33	Physician	
Dodge	Stoddard Judd	50	Physician	
Dodge	Samuel W. Lyman	49	Farmer	
Dodge	Charles H. Larrabee	27	Attorney	Later a Wisconsin Supreme Court justice and U.S. congressman
Fond du Lac	Samuel W. Beall	40	Land speculator	Later lieutenant governor of Wisconsin
Fond du Lac	Warren Chase	34	Farmer	
Grant	George W. Lakin	31	Attorney	Later U.S. attorney for Wisconsin
Grant	John H. Rountree	42	Farmer	One of the founders of Northwestern Mutual
Grant	Alexander D. Ramsey	44		
Grant	Orsamus Cole	28	Attorney	Later chief justice of the Wisconsin Supreme Court
Grant	William Richardson		Farmer	
Green	James Biggs	49	Farmer	
Green	William McDowell	42	Farmer	
Iowa	Stephen P. Hollenbeck	46	Miner	
Iowa	Charles Bishop			
Iowa	Joseph Ward		Merchant	
Jefferson	Theodore Prentiss	29	Attorney	
Jefferson	Milo Jones	38	Farmer	
Jefferson	Abram Vanderpool	40	Farmer	
Jefferson	Jonas Folts	39	Farmer	
Lafayette	Charles Dunn	47	Attorney	Was then-serving as chief justice of the Wisconsin Territory Supreme Court
Lafayette	Allen Warden	26	Miller	
Lafayette	John O'Connor	33		
Marquette & Winnebago	Harrison Reed	34	Journalist	Later governor of Florida
Milwaukee	Byron Kilbourn	46	Land surveyor	One of the founders of Milwaukee
Milwaukee	Rufus King	33	Journalist	Civil War general
Milwaukee	Charles H. Larkin	37	Real estate developer	
Milwaukee	John L. Doran	31–32	Attorney	
Milwaukee	Garrett M. Fitzgerald	41		
Milwaukee	Moritz Schoeffler	34	Printer	
Milwaukee	Albert Fowler	45	Clerk	
Portage	William H. Kennedy	30	Lumberman	
Racine	Theodore Secor	33	Farmer	
Racine	Samuel R. McClellan	41	Physician	
Racine	Horace T. Sanders	27	Attorney	Civil War general
Racine	Frederick S. Lovell	34	Attorney	Later speaker of the Wisconsin State Assembly and a Civil War general
Racine	Stephen A. Davenport	41	Farmer	
Racine	Andrew B. Jackson	33		
Racine	Albert G. Cole	28	Attorney	
Racine	James DeNoon Reymert	26	Journalist	
Rock	Almerin M. Carter	33	Farmer	
Rock	Ezra A. Foot	38	Farmer	
Rock	Edward V. Whiton	42	Attorney	Later chief justice of the Wisconsin Supreme Court
Rock	Paul Crandall	45	Farmer	
Rock	Joseph Colley	68		
Rock	Louis P. Harvey	27	Journalist	Later governor of Wisconsin
St. Croix	George W. Brownell		Miner	
Sheboygan & Manitowoc	Silas Steadman		Farmer	
Walworth	James Harrington		Carpenter	
Walworth	Augustus C. Kinne	39	Farmer	
Walworth	George Gale	31	Attorney	Later a Wisconsin circuit court judge
Walworth	Experience Estabrook	34	Attorney	Later attorney general of Wisconsin
Walworth	Hollis Latham	35	Farmer	
Walworth	Ezra A. Mulford	43	Physician	
Washington	Patrick Pentony			
Washington	James Fagan	41	Farmer	
Washington	Harvey G. Turner	25	Attorney	
Waukesha	Peter D. Gifford	33	Lawyer	
Waukesha	George Scagel	48	Farmer	
Waukesha	Squire S. Case	46	Laborer	
Waukesha	Alfred L. Castleman	38	Physician	Union Army surgeon
Waukesha	Emulous P. Cotton	35	Miller	Founder of Cottonville, Wisconsin
Waukesha	Eleazer Root	45	Educator	Later superintendent of public instruction of Wisconsin
