= Charles Billinghurst =

American politician (1818–1865)

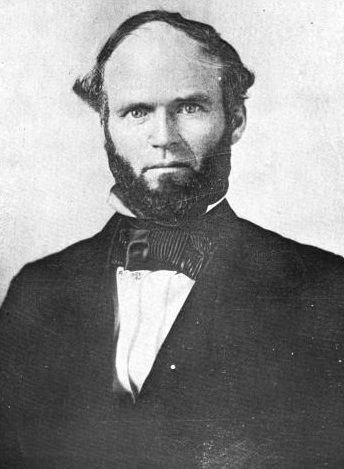

Member of the U.S. House of Representatives from Wisconsin's 3rd district
- In office March 4, 1855 – March 3, 1859
- Preceded by: John B. Macy
- Succeeded by: Charles H. Larrabee

Member of the Wisconsin State Assembly from the Dodge 2nd district
- In office June 5, 1848 – January 1, 1849
- Preceded by: Position established
- Succeeded by: Hiram Barber

Personal details
- Born: July 27, 1818 Brighton, Monroe County, New York, U.S.
- Died: August 18, 1865 (aged 47) Juneau, Wisconsin, U.S.
- Resting place: Juneau Cemetery, Juneau
- Party: Republican; Democratic (before 1854)
- Spouse: Hannah Barber (m. 1853–1865)
- Children: Charles Bryan Billinghurst^{(b. 1854; died 1938)}; William Seeley Billinghurst^{(b. 1857; died 1940)}
- Parent: William Billinghurst III (father)
- Relatives: Hiram Barber (father-in-law)
- Profession: Lawyer

Charles Billinghurst (July 27, 1818 – August 18, 1865) was an American lawyer, politician, and Wisconsin pioneer. He served two terms in the U.S. House of Representatives, representing Wisconsin's 3rd congressional district for the 34th and 35th congresses (1855–1859). He served in Congress as a member of the Republican Party, but had been a loyal and vocal Democrat up until the year of his first congressional nomination in 1854.

He had served in the 1st Wisconsin Legislature (1848) as a Democrat, owned a Democratic partisan newspaper—the Juneau Burr Oak—and was a Democratic presidential elector in 1852. But like many northern Democrats, he was outraged by the Kansas–Nebraska Act and the abandonment of the Missouri Compromise; he came to fully embrace the new Republican Party during his first term in Congress, and served as a leader in the Republican Party of Wisconsin for the rest of his life.

== Early life ==
Billinghurst was born in Brighton, Monroe County, New York, on July 27, 1818. He was raised on his father's farm and received a common school education, then read law in the office of attorney Horace Gay, in Rochester, New York. He was admitted to the New York bar in 1845, and formed a partnership with Henry R. Selden in Rochester.

Shortly after beginning his legal career, however, Billinghurst suffered serious health problems—the earliest documented case of his lifelong affliction that caused bleeding of the lungs. On his doctor's advice, he quit his law practice and traveled west, touring Indiana and Kentucky on horseback. After returning to Rochester, he was able to resume his practice for some time, but ultimately his symptoms returned; he decided to relocate permanently to the west.

== Early political career ==
In the fall of 1847, he settled the Wisconsin Territory, in the settlement that would become the village of Juneau, Wisconsin, in Dodge County; this would become his primary residence for the rest of his life. Shortly after arriving in Wisconsin, Billinghurst decided to resume his legal career, and opened an office.

He quickly became involved in politics in Wisconsin, with the Democratic Party. After Wisconsin ratified its constitution in March of 1848, Billinghurst was nominated by the Democratic Party convention in Dodge County as one of their candidates for Wisconsin State Assembly; his district was the Dodge County 2nd district, which comprised Oak Grove township—where Billinghurst resided—along with Hubbard, Herman, and Rubicon. Billinghurst defeated Whig candidate William M. Larrabee in the May 1848 election, and went on to serve in the 1st Wisconsin Legislature.

In 1849, Billinghurst was appointed postmaster at Juneau (then known as Dodge Center), but served only about a year in that role. During 1849, he also served as chairman of the Democratic Party of Dodge County. He was chosen for the Democratic Party's slate of presidential electors in the 1852 United States presidential election. Wisconsin voted for the Democratic slate, and Billinghurst cast his electoral vote on behalf of Franklin Pierce.

In September 1853, Billinghurst purchased the Whig partisan newspaper the Dodge County Gazette from Robert B. Wentworth, and relaunched it as a Democratic partisan newspaper known as the Juneau Burr Oak. Less than a year later, however, the Kansas–Nebraska Act prompted Billinghurst to question his affiliation with the Democratic Party. The Kansas–Nebraska Act also prompted broader outrage in Wisconsin, exacerbating existing tensions over enforcement of the Fugitive Slave Act of 1850, and prompting the creation of the anti-slavery Republican Party.

== Congress (1854–1859) ==
Wisconsin's 3rd congressional district 1848–1861

While he was outraged and rebellious over the Kansas–Nebraska Act, Billinghurst did not immediately embrace the new Republican Party. In the summer of 1854, his name was mentioned as a potential candidate for Congress for either the Democratic or Republican ticket. In the fall of 1854, Billinghurst attended the Republican district convention at Waupun and accepted their nomination for U.S. House of Representatives in Wisconsin's 3rd congressional district. In this era, the 3rd congressional district comprised nearly the entire eastern half of the state, other than the more densely populated southeast corner.

The nomination was not a foregone conclusion, however. At the convention, Billinghurst was pressed and refused to accept the full Republican platform; delegates to the convention, mostly former Whigs and Free Soilers, were hesitant to offer him their support. After ten informal ballots, the former Whig James McMillan Shafter reached an apparent majority that would have won him the nomination. But Shafter spoke to the convention and declined the nomination, saying that the nominee in that district should be a former Democrat. Finally, Billinghurst came to an agreement with the delegates, the convention moved to a formal ballot and Billinghurst was nominated.

Although he was nominated by the Republicans, his party affiliation remained somewhat ambiguous through the election, as he was still sometimes described as simply an anti-Nebraska Democrat. Carefully balancing his old Democratic identity with principled opposition to slavery, Billinghurst was able to build an electoral majority with Whig, Democrat, and Free Soil support. At the same time, his incumbent Democratic opponent, John B. Macy, faced significant opposition within his own party, and the Ozaukee County Democrats actually nominated a protest candidate, judge Harvey G. Turner. Billinghurst was easily elected in the November general election, receiving about 55% of the vote. Even after the election, however, newspapers speculated that he might revert to the Democratic caucus once in Washington. Billinghurst also did not appear eager to follow through on some of the promises he had made to secure his nomination; he flatly refused to appear in Madison to endorse the U.S. Senate candidacy of James McMillan Shafter.

Despite early fits, over the course of 1855, Billinghurst further ingratiated himself with the new Republican Party. After arriving in Washington, his fragmented, evolving political identity matched the spirit of the 34th U.S. Congress that he was joining; party definitions were loose and undefined, no party held a majority in the House, and the election of a speaker dragged out for 133 ballots over three months. Billinghurst remained a reliable vote in the Opposition coalition, and gradually solidified his place in the nascent Republican Party. Once the Republican coalition was able to organize the House, Billinghurst was appointed to the powerful House Ways and Means Committee.

Billinghurst was unanimously renominated at the 1856 Republican district convention. With partisan lines hardening again, he faced a more difficult race for re-election, but defeated Democrat Harrison C. Hobart with 52% of the vote. Billinghurst then served as chairman of the state Republican convention in 1857, which nominated Alexander Randall for governor.

In the 35th U.S. Congress, Democrats regained the majority. Serving in the minority, Billinghurst was removed from the prestigious Ways and Means committee and instead placed on the committee on boundaries. In 1858, Billinghurst faced a challenge for renomination from Elihu Phillips and others at the district convention, but he ultimately prevailed on the first ballot with 59 of 115 delegate votes. His Democratic opponent in the general election was Charles H. Larrabee, a popular Wisconsin circuit court judge. After a spirited campaign, Billinghurst fell 894 votes short of Larrabee, receiving 49% of the vote. After the election, Billinghurst suffered a recurrence of his chronic lung illness and was unable to participate in most of the lame duck session of the Congress.

== Later years ==
Returning to Wisconsin, Billinghurst recovered from his illness and resumed his legal practice. He remained active in the political debates in the lead up to the American Civil War. He continued an ongoing constitutional debate over nullification with former Wisconsin judge Timothy O. Howe; Billinghurst favored the Wisconsin Legislature and Wisconsin Supreme Court in their attempts to nullify enforcement of the federal Fugitive Slave Acts within Wisconsin, attempting to draw a legal distinction between nullification in Wisconsin and nullification in South Carolina.

In the summer of 1859, Billinghurst was rumored to be among several prominent Republicans looking to challenge incumbent Alexander Randall for the Republican gubernatorial nomination in 1859. But Billinghurst ultimately disowned any such plans, and supported Randall at the 1859 convention. In 1860, Billinghurst was a member of the central committee of the Republican Party of Wisconsin. In the spring of 1860, he ran for chairman of his local town board, but lost in surprising fashion to pioneer Joel Rich. Billinghurst campaigned extensively for Abraham Lincoln and the Republican ticket in 1860, and was active in supporting the Union cause through the subsequent American Civil War. In 1864, he was authorized to begin recruiting his own regiment of hundred-days volunteers for the Union Army, but his health was too poor to participate, and his recruits were ultimately incorporated into the 39th Wisconsin Infantry Regiment.

His health continued to decline through 1865. In the summer of 1865, he was confined to his bed; he died at his home in Juneau on August 18, 1865, at age 47. His body was interred in Juneau Cemetery.

== Personal life and family ==
Charles Billinghurst was the eighth of twelve children born to William Billinghurst III and his wife Julia (née Bryan). William Billinghurst was an English immigrant and a pioneer of western New York. He was one of the earliest settlers at the town of Brighton, Monroe County, and represented the area in the New York State Assembly.

Charles' elder brother William Billinghurst IV was a celebrated gunsmith and riflemaker. He made an early model for a revolving rifle, and claimed that the Colt revolver was an infringement on his design. With his apprentice, Josephus Requa, he was also one of the inventors of the Billinghurst Requa Battery—another early attempt at creating a rapid-fire gun.

In 1853, Charles Billinghurst married Hannah Barber, the daughter of another prominent Dodge County pioneer, Hiram Barber. Charles and Hannah had two sons together, Charles Bryan Billinghurst and William Seeley Billinghurst, who both survived them.

Their elder son, Charles Bryan Billinghurst, became a newspaper publisher in the Dakota Territory, advocating against railroad monopolies. He was also the founder of Ashton, South Dakota.

== Electoral history ==
=== Wisconsin Assembly (1848) ===
Year	Election	Date	Elected				Defeated				Total	Plurality
1848	General	May 8	Charles Billinghurst	Democratic	234	58.21%	William M. Larrabee	Whig	168	41.79%	402	66

=== U.S. House (1854, 1856, 1858) ===
Year	Election	Date	Elected				Defeated				Total	Plurality
1854	General	Nov. 7	Charles Billinghurst	Republican	13,359	55.75%	John B. Macy (inc)	Dem.	8,596	35.87%	23,962	4,763
1854	General	Nov. 7	Charles Billinghurst	Republican	13,359	55.75%	Harvey G. Turner	Ind.D.	1,924	8.03%	23,962	4,763
1856	General	Nov. 4	Charles Billinghurst (inc)	Republican	26,092	52.01%	Harrison C. Hobart	Dem.	24,045	47.93%	50,167	2,047
1858	General	Nov. 2	Charles H. Larrabee	Democratic	23,905	50.95%	Charles Billinghurst (inc)	Rep.	23,011	49.05%	46,916	894

Wisconsin State Assembly
New state government	Member of the Wisconsin State Assembly from the Dodge 2nd district June 5, 1848 – January 1, 1849	Succeeded by Hiram Barber
U.S. House of Representatives
Preceded by John B. Macy	Member of the U.S. House of Representatives from Wisconsin's 3rd congressional district March 4, 1855 – March 3, 1859	Succeeded by Charles H. Larrabee
