= Zalmon Wildman =

American politician

Zalmon Wildman (February 16, 1775 – December 10, 1835) was an American businessman and banker who served several months as a United States representative from Connecticut in 1835.

== Early life ==
He was born in Danbury, Connecticut where he completed preparatory studies. He was manufacturer of hats in Danbury—known as 'Hat City' -- and established the first hat shops from there in Charleston, South Carolina and Savannah, Georgia in 1802. In addition, he was the first president of Danbury National Bank from 1824 to 1826.

== Political career ==
Wildman was a member of the Connecticut House of Representatives in 1818 and 1819. He was appointed postmaster of Danbury, Connecticut and served from April 9, 1805, to May 26, 1835.

=== Congress ===
He was elected as a Jacksonian to the Twenty-fourth Congress and served from March 4, 1835, until his death.

=== Death and burial ===
He died in Washington, D.C., December 10, 1835. He was buried in Wooster Cemetery, Danbury, Connecticut.

== See also ==
- List of members of the United States Congress who died in office (1790–1899)

U.S. House of Representatives
Preceded by Samuel Tweedy	Member of the U.S. House of Representatives from Connecticut's at-large congressional district March 4, 1835 - December 10, 1835	Succeeded by Thomas T. Whittlesey
