= Dunkirk, Wisconsin =

Town of Dunkirk
- Town
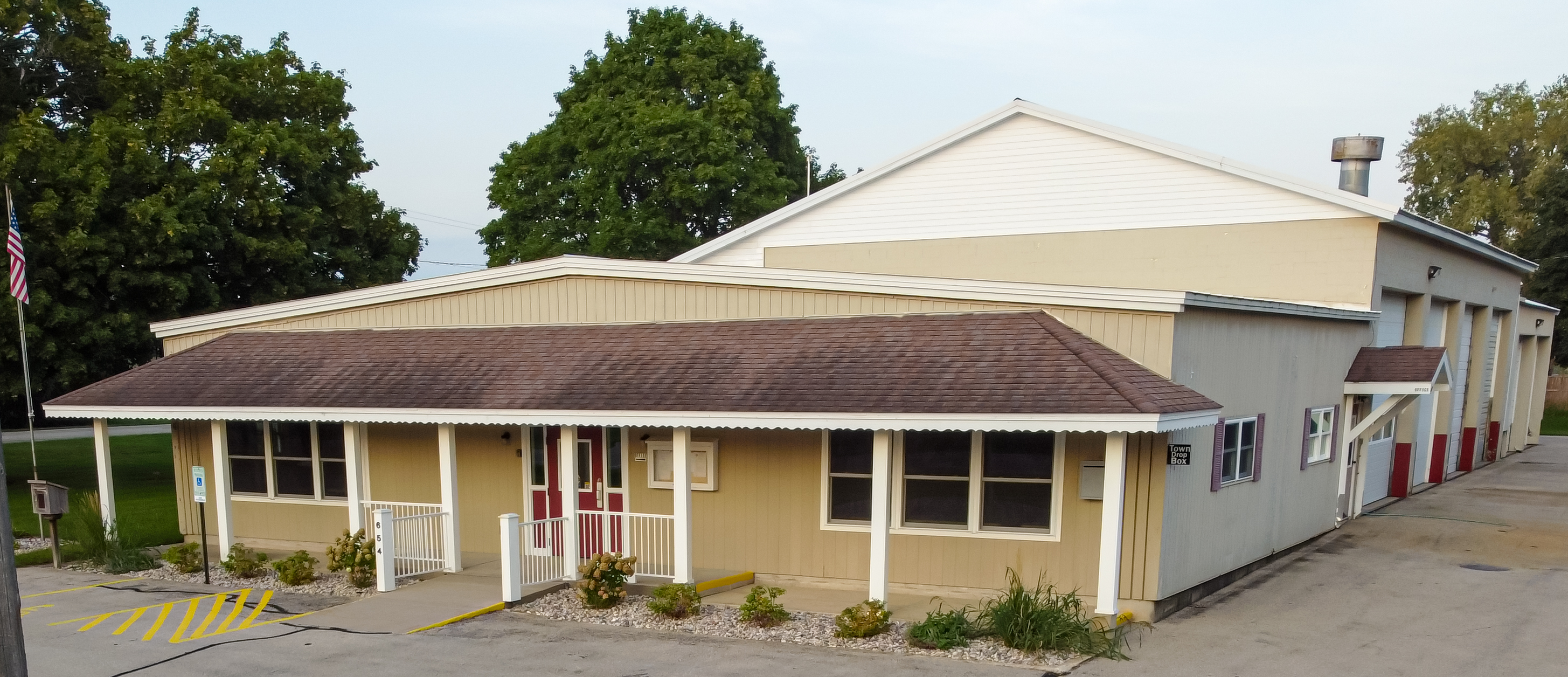
- Town hall

- Location in Dane County and the state of Wisconsin.
- Coordinates: 42°53′41″N 89°11′49″W
- Country: United States
- State: Wisconsin
- County: Dane

Area
  - Total: 32.3 sq mi (83.7 km^{2})
  - Land: 31.9 sq mi (82.6 km^{2})
  - Water: 0.42 sq mi (1.1 km^{2})
- Elevation: 889 ft (271 m)

Population (2020)
  - Total: 1,881
  - Density: 59.0/sq mi (22.8/km^{2})
- Time zone: UTC-6 (Central (CST))
  - Summer (DST): UTC-5 (CDT)
- Area code: 608
- FIPS code: 55-21100
- GNIS feature ID: 1583104

The Town of Dunkirk is located in Dane County, Wisconsin, United States. The population was 1,881 at the 2020 census. The unincorporated community of Hanerville, which was named for James Haner, who had moved from Easton, New York in 1844, is located in the town.

== Geography ==
According to the United States Census Bureau, the town has a total area of 32.3 square miles (83.7 km^{2}), of which 31.9 square miles (82.6 km^{2}) is land and 0.4 square mile (1.1 km^{2}) (1.27%) is water.

== Demographics ==
At the 2000 census there were 2,053 people, 760 households, and 595 families living in the town. The population density was 64.3 people per square mile (24.8/km^{2}). There were 776 housing units at an average density of 24.3 per square mile (9.4/km^{2}). The racial makeup of the town was 98.15% White, 0.19% African American, 0.19% Native American, 0.49% Asian, 0.10% from other races, and 0.88% from two or more races. Hispanic or Latino of any race were 1.02%.

There were 760 households, 36.8% had children under the age of 18 living with them, 69.2% were married couples living together, 5.5% had a female householder with no husband present, and 21.6% were non-families. 16.3% of households were one person and 5.4% were one person aged 65 or older. The average household size was 2.70 and the average family size was 3.03.

The age distribution was 26.2% under the age of 18, 6.0% from 18 to 24, 30.7% from 25 to 44, 28.5% from 45 to 64, and 8.6% 65 or older. The median age was 39 years. For every 100 females, there were 106 males. For every 100 females age 18 and over, there were 102 males.

The median household income was $62,426 and the median family income was $66,587. Males had a median income of $41,316 versus $28,448 for females. The per capita income for the town was $26,609. About 3.3% of families and 3.0% of the population were below the poverty line, including 3.9% of those under age 18 and 3.7% of those age 65 or over.

== Notable people ==
- Ella Giles Ruddy, author, editor
