= John B. Macy =

American politician

Member of the U.S. House of Representatives from Wisconsin's 3rd district
- In office March 4, 1853 – March 3, 1855
- Preceded by: James Duane Doty
- Succeeded by: Charles Billinghurst

Personal details
- Born: March 25, 1799 Nantucket, Massachusetts, US
- Died: September 24, 1856 (aged 57) Port Washington, Wisconsin, US
- Party: Democratic
- Spouse: Mary Russell Macy (m. 1818)
- Children: Four

John B. Macy (March 25, 1799 – September 24, 1856) was a U.S. Representative from Wisconsin.

Macy was born in Nantucket, Massachusetts, where he received a liberal education. He moved to New York City in 1826 and later in that year to Buffalo, New York. He resided in Cincinnati, Ohio from 1842 to 1845. Macy was one of the founders of Toledo, Ohio, and one of the proprietors of the Rock River Valley Union Railroad (the state line to Fond du Lac, Wisconsin). This line was the beginning of the Chicago and North Western Railway. Macy moved to Fond du Lac in the Wisconsin Territory, in 1845 and engaged in the real estate business, acquiring land from Philip Hone, the mayor of New York City. Several street names in Fond du Lac, such as Macy Street, are named for Macy and members of his family. He moved with his family to the town of Empire, Wisconsin, near Lake de Neveu, in 1850. Macy's home, built near what became Highway 45, still stands. Its original outbuildings include a hexagonal library.

Macy was elected as a Democrat to represent Wisconsin's 3rd congressional district at the 33rd United States Congress (March 4, 1853 – March 3, 1855), but was unsuccessful for re-election in 1854 to the 34th Congress. Following his failure to be re-elected, he resumed his former business pursuits.

== Death ==
Macy lost his life in the burning of the steamer Niagara, near Port Washington, Wisconsin on Lake Michigan on September 24, 1856. The Niagara was a sidewheel passenger steamer, one of the luxury vessels known as 'palace steamers', which sailed the Great Lakes in the years from 1844 to 1857. On September 23, 1856, the Niagara left Sheboygan, Wisconsin, for Port Washington. Fire broke out on board at around 4pm, causing the steam engines and the ship's giant paddlewheels to stop. The steamer, which was 4–5 miles offshore, quickly became engulfed in flames and smoke, and the passengers panicked while trying to board the lifeboats. Many jumped overboard into the water, which was reported to be too cold for anyone to survive in it. Despite rescue efforts, over 60 people died in what was one of Wisconsin's deadliest transportation disasters. The wreck of the Niagara lies in 55 feet of water one mile off Belgium, Wisconsin. Macy was last seen on board exclaiming "We're lost! Oh God! We're lost!" His body was never recovered.

== Other sources ==
- United States Congress. "John B. Macy (id: M000036)". Biographical Directory of the United States Congress.

U.S. House of Representatives
Preceded by James Duane Doty	Member of the U.S. House of Representatives from Wisconsin's 3rd congressional district March 4, 1853 – March 3, 1855	Succeeded by Charles Billinghurst
