= Adelmorn Sherman =

American politician

Adelmorn Sherman (January 30, 1820 – January 26, 1875) was an American farmer and politician.

Born in Berne, New York, Sherman moved to Wisconsin Territory in 1844 and settled in Rock County, Wisconsin. He lived in La Prairie, Wisconsin. Sherman was a farmer. He served as the town superintendent of public schools and as the town board chairman. From 1869 to 1871, Sherman served in the Wisconsin State Assembly as a Republican. He died at his home in La Prairie, Wisconsin.
