= Frederick Sprague =

American politician

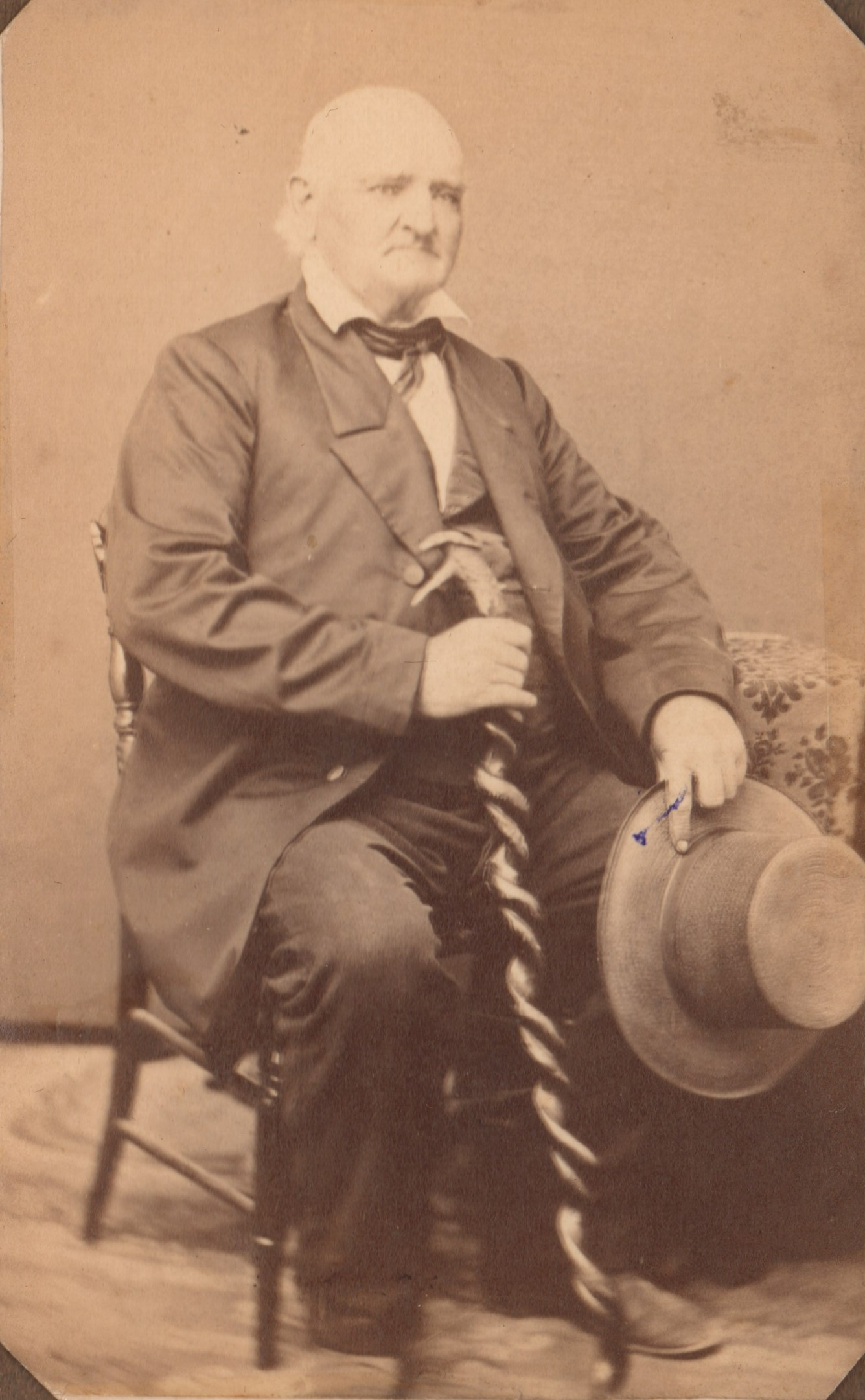
Frederick Augustus Sprague

Frederick Augustus Sprague (May 3, 1794 – February 4, 1865) was a farmer, homeopathic physician, military officer and politician who served as a member of the Wisconsin State Senate during the 1849 and 1850 sessions. He was a Democrat.

== Biography ==
Frederick was born in Malden Massachusetts to Doctor John Sprague and Elizabeth Poole. He enlisted in the Army when he was 18 years old for the War of 1812. He later served as a Colonel in the Ohio Militia. In 1842 he moved to Eagle, Wisconsin after he lost everything in the Ohio land speculation. In Eagle, he was a farmer and homeopathic physician where by using plants from the Eagle prairie he created homeopathic remedies such as Extract of Wisconsin Balm, Wisconsin Balsam, Extract of Wisconsin Gum, and Extract of Wisconsin Myrrh.

== Marriage and children ==
In 1820 he married Miss Bridget Moody in Medina, Ohio who was from Industry, Maine. They had 11 children, nine of them living past infanthood and moving to Eagle, Wisconsin. The family was a prominent family in the founding of Eagle, Wisconsin with Frederick farming 200 acres and the family owning 740 acres and his son Romeo Sprague being in a partnership with Thomas Putman and William Kline to develop the Village of Eagle.

== Death ==
Sprague died in Eagle, Wisconsin, on February 4, 1865. He is interred in Jericho Cemetery, Eagle Wisconsin.
