= Benjamin H. Mooers =

American politician

Benjamin H. Mooers was an American politician. He was a member of the Wisconsin State Assembly during the 1848 session. Mooers represented the 2nd District of Washington County, Wisconsin. He was a Democrat.
