= 2nd Wisconsin Territorial Assembly =

Legislative term of the Wisconsin Territory

←	1st	3rd	→

Overview
- Legislative body: Legislative Assembly of the Wisconsin Territory
- Meeting place: Madison, Wisconsin Territory
- Term: November 5, 1838 – November 2, 1840
- Election: October 8, 1838

Council
- Members: 13
- President: William Bullen^{(1st session)}; James Collins^{(2nd & 3rd session)}; William A. Prentiss^{(extra session)}

House of Representatives
- Members: 24 (1st & 2nd sessions); 26 (3rd & extra sessions)
- Speaker: John Wilford Blackstone Sr. (W)^{(1st session)}; Lucius Israel Barber (W)^{(2nd session)}; Edward V. Whiton (W)^{(3rd session)}; Nelson Dewey (D)^{(extra session)}

Sessions
- 1st: November 26, 1838 – December 22, 1838
- 2nd: January 21, 1839 – March 11, 1839
- 3rd: December 2, 1839 – January 13, 1840

Special sessions
- Extra: August 3, 1840 – August 14, 1840

The Second Legislative Assembly of the Wisconsin Territory convened from November 26, 1838, to December 22, 1838, from January 21, 1839, to March 11, 1839, and from December 2, 1839, to January 13, 1840, in regular session. The Assembly also convened in an extra session from August 3, 1840, to August 14, 1840.

== Major events ==
- September 4, 1839: The Battle of Kowloon marked the start of the First Opium War between the United Kingdom of Great Britain and Ireland and the Qing dynasty.
- July 1, 1839: Enslaved Africans aboard the Amistad rebelled at took control of the ship.
- December 1839: Horatio N. Wells appointed the 2nd Attorney General for the Wisconsin Territory.
- December 2, 1839: The first edition of the Madison Express was published at Madison.
- December 6, 1839: The first national convention of the Whig Party was held at Harrisburg, Pennsylvania, and nominated General William Henry Harrison for President of the United States.
- October 3 – December 2, 1840: William Henry Harrison elected President of the United States.

== Major legislation ==
- December 20, 1839: An Act to amend an act entitled "An Act to provide for and regulate General Elections," 1839 Wisc. Terr. Act 1. Changed the date of general elections to the fourth Monday in September.
- January 8, 1840: An Act to prevent the sale of intoxicating liquors to Indians, 1840 Wis. Terr. Act 17.
- January 11, 1840: An Act to provide for taking the census, or enumeration of the inhabitants of this Territory, and to fix the time of holding an extra session of the Legislative Assembly, 1839 Wis. Terr. Act 27.
- January 13, 1840: An Act limiting the term of office of all officers of this Territory, not now limited by law, 1839 Wisc. Terr. Act 50. Set a 2-year term for all Wisconsin Territory offices not previously described by law.

== Sessions ==
- 1st session: November 26, 1838 – December 22, 1838
- 2nd session: January 21, 1839 – March 11, 1839
- 3rd session: December 2, 1839 – January 13, 1840
- Extra session: August 3, 1840 – August 14, 1840

== Leadership ==
=== Council President ===
- William Bullen - during the 1st session
- James Collins - during the 2nd and 3rd sessions
- William A. Prentiss - during the extra session

=== Speaker of the House of Representatives ===
- John Wilford Blackstone Sr. (W) - during the 1st session
- Lucius Israel Barber (W) - during the 2nd session
- Edward V. Whiton (W) - during the 3rd session
- Nelson Dewey (D) - during the extra session

== Members ==
=== Members of the Council ===
Members of the Council for the Second Legislative Assembly:

Counties	Councillor	Session(s)				Party
Counties	Councillor	1st	2nd	3rd	Ex.	Party
Brown	Alexander J. Irwin	✓	✓			
Brown	Morgan Lewis Martin	✓	✓	✓	✓	Dem.
Brown	Charles C. P. Arndt			✓	✓	Whig
Crawford	George Wilson	✓	✓			
Crawford	Joseph Brisbois			✓		
Crawford	Charles J. Learned				✓	
Dane, Dodge, Green, & Jefferson	Ebenezer Brigham	✓	✓	✓	✓	
Grant	James R. Vineyard	✓	✓	✓	✓	Dem.
Grant	John H. Rountree	✓	✓	✓	✓	Whig
Iowa	James Collins	✓	✓	✓	✓	Whig
Iowa	Levi Sterling	✓	✓	✓	✓	Whig
Milwaukee & Washington	Daniel Wells Jr.	✓	✓	✓	✓	Whig
Milwaukee & Washington	William A. Prentiss	✓	✓	✓	✓	Whig
Racine	William Bullen	✓	✓	✓	✓	
Racine	Marshall M. Strong	✓	✓			Dem.
Racine	Lorenzo Janes			✓	✓	Dem.
Rock & Walworth	James Maxwell	✓	✓	✓	✓	

=== Members of the House of Representatives ===
Members of the House of Representatives for the Second Legislative Assembly:

Counties	Representative	Session(s)				Party
Counties	Representative	1st	2nd	3rd	Ex.	Party
Brown	Ebenezer Childs	✓	✓	✓	✓	
Brown	Charles C. Sholes	✓	✓	✓	✓	Dem.
Brown	Barlow Shackleford	✓	✓	✓	✓	
Brown	Jacob W. Conroe	✓	✓	✓	✓	
Crawford	Alexander McGregor	✓	✓	✓	✓	
Crawford	Ira B. Brunson		✓	✓	✓	Dem.
Dane, Dodge, Green, & Jefferson	Daniel S. Sutherland	✓	✓	✓	✓	
Grant	Thomas Cruson	✓	✓	✓	✓	Whig
Grant	Nelson Dewey	✓	✓	✓	✓	Dem.
Grant	Ralph Carver	✓	✓			
Grant	Joseph H. D. Street	✓	✓	✓	✓	
Grant	Jonathan Craig			✓	✓	
Iowa	Russel Baldwin	✓	✓	✓	✓	
Iowa	John W. Blackstone	✓	✓	✓	✓	Whig
Iowa	Henry M. Billings	✓	✓	✓	✓	Dem.
Iowa	Thomas Jenkins	✓	✓	✓	✓	Dem.
Iowa	Charles Bracken		✓	✓	✓	Dem.
Milwaukee & Washington	Lucius I. Barber	✓	✓			Whig
Milwaukee & Washington	William Shew	✓	✓	✓	✓	Dem.
Milwaukee & Washington	Henry C. Skinner	✓	✓			
Milwaukee & Washington	Ezekiel Churchill	✓	✓			
Milwaukee & Washington	Augustus Story	✓	✓	✓	✓	
Milwaukee & Washington	Adam E. Ray			✓	✓	
Milwaukee & Washington	William R. Longstreet			✓	✓	
Milwaukee & Washington	Horatio N. Wells			✓	✓	Dem.
Racine	Orrin R. Stevens	✓	✓	✓	✓	
Racine	Zadoc Newman	✓	✓	✓	✓	
Racine	Tristam C. Hoyt	✓	✓	✓	✓	
Rock & Walworth	Othni Beardsley	✓	✓	✓	✓	
Rock & Walworth	Edward V. Whiton	✓	✓	✓	✓	Whig

== Employees ==
=== Council employees ===
- Secretary:
  - George Beatty, all sessions
- Sergeant-at-Arms:
  - Stephen N. Ives, 1st & 2nd sessions
  - Thomas J. Noyes, 3rd session
  - Gilbert Knapp, extra session

=== House employees ===
- Chief Clerk:
  - John Catlin, all sessions
- Sergeant-at-Arms:
  - Thomas Morgan, 1st session
  - Thomas J. Moorman, 2nd session
  - James Durley, 3rd session
  - D. M. Whitney, extra session
- Other notable staff:
  - George Batchelder, transcribing clerk
  - Robert H. Hotchkiss, fireman
