= 3rd Wisconsin Territorial Assembly =

Legislative term of the Wisconsin Territory

←	2nd	4th	→

Overview
- Legislative body: Legislative Assembly of the Wisconsin Territory
- Meeting place: Madison, Wisconsin Territory
- Term: November 2, 1840 – November 7, 1842
- Election: September 28, 1840

Council
- Members: 13
- President: James Maxwell^{(1st session)}; James Collins^{(2nd session)}

House of Representatives
- Members: 27
- Speaker: David Newland (D)

Sessions
- 1st: December 7, 1840 – February 19, 1841
- 2nd: December 6, 1841 – February 19, 1842

The Third Legislative Assembly of the Wisconsin Territory convened from December 7, 1840, to February 19, 1841, and from December 6, 1841, to February 19, 1842, in regular session.

The second session saw one of the most infamous acts of political violence in Wisconsin history, when Councillor James Russell Vineyard shot and killed fellow councillor Charles C. P. Arndt after an argument in the Council chamber on February 11, 1842.

== Major events ==
- January 26, 1841: The United Kingdom of Great Britain and Ireland took control of Hong Kong.
- February 10, 1841: The Act of Union was proclaimed in Montreal, establishing the Province of Canada.
- March 4, 1841: Inauguration of William Henry Harrison as the 9th President of the United States.
- March 9, 1841: The Supreme Court of the United States ruled in United States v. The Amistad that the Africans who seized control of the ship had been taken into slavery illegally.
- April 4, 1841: President William Henry Harrison died of pneumonia.
- April 6, 1841: Inauguration of John Tyler as the 10th President of the United States.
- August 16, 1841: President John Tyler vetoed the bill which would have established the Second Bank of the United States. Enraged Whigs rioted outside the White House.
- December 20, 1841: The Treaty for the Suppression of the African Slave Trade was signed in London by representatives of Austria, Britain, France, Prussia, and Russia.
- February 11, 1842: After a heated argument on the floor of the Wisconsin Territory Council over the appointment of Enos S. Baker as Sheriff of Grant County, Councillor James Russell Vineyard shot and killed Councillor Charles C. P. Arndt. Vineyard subsequently attempted to resign from the Council—his resignation was refused and he was instead expelled.

== Major legislation ==
- February 19, 1841: An Act to provide for the completion of the Capitol at Madison, 1841, Wisc. Terr. Act 37.
- February 18, 1842: Resolutions relative to the removal of Indians.

== Sessions ==
- 1st session: December 7, 1840 – February 19, 1841
- 2nd session: December 6, 1841 – February 19, 1842

== Leadership ==
=== Council President ===
- James Maxwell – during the 1st session
- James Collins – during the 2nd session

=== Speaker of the House of Representatives ===
- David Newland (D) – during both sessions

== Members ==
=== Members of the Council ===
Counties	Councillor	Session(s)		Party
Counties	Councillor	1st	2nd	Party
Brown, Fond du Lac, Manitowoc, Portage, & Sheboygan	Charles C. P. Arndt	✓	✓ (Note: Killed by James R. Vineyard on Feb. 11, 1842.)	Whig
Brown, Fond du Lac, Manitowoc, Portage, & Sheboygan	Morgan Lewis Martin	✓	✓	Dem.
Crawford & St. Croix	Charles J. Learned	✓	✓	
Dane, Dodge, Green, & Jefferson	Ebenezer Brigham	✓	✓	Whig
Grant	John H. Rountree	✓	✓	Whig
Grant	James R. Vineyard	✓	✓ (Note: Expelled Feb. 14, 1842, due to the murder of Charles C. P. Arndt.)	Dem.
Iowa	Levi Sterling	✓		Whig
Iowa	James Collins	✓	✓	Whig
Iowa	Moses M. Strong		✓	Dem.
Milwaukee & Washington	Jonathan E. Arnold	✓		
Milwaukee & Washington	Don A. J. Upham	✓	✓	Dem.
Milwaukee & Washington	John H. Tweedy		✓	Whig
Racine	William Bullen	✓	✓	
Racine	Lorenzo Janes	✓	✓	Dem.
Rock & Walworth	James Maxwell	✓	✓	

=== Members of the House of Representatives ===
Counties	Representative	Session(s)		Party
Counties	Representative	1st	2nd	Party
Brown, Fond du Lac, Manitowoc, Portage, & Sheboygan	William H. Bruce	✗ (Note: Lost contested seat.)		
Brown, Fond du Lac, Manitowoc, Portage, & Sheboygan	Albert G. Ellis	✓ (Note: Won contested seat.)	✓	Dem.
Brown, Fond du Lac, Manitowoc, Portage, & Sheboygan	Mason C. Darling	✓	✓	Dem.
Brown, Fond du Lac, Manitowoc, Portage, & Sheboygan	David Giddings	✓	✓	Whig
Crawford & St. Croix	Alfred Brunson	✗		Whig
Crawford & St. Croix	Theophilus La Chappelle	✓	✓	
Crawford & St. Croix	Joseph R. Brown	✓	✓	
Dane, Dodge, Green, & Jefferson	Lucius I. Barber	✓	✓	Whig
Dane, Dodge, Green, & Jefferson	Daniel S. Sutherland	✓	✓	
Grant	Daniel R. Burt	✓	✓	Whig
Grant	Nelson Dewey	✓	✓	Dem.
Grant	Neely Gray	✓	✓	Whig
Iowa	Francis J. Dunn	✓		
Iowa	Ephraim F. Ogden	✓	✓	
Iowa	Daniel M. Parkinson	✓	✓	Dem.
Iowa	David Newland	✓	✓	Dem.
Iowa	Thomas Jenkins		✓	Dem.
Milwaukee & Washington	Joseph Bond	✓	✓	Dem.
Milwaukee & Washington	Jacob Brazelton	✓	✓	
Milwaukee & Washington	Adam E. Ray	✓	✓	
Milwaukee & Washington	John S. Rockwell	✓	✓	
Milwaukee & Washington	William F. Shephard	✓	✓	
Racine	George Batchelder	✓	✓	Dem.
Racine	Thomas E. Parmelee	✓	✓	Dem.
Racine	Reuben H. Deming	✓	✓	Dem.
Rock & Walworth	John Hackett	✓	✓	Dem.
Rock & Walworth	Hugh Long	✓		Dem.
Rock & Walworth	Jesse C. Mills	✓	✓	Dem.
Rock & Walworth	Edward V. Whiton	✓	✓	Whig
Rock & Walworth	James Tripp		✓	

== Employees ==
=== Council employees ===
- Secretary:
  - George Beatty, both sessions
- Sergeant-at-Arms:
  - Miles M. Vineyard, 1st session
  - Ebenezer Childs, 2nd session
- Other notable staff:
  - John F. Potter, Transcribing Clerk, 2nd session

=== House employees ===
- Chief Clerk:
  - John Catlin, both sessions
- Sergeant-at-Arms:
  - Francis M. Rublee, 1st session
  - Thomas J. Moorman, 2nd session
