= 1848 United States Senate election in Wisconsin =

- June 8, 1848
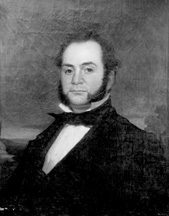

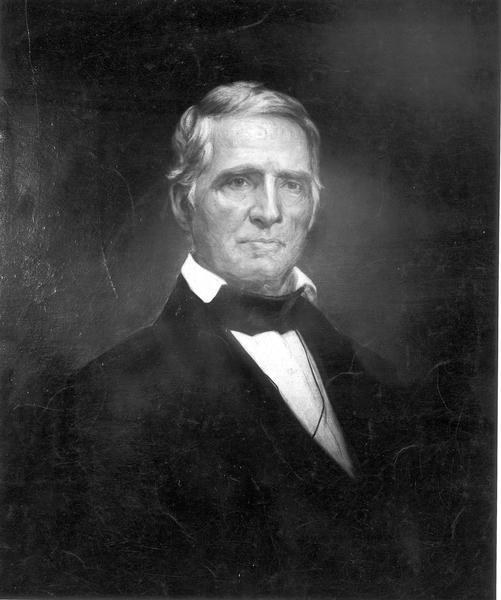

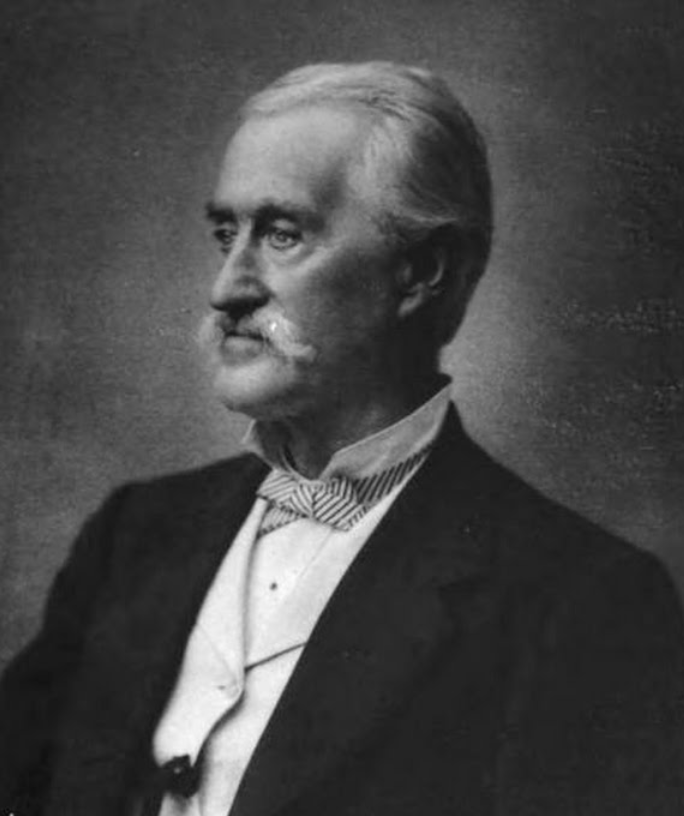

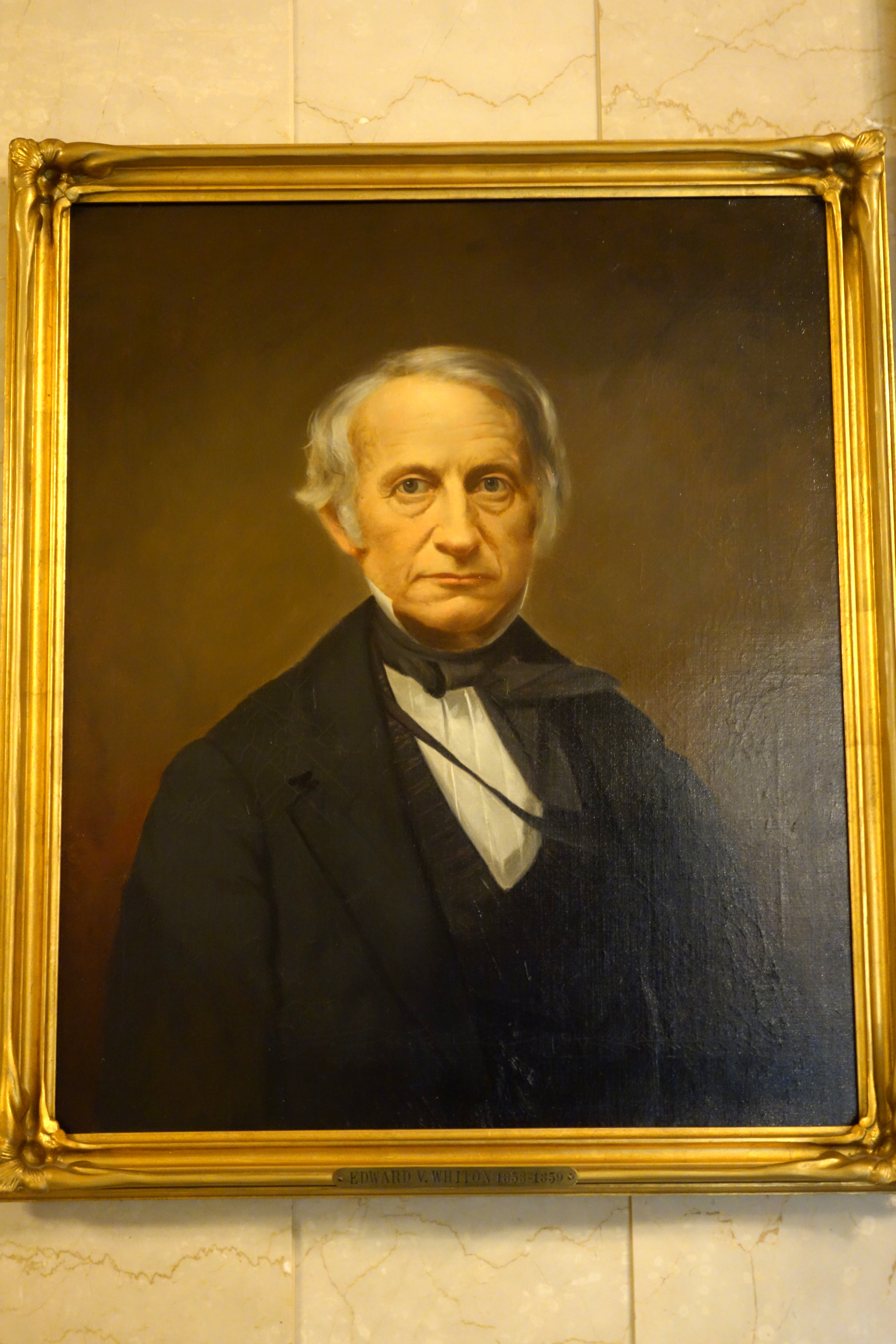
Nominee	Isaac P. Walker	Henry Dodge
Party	Democratic	Democratic
Legislative vote	61	60
Percentage	77.22%	75.95%
Nominee	Alexander L. Collins	Edward V. Whiton
Party	Whig	Whig
Legislative vote	18	17
Percentage	22.78%	21.52%
U.S. senators before election
None
Elected U.S. senators
Isaac P. Walker (Class 3)
Henry Dodge (Class 1)
Democratic

The 1848 United States Senate election in Wisconsin was held in the 1st Wisconsin Legislature on June 8, 1848. This was the first U.S. Senate election held in Wisconsin after it was admitted to the Union on May 29, 1848. Former Wisconsin Territory legislator Isaac P. Walker and former Wisconsin Territory governor Henry Dodge were elected to Wisconsin's Class 3 and Class 1 U.S. Senate seats, respectively, on a single ballot in which each Wisconsin legislator voted for two candidates.

In the 1848 legislative term, Democrats held large majorities in both chambers of the Wisconsin Legislature, so had more than enough votes to elect two Democratic United States senators.

== Major candidates ==
=== Democratic ===
- Isaac P. Walker, former speaker of the Wisconsin Territory House of Representatives.
- Henry Dodge, former governor of the Wisconsin Territory and former delegate to the U.S. House of Representatives from the Wisconsin Territory.

=== Whig ===
- Alexander L. Collins, village president of Madison, Wisconsin, and former member of the Wisconsin Territory Council.
- Edward V. Whiton, former speaker of the Wisconsin Territory House of Representatives, and former member of the Wisconsin Territory Council.

== Results ==
The 1st Wisconsin Legislature took one vote for U.S. senators on the fourth day of the legislative session, June 8, 1848. Each member was allowed to vote for two candidates, with 79 members voting, five absent, and one vacant seat.

1st Vote of the 1st Wisconsin Legislature, June 8, 1848 (top two)
Party	Candidate	Votes	%
Democratic	Isaac P. Walker	61 (Note: Walker received a vote from each Democratic member except senator Henry M. Billings and representatives James M. Campbell and Ezra Durgin (who were absent), and Archibald Nichols (who voted for the Whig nominees), he received one cross-over vote from Whig representative Jonathan Daugherty.)	77.22%
Democratic	Henry Dodge	60 (Note: Dodge received a vote from each Democratic member except senator Henry M. Billings and representatives James M. Campbell and Ezra Durgin (who were absent), and Archibald Nichols (who voted for the Whig nominees).)	75.95%
Whig	Alexander L. Collins	18 (Note: Collins received a vote from each Whig member except representatives William Caldwell and James Gilmore (who were absent), and Jonathan Daugherty (who voted for other candidates), he received one cross-over vote from Democratic representative Archibald Nichols.)	22.78%
Whig	Edward V. Whiton	17 (Note: Whiton received a vote from each Whig member except representatives William Caldwell and James Gilmore (who were absent), and Jonathan Daugherty and Charles Doty (who voted for other candidates), he received one cross-over vote from Democratic representative Archibald Nichols.)	21.52%
Whig	John Hubbard Tweedy	1 (Note: Tweedy received one vote from Whig representative Jonathan Daugherty.)	1.27%
Whig	William S. Hamilton	1 (Note: Hamilton received one vote from Whig representative Charles Doty.)	1.27%
	Absent	5	
Majority		40	50.63%
Total votes		79	92.94%
Democratic win (new seat)			
Democratic win (new seat)			
