= List of elections in 1861 =

The following elections occurred in the year 1861.

== Africa ==
=== Liberia ===
- 1861 Liberian general election
- 1861 Liberian constitutional referendum

== North America ==
=== Canada ===
- 1861 Newfoundland general election

=== Confederate States of America ===
- 1861 Confederate States presidential election

=== United States ===
- 1861 New York state election

==== United States Senate ====
- 1860 and 1861 United States Senate elections
- 1861 United States Senate election in California
- United States Senate election in New York, 1861
- 1861 United States Senate election in Pennsylvania
- 1861 United States Senate special election in Pennsylvania
- 1861 United States Senate election in Wisconsin

==== United States House of Representatives ====
- 1860 and 1861 United States House of Representatives elections

==== United States lieutenant gubernatorial ====
- 1861 California lieutenant gubernatorial election
- 1861 Connecticut lieutenant gubernatorial election
- 1861 Minnesota lieutenant gubernatorial election
- 1861 Wisconsin lieutenant gubernatorial election

==== United States gubernatorial ====
- 1861 California gubernatorial election
- 1861 Connecticut gubernatorial election
- 1861 Iowa gubernatorial election
- 1861 Maine gubernatorial election
- 1861 Maryland gubernatorial election
- 1861 Massachusetts gubernatorial election
- 1861 Minnesota gubernatorial election
- 1861 New Hampshire gubernatorial election
- 1861 Ohio gubernatorial election
- 1861 Rhode Island gubernatorial election
- 1861 Vermont gubernatorial election
- 1861 Wisconsin gubernatorial election

==== United States mayoral elections ====
- 1861 Boston mayoral election
- 1861 Chicago mayoral election
- 1861 Manchester, New Hampshire election
- 1861 New York City mayoral election

== South America ==
=== Chile ===
- 1861 Chilean parliamentary election
- 1861 Chilean presidential election

== Europe ==
- 1861 Belgian general election
- 1861 Danish Folketing election
- 1861 Faroese general election
- 1861 Greek parliamentary election
- 1861 Hungarian parliamentary election
- 1861 Italian general election
- 1861 Portuguese legislative election

=== Dalmatia ===
- 1861 Dalmatian parliamentary election

== Oceania ==
=== New Zealand ===
- 1860–1861 New Zealand general election

== See also ==
- Category:1861 elections
