= George F. Smith =

American politician

George F. Smith was an early Wisconsin Territory legislator from White Oak Springs who served in the first and second sessions (October 25, 1836 – December 9, 1836 and November 6, 1837 – January 20, 1838) of the 1st Wisconsin Territorial Legislature as a member of the House of Representatives (lower house) from Iowa County. He resigned after the second session, and was succeeded by James Collins (also from White Oak Springs) during the June 1838 special session.

At various times between 1845 and 1848, notifications were posted in local papers about efforts to collect debt(s) owed by Smith to one William Field, and several parcels of land in White Oak Springs and elsewhere in La Fayette County were sold in a sheriff's sale.

In a June 1877 newspaper article about pioneering legislators, he is listed as "included among the dead, on rumor which is possibly not well founded."
