= John Arndt =

John Arndt may refer to:

- John Arndt (basketball) (1928–2021), American assistant (1960–1961) and head coach (1961–1968) of men's basketball at Loyola Marymount University
- Johann Arndt (1555–1621), German Lutheran theologian
- John Penn Arndt (1780–1861), American merchant, pioneer, and legislator
