= 1861 Wisconsin lieutenant gubernatorial election =

- November 5, 1861
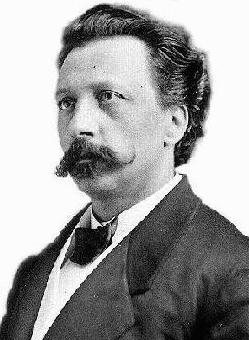

Nominee	Edward Salomon	Henry M. Billings	William C. Allen
Party	National Union	Democratic	Independent
Popular vote	49,605	44,114	5,131
Percentage	50.04%	44.50%	5.18%
Lieutenant Governor before election
Butler Noble
Republican
Elected Lieutenant Governor
Edward Salomon
Republican

The 1861 Wisconsin lieutenant gubernatorial election was held on November 5, 1861, in order to elect the lieutenant governor of Wisconsin. Republican nominee Edward Salomon defeated Democratic nominee and former member of the Wisconsin State Assembly Henry M. Billings and independent candidate and former county Judge of Walworth County, Wisconsin William C. Allen.

== General election ==
On election day, November 5, 1861, Republican nominee Edward Salomon won the election by a margin of 5,491 votes against his foremost opponent Democratic nominee Henry M. Billings, thereby retaining Republican control over the office of lieutenant governor. Salomon was sworn in as the 8th lieutenant governor of Wisconsin on January 6, 1862.

=== Results ===
Wisconsin lieutenant gubernatorial election, 1861
Party	Candidate	Votes	%
National Union	Edward Salomon	49,605	50.04
Democratic	Henry M. Billings	44,114	44.50
Independent	William C. Allen	5,131	5.18
	Scattering	275	0.28
Total votes		99,125	100.00
National Union hold			
