= Henry M. Billings =

American politician (1806–1862)

Member of the Wisconsin Senate from the 5th district
- In office June 5, 1848 – January 1, 1849
- Preceded by: Position established
- Succeeded by: Montgomery M. Cothren

Member of the Wisconsin State Assembly from the Iowa 1st district
- In office January 1, 1858 – January 1, 1859
- Preceded by: Ephraim Knowlton
- Succeeded by: Gardner C. Meigs

Member of the House of Representatives of the Wisconsin Territory from Iowa County
- In office November 26, 1838 – December 7, 1840 Serving with Russel Baldwin, John W. Blackstone, Thomas Jenkins, & Charles Bracken
- Preceded by: William Boyles, Daniel M. Parkinson, Thomas McKnight, Thomas Shanley, James P. Cox, & James Collins
- Succeeded by: Francis J. Dunn, Ephraim F. Ogden, Daniel M. Parkinson, & David Newland

Personal details
- Born: May 16, 1806 Schaghticoke, New York
- Died: February 6, 1862 (aged 55) Avoca, Wisconsin
- Cause of death: Accidental death
- Resting place: Calvary Cemetery, Cobb, Wisconsin
- Party: Democratic
- Spouse: Ann Bray (died 1906)
- Children: John Henry Billings^{(b. 1847; died 1932)}; William Noble Billings^{(b. 1852; died 1923)}; Frank Billings^{(b. 1854; died 1932)}; Mary Ella (Ferguson)^{(b. 1861; died 1938)}
- Occupation: Farmer

Henry Mortimer Billings (May 16, 1806 – February 6, 1862) was an American farmer and pioneer of the U.S. state of Wisconsin. He was a member of the first session of the Wisconsin State Senate and later served in the Wisconsin State Assembly, representing Iowa County.

== Biography ==
Born in Schaghticoke, New York, Billings moved to Galena, Illinois, in 1828 and then to Michigan Territory settling in Iowa County. In 1838, Billings served in the Wisconsin Territorial House of Representatives. In 1848, he served in the first session of the Wisconsin State Senate and later represented Iowa County in the Wisconsin State Assembly in 1858.

Billings was dragged to death in a sleigh accident near his home in Avoca. He is buried at Calvary Cemetery in Cobb.

== Electoral history ==
=== Wisconsin Lieutenant Governor (1861) ===
Wisconsin Lieutenant Gubernatorial Election, 1861
Party	Candidate	Votes	%	±%
General Election, November 5, 1861
Republican	Edward Salomon	49,605	50.04%	
Democratic	Henry M. Billings	44,114	44.50%	
National Union	William C. Allen	5,131	5.18%	
	Scattering	274	0.28%	
Plurality		5,491	5.54%	
Total votes		99,124	100.0%	
Republican hold				

Party political offices
Preceded by Alexander S. Palmer	Democratic nominee for Lieutenant Governor of Wisconsin; 1861	Succeeded by Nelson Dewey
Wisconsin State Assembly
Preceded by Ephraim Knowlton	Member of the Wisconsin State Assembly from the Iowa 1st district January 1, 1858 – January 1, 1859	Succeeded by Gardner C. Meigs
Wisconsin Senate
State government established	Member of the Wisconsin Senate from the 5th district June 5, 1848 – January 1, 1849	Succeeded by M. M. Cothren
