= William C. Allen (Wisconsin politician) =

19th century American politician

Member of the Wisconsin State Assembly from the Walworth 1st district
- In office January 1, 1866 – January 6, 1868
- Preceded by: Hezekiah C. Tilton
- Succeeded by: Joseph F. Lyon

County Judge of Walworth County, Wisconsin
- In office January 1, 1850 – February 1856
- Preceded by: Wyman Spooner
- Succeeded by: John F. Potter
- In office December 1842 – December 1846
- Preceded by: John F. Potter
- Succeeded by: Wyman Spooner

Personal details
- Born: February 2, 1814 Hoosick, New York, U.S.
- Died: January 12, 1887 (aged 72) Racine, Wisconsin, U.S.
- Resting place: Spring Grove Cemetery, Delavan, Wisconsin
- Party: Independent; Democratic (1876); Liberal Republican (1872); Natl. Union (1861–1867)
- Spouse: Mary A. McConkey (m. 1840–1887)
- Children: none
- Education: Read law
- Profession: Lawyer, banker

William Cheney Allen (February 2, 1814 – January 12, 1887) was an American lawyer, businessman, and Wisconsin pioneer. He was one of the earliest American settlers at what is now Delavan, Wisconsin, and represented that area of Walworth County as a member of the Wisconsin State Assembly during the 1866 and 1867 sessions. He was also the county judge of Walworth County for 10 years in the 1840s and 1850s.

== Early life and education ==
William C. Allen was born in Hoosick, in Rensselaer County, New York, in February 1814. He was raised and worked on his father's farm until age 16, but then had to look for work to raise funds for his own education. He went to work as a farm hand for a neighbor named "Wheeler", and was also invited to study in the extensive library of his well-educated neighbor. He continued to work in the Summer months for Wheeler, utilizing his library, and attended select school courses in the Fall and Winter months. He then attended an academy in Jefferson, New York, for two and a half years.

He originally planned to attend Union College, but chose instead to study law in the office of attorney Cornelius H. Putnam in Montgomery County, New York. He studied under Putnam for four years, and was admitted to the New York state bar in 1840. The next year, he left New York and went west to the Wisconsin Territory.

== Delavan pioneer ==
He settled in the town of Delavan in Walworth County, where he would remain for most of the rest of his life. At the time, there were just a few rudimentary houses in the entire town. He was first elected county judge in 1842, when still under the Wisconsin Territory government, and served three two-year terms. He returned to office with the Fall election of 1849, and was re-elected again in 1853.

In the meantime, he had become involved in several business ventures in the region. He was one of the founders of the Walworth County Bank in 1850, and remained associated with the bank until its dissolution and re-incorporation under the new banking law in 1863. He was also one of the incorporators of the "Western Union Railroad" also known as the "Racine, Janesville, and Mississippi Railroad". He resigned his judicial office in 1856 with nearly two years left in his term in order to devote all of his energy to the construction of the railroad. The railroad suffered from debt problems and after partially completing the original plan, was turned over to the Chicago, Milwaukee & St. Paul Railroad.

In the Winter of 1849, he was appointed to a special commission to construct the first compilation of the statutes of Wisconsin. When the first Wisconsin institution for the education of the deaf and dumb was established in 1852, Allen was appointed to the board of trustees, and served on the board until 1871.

During the American Civil War, Allen was associated with the National Union Party. By some confusion, his name was circulated in some counties as the Union nominee for Lieutenant Governor of Wisconsin in 1861 and he received about 5% of the votes for that office. Politically, Allen was described as an independent. He was an abolitionist, an advocate for free trade, an opponent of fiat money or silver-backed paper money, and a supporter of the temperance movement. He supported Abraham Lincoln, then Horace Greeley's Liberal Republicans in 1872, then Samuel Tilden in his Democratic campaign for the presidency in 1876.

He was elected to the Wisconsin State Assembly in 1865 and 1866, representing the southwest quadrant of Walworth County. He served as chairman of the committee on railroads during the 19th Wisconsin Legislature, and then chairman of the committee on federal relations during the 20th Wisconsin Legislature.

== Later years ==
He moved to Racine, Wisconsin, in 1870 and opened a law office there, and was elected city attorney shortly after his arrival. He continued his business interests in Racine, and was one of the founders of the Manufacturers' National Bank at Racine, in partnership with Jerome Case. In 1871, the Legislature voted to organize a state Board of Charities and Reform to centralize some of the management of the state's charitable hospitals and institutions. Allen was one of the first commissioners appointed to the board, beginning his service in April 1871. He served for three years, but was forced to resign in 1874 due to poor health.

He largely retired from public life at this time, though remained involved in the board of the bank until his death. He died at his home in Racine on January 12, 1887.

== Personal life and family ==
William C. Allen was a son of Jacob and Lucy (née Cheney) Allen. Both parents were of English ancestry. His paternal grandfather, Samuel Allen, was a soldier in the New Hampshire militia during the American Revolutionary War. His father's financial problems after some failed speculation led to Allen striking out on his own and seeking work as a young man.

William C. Allen married Mary A. McConkey on October 7, 1840. She was a daughter of John McConkey of Voorheesville, New York. They had no children.

== Electoral history ==
=== Wisconsin Lieutenant Governor (1861) ===
Wisconsin Lieutenant Gubernatorial Election, 1861
Party	Candidate	Votes	%	±%
General Election, November 5, 1861
Republican	Edward Salomon	49,605	50.04%	
Democratic	Henry M. Billings	44,114	44.50%	
National Union	William C. Allen	5,131	5.18%	
	Scattering	274	0.28%	
Plurality		5,491	5.54%	
Total votes		99,124	100.0%	
Republican hold				

Wisconsin State Assembly
Preceded by Hezekiah C. Tilton	Member of the Wisconsin State Assembly from the Walworth 1st district January 1, 1866 – January 6, 1868	Succeeded by Joseph F. Lyon
Legal offices
Preceded by John F. Potter	County Judge of Walworth County, Wisconsin; December 1842 – December 1846	Succeeded by Wyman Spooner
Preceded by Wyman Spooner	County Judge of Walworth County, Wisconsin; January 1, 1850 – February 1856	Succeeded by John F. Potter
