= John Wilford Blackstone Jr. =

American politician and judge (1835-1911)

The Honorable John W. Blackstone Jr.
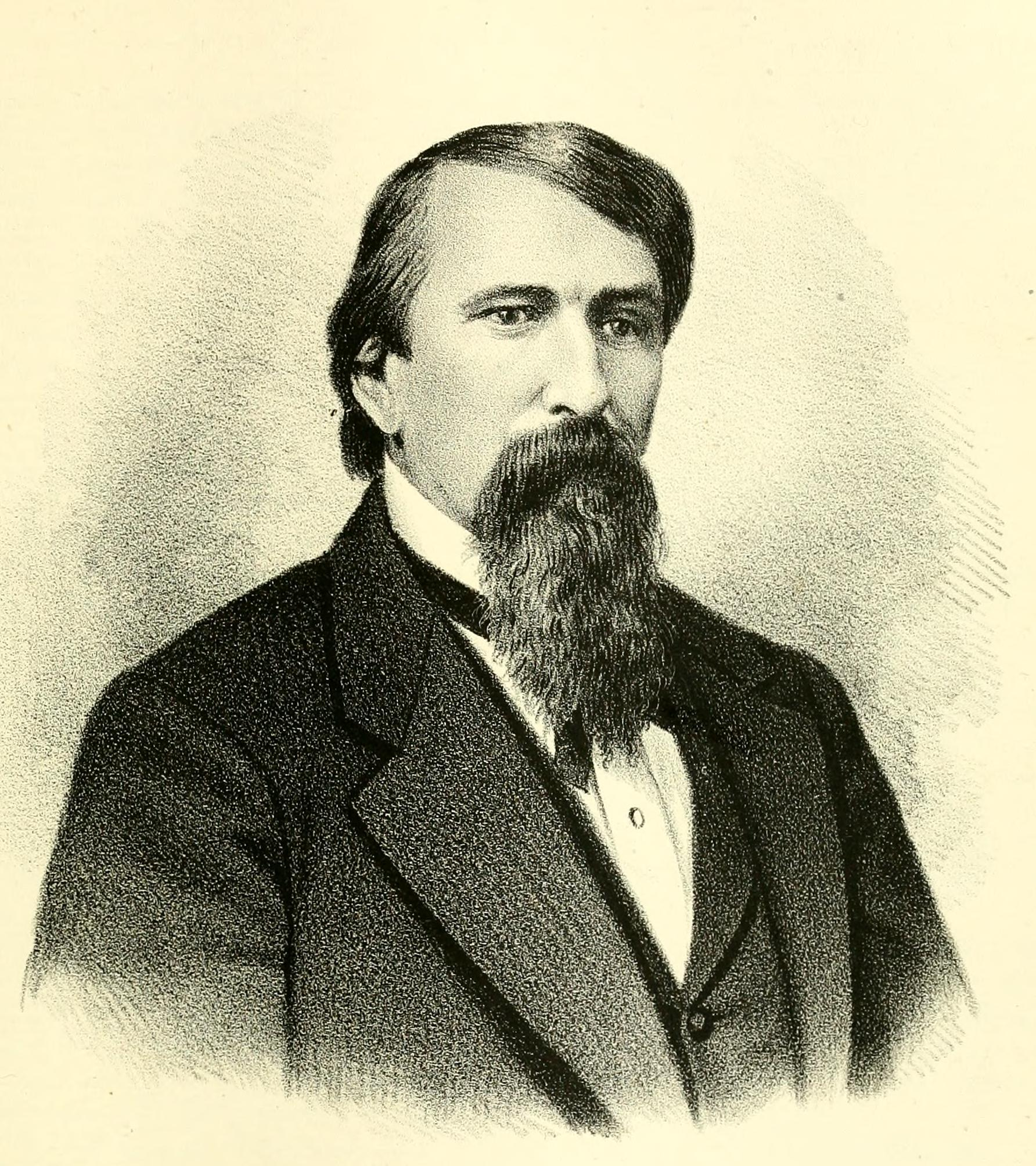

Member of the Wisconsin Senate from the 12th district
- In office January 1, 1880 – January 1, 1882
- Preceded by: Joseph B. Treat
- Succeeded by: Archibald N. Randall

Member of the Wisconsin State Assembly from the Lafayette 2nd district
- In office January 1, 1879 – January 1, 1880
- Preceded by: Bernard McGinty
- Succeeded by: Bernard McGinty

District Attorney of Lafayette County
- In office January 1, 1873 – December 31, 1874
- Preceded by: Joseph H. Clary
- Succeeded by: James R. Rose

County Judge of Lafayette County
- In office January 1, 1862 – December 31, 1869
- Preceded by: L. P. Higbee
- Succeeded by: Philo A. Orton Jr.

Personal details
- Born: December 22, 1835 White Oak Springs, Michigan Territory
- Died: October 22, 1911 (aged 75) Minneapolis, Minnesota, U.S.
- Resting place: Evergreen Cemetery; Shullsburg, Wisconsin
- Party: Republican
- Spouse: Ellen E. Hardy (m. 1861)
- Children: Roccey (Prince); Jessie Edna Blackstone^{(b. 1867; died 1931)}; John Wilford Blackstone III; Ralph Hardy Blackstone^{(b. 1880; died 1956)}
- Parents: John Wilford Blackstone (father); Catherine (Tomlinson) Blackstone (mother)
- Education: Beloit College; Brown University
- Profession: lawyer, judge

John Wilford Blackstone Jr. (December 22, 1835 – October 22, 1911) was an American farmer, lawyer, judge, Republican politician, and Wisconsin pioneer. He served two years in the Wisconsin Senate and one year in the Wisconsin State Assembly, representing Lafayette County. He also served eight years as county judge and two years as district attorney for Lafayette County.

Blackstone was among the first generation of American children born in the area that is now the state of Wisconsin. His father, John Wilford Blackstone Sr., came to the territory in 1828; he was one of the first lawyers residing there, and served in the Wisconsin Territory legislature.

== Biography ==
Born in White Oak Springs (then part of the Michigan Territory) Blackstone read law with John K. Williams and was admitted to the State Bar of Wisconsin in 1861. He was elected County Judge in Lafayette County that year, commencing his term in January 1862. He served two terms before losing re-election in 1868. In 1873, he returned to office as District Attorney.

He served in the Wisconsin State Assembly in the 1879 session and in the Wisconsin State Senate for the 1880 and 1881 sessions. He also worked as an agent of the Bureau of Pensions for three years. Later in life, he moved to Minneapolis, Minnesota, where his daughter, Roccey, resided. He died there in 1911.

== Personal life and family ==
Blackstone is a direct descendant of William Blaxton (Blackstone), one of the first colonists of the Plymouth Colony, and the first English resident at Boston (1623) and Rhode Island (1635). The name "Blackstone" appears on many landmarks of New England due to his noteworthy ancestor.

His father was John Wilford Blackstone Sr. one of the early pioneers of Lafayette County, who served in the Wisconsin Territorial Legislature and was a judge for Iowa County during the time it was organized under the Michigan Territory.

John W. Blackstone Jr. married Ellen E. Hardy, of Platteville, Wisconsin, on June 20, 1862. They had at least four children:

- Roccey, who married and moved to Minneapolis
- Jessie, who became principal of the Prescott School in Anaconda, Montana
- John III, who became editor and publisher of the Southwestern Local in Shullsburg
- Ralph, who became a freight conductor on the Chicago, Milwaukee, and St. Paul Railroad

Wisconsin State Assembly
Preceded by Bernard McGinty	Member of the Wisconsin State Assembly from the Lafayette 2nd district January 1, 1879 – January 1, 1880	Succeeded by Bernard McGinty
Wisconsin Senate
Preceded by Joseph B. Treat	Member of the Wisconsin Senate from the 12th district January 1, 1880 – January 1, 1882	Succeeded by Archibald N. Randall
Legal offices
Preceded by L. P. Higbee	County Judge of Lafayette County, Wisconsin; January 1, 1862 – December 31, 1869	Succeeded by Philo A. Orton, Jr.
Preceded by Joseph H. Clary	District Attorney of Lafayette County, Wisconsin; January 1, 1873 – December 31, 1874	Succeeded by James R. Rose
