= John Penn Arndt =

19th century American merchant, Wisconsin pioneer

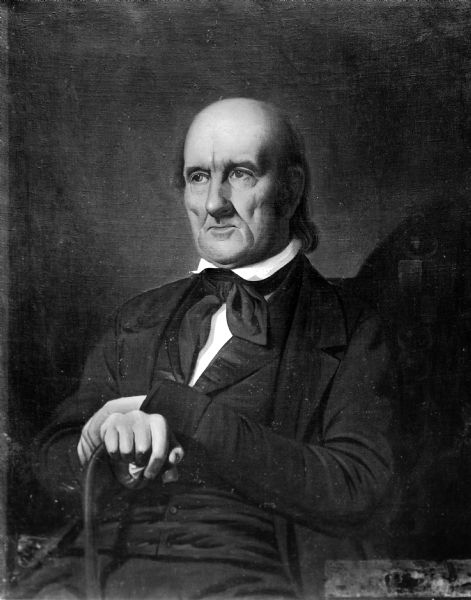
- Portrait by Samuel Marsden Brookes, ca.1856

Chairman of the Board of Supervisors of Brown County, Wisconsin
- In office April 1856 – April 1857
- Preceded by: Daniel W. King
- Succeeded by: Lorenzo Brown
- In office April 1853 – April 1854
- Preceded by: Johnathan Wheelock
- Succeeded by: Johnathan Wheelock

County Judge of Brown County, Wisconsin
- In office September 1848 – September 1849
- Preceded by: John Last
- Succeeded by: David Agry
- In office April 30, 1842 – August 7, 1843
- Preceded by: Charles C. P. Arndt
- Succeeded by: Charles Chapman

Member of the Council of the Wisconsin Territory for Brown County
- In office October 25, 1836 – November 5, 1838 Serving with Henry S. Baird (1836) & Alexander J. Irwin (1837–1838)
- Preceded by: Position established
- Succeeded by: Alexander J. Irwin & Morgan Lewis Martin

Personal details
- Born: November 25, 1780 Bucks County, Pennsylvania
- Died: June 10, 1861 (aged 80) Green Bay, Wisconsin, U.S.
- Resting place: Woodlawn Cemetery, Allouez, Wisconsin
- Party: Republican; Whig (before 1854)
- Spouse: Elizabeth Carpenter (m. 1803; died 1860)
- Children: Philip Arndt^{(b. 1804; died 1817)}; Alexander Hamilton Arndt^{(b. 1805; died 1847)}; Baltus Arndt^{(died in infancy)}; Mary Budleman (Cotton)^{(b. 1809; died 1896)}; Charles Cotesworth Pinckney Arndt^{(b. 1811; died 1842)}; John Wallace Arndt^{(b. 1815; died 1897)}; Elizabeth Margaret (Eastman)^{(b. 1822; died 1908)}
- Occupation: Merchant, shipbuilder

John Penn Arndt (November 25, 1780 – June 10, 1861) was an American merchant, shipbuilder, and Wisconsin pioneer. He was an early settler at what is now Green Bay, Wisconsin, and served in the 1st Wisconsin Territorial Assembly. He was responsible for the first dam on the Fox River and for building some of Wisconsin's first sailing ships. His son Charles was killed during a session of the Wisconsin Territorial Council in 1842.

== Early life and career ==
John Penn Arndt was born in Durham Township, Bucks County, Pennsylvania, in November 1780. His mother died at the time of his birth, and so he went to live on his grandparents' estate in Williams Township, Northampton County, Pennsylvania, and was largely raised by his uncle, Jacob Arndt. At age 18, he went to work with his father at Wilkes-Barre, Pennsylvania, in milling, lumbering, and merchandising, including the construction of Durham boats intended for transportation on the Susquehanna River.

After his father's death in 1804, Arndt took full control of the business and ran it successfully until the financial crisis after the conclusion of the War of 1812. He ultimately had to sell most of the property he had accumulated through his business.

After that setback, he began seeking new opportunities and went with a friend to survey western Pennsylvania, New York, Ohio, Indiana, and the Michigan Territory. He returned and settled briefly in Buffalo, New York, in 1819, before moving to Mackinac Island, Michigan Territory, in 1822. On Mackinac Island, he engaged in the fur trade, buying and shipping fish and furs from the frontier to New England markets. He came to own and operate two ships for carrying his cargo, but his business ultimately ran afoul of the powerful American Fur Company, and he was forced to relocate again. He moved west in 1824 to what is now Green Bay, Wisconsin.

== Wisconsin career ==
Arriving in Green Bay, Arndt built a home from timber, which would be his primary residence for the rest of his life. He later improved the home with bricks, becoming the first person to burn bricks on the Wisconsin Territory. Through his business interests, he was also important in several early commercial developments in neighboring regions along the coast of the Green Bay and the Fox River. In 1825 he began producing Durham boats similar to those of his former Wilkes-Barre business for navigation on the Fox River and was authorized to operate a ferry across the Fox River. That same year, he received the first authorization to operate a tavern in what is now the state of Wisconsin. Ironically, he later became one of the organizers of the first Temperance society in Wisconsin.

While building his boats, he found it difficult to procure the right type of lumber, which led him to establish his own mill in 1827. It was located in what is now Oconto County, Wisconsin. At the time, the area was still Menominee territory and required special permission from the United States War Department. His lumber interest in Menominee territory made him an important participant in the 1827 treaty negotiations at Lake Butte des Morts, as his boats transported all of the American delegates and his lumber supplies were used for the construction of all of the site facilities. The negotiation ultimately saw the Menominee cede all the land east of the Wisconsin River, which included the land where Arndt's saw mill was operating.

His lumbering enabled him to be at the forefront of the shipbuilding industry in Wisconsin, making him the first to build a scow and the first to build a schooner on the Wisconsin Territory. His first schooner he named Wisconsin, and the second he named Mary Elizabeth after his two daughters. He was also a founder of the Fox River Hydraulic Company in 1835, which established one of the first dams on the Fox River, at De Pere, Wisconsin.

In 1836, the Wisconsin Territory was formally established from what was left of the Michigan Territory after the creation of the state of Michigan. At the first election of the Wisconsin Territory, running on the Whig Party ticket, Arndt was elected as one of two representatives of Brown County on the Council of the Wisconsin Territory (the upper chamber of the territorial legislature). He served in all of the sessions of the 1st Wisconsin Territorial Assembly. He also later served two one year stints as probate judge of Brown County, succeeding his son after his death in 1842, and serving again from September 1848 to September 1849. Later, he also served several local offices in Green Bay and Brown County, and was chairman of the county board in 1853 and 1856.

He became a member of the Republican Party when it was established in 1854. He was the Republican Party nominee for Wisconsin Senate in the 2nd State Senate district in 1857, but lost to Democrat Morgan Lewis Martin.

== Personal life and family ==
John Penn Arndt was the only known child of Philip Arndt and his wife Mary (née Little). Philip Arndt served in the Pennsylvania Militia for much of the American Revolutionary War, rising from an enlistment to become a lieutenant. The Arndts were descended from Bernhard Arndt, an early settler of the Province of Pennsylvania.

John Penn Arndt married Elizabeth Carpenter at Warren County, New Jersey, on March 7, 1803. They had seven children together, though one died in infancy and another died in childhood.

- Their eldest son, Philip, drowned in the Susquehanna River at age 13 while trying to catch driftwood.
- Their second son, Alexander Hamilton Arndt, served in the Mexican–American War and died of Yellow fever while serving in Texas.
- Their fourth son, Charles C. P. Arndt, was a promising young lawyer and politician. He was elected to the Council of the Wisconsin Territory, but was shot and killed in the Council chamber by fellow councilmember James Russell Vineyard after a dispute over a gubernatorial appointee.
- Their youngest child, Elizabeth Margaret Arndt, married H. E. Eastman, another prominent early Wisconsin settler who became the 3rd mayor of Green Bay.

John Penn Arndt died June 10, 1861, at his home in Green Bay, Wisconsin.

Political offices
Preceded by Johnathan Wheelock	Chairman of the Board of Supervisors of Brown County, Wisconsin	Succeeded by Johnathan Wheelock
Preceded by Daniel W. King	Chairman of the Board of Supervisors of Brown County, Wisconsin	Succeeded by Lorenzo Brown
Legal offices
Preceded by Charles C. P. Arndt	County Judge of Brown County, Wisconsin	Succeeded by Charles Chapman
Preceded by John Last	County Judge of Brown County, Wisconsin	Succeeded by David Agry
