= Marshall Strong =

American lawyer and politician, Wisconsin pioneer (1813–1864)

Marshall M. Strong

Member of the Wisconsin State Assembly from the Racine 1st district
- In office January 10, 1849 – January 9, 1850
- Preceded by: David McDonald
- Succeeded by: Horace Chapman

President of the Council of the Wisconsin Territory
- In office December 4, 1843 – January 6, 1845
- Preceded by: Moses M. Strong
- Succeeded by: Moses M. Strong

Member of the Council of the Wisconsin Territory from Racine County
- In office December 4, 1843 – October 18, 1847 Serving with: Michael Frank (1843-1846); Frederick S. Lovell (1847)
- Preceded by: Consider Heath; Peter D. Hugunin
- Succeeded by: Philo White
- In office November 26, 1838 – December 2, 1839 Serving with William Bullen
- Preceded by: Position Established
- Succeeded by: Lorenzo Janes

Personal details
- Born: Marshall Mason Strong; September 3, 1813 Amherst, Massachusetts
- Died: March 9, 1864 (aged 50)
- Resting place: Mound Cemetery; Racine, Wisconsin
- Party: Free Soil
- Relations: Simeon Strong (grandfather); Henry W. Strong (brother)
- Parent: Hezekiah W. Strong (father)

Marshall Mason Strong (September 3, 1813 – March 9, 1864) was an American lawyer, newspaper editor, businessman, and politician from Racine, Wisconsin who served on the Wisconsin Territorial Council (the predecessor of the Wisconsin State Senate) of the Wisconsin Territorial Legislature in 1838–1839 and 1844–1847 from Racine County, including a term as President of the council. He later spent a single one-year term in 1849 as a Free Soil Party member of the Wisconsin State Assembly from that county. In 1852, he unsuccessfully ran for an associate judgeship on the Supreme Court of Wisconsin.

== Background ==
Strong was born in Amherst, Massachusetts, on September 3, 1813. His first American ancestor, Elder John Strong, had come to Dorchester, Massachusetts in 1630 from England, and the next five generations in the Strong lineage remained in that state. His father was Hezekiah Wright Strong, a lawyer and the son of Simeon Strong (a Justice of the Supreme Court of Massachusetts). Marshall Strong spent two years at Amherst College from 1830 to 1832. In late 1832, his father had moved to Troy, New York; Marshall entered Union College in nearby Schenectady, New York, and studied there for an unknown period. He later read the law in Troy, and was admitted to the bar there.

== Newspaper and territorial government ==
In 1838 he and Lorenzo Janes were among those who combined to found the newspaper the Racine Argus, the first newspaper in Racine County; and he and Janes served as its first editors. Strong was one of the first pair of Councillors from Racine County in 1838–1839. When the Legislature in its 1838 session passed a law incorporating a "University of the Territory of Wisconsin", Strong was among those who were appointed to its Board of Visitors; however, this body (the predecessor of the U.W. board of regents) never actually accomplished anything before statehood.

He resigned from the Council in 1839, and Janes was elected to succeed him.

He served again from 1843 to 1847, serving as President of the council from December 5, 1843, to January 6, 1845. He was a delegate to the 1st Wisconsin Constitutional Convention, but resigned from that body and acted as a leader of the successful movement to reject the ratification of the Constitution it had drafted, one he considered too radical in its provisions.

== Railroad work ==
When the Racine, Janesville and Mississippi Railroad Company, later the Racine and Mississippi Rail Road Company) was incorporated by the legislature April 17, 1852, Strong was one of the incorporators. From 1854 to 1856 he was the corporation's attorney. This line was later merged into the Western Union Railroad Company.

== Electoral history ==
=== Wisconsin Supreme Court (1852) ===
1852 Wisconsin Supreme Court election
Party	Candidate	Votes	%	±%
General Election, September 1852
Democratic	Abram D. Smith	10,837	51.00%	
Independent	Marshall Strong	10,410	49.00%	
Plurality		427	2.01%	
Total votes		21,247	100.0%	
Democratic win (new seat)				
