= White Oak Springs, Wisconsin =

- Town
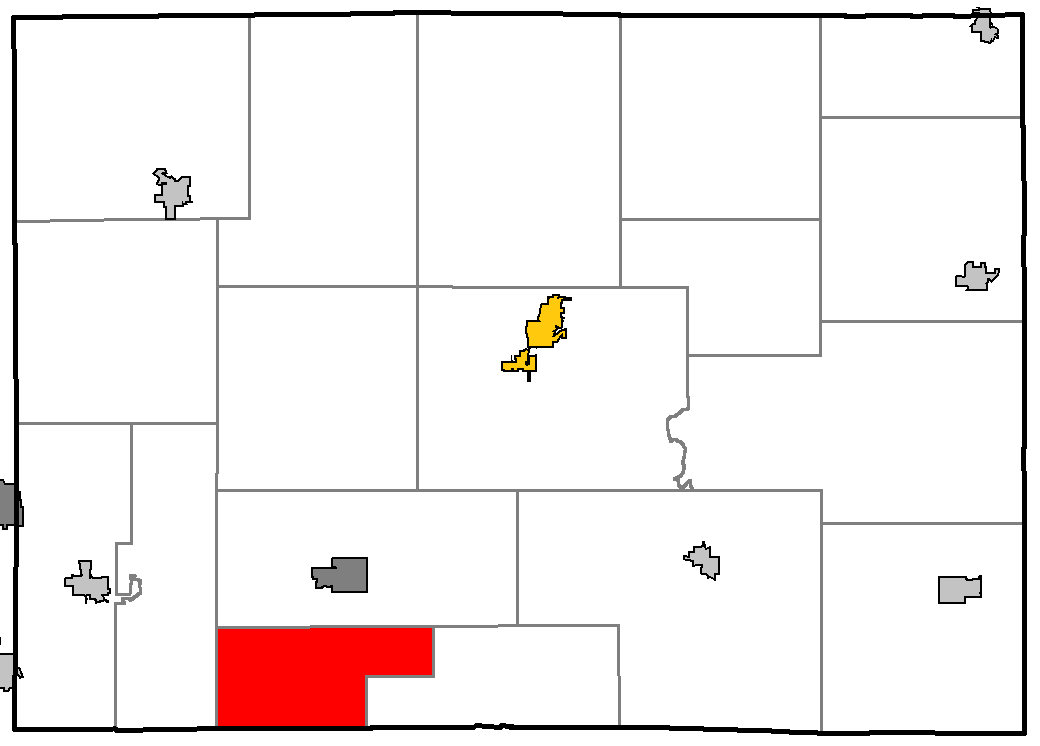
- Location of White Oak Springs, within Lafayette County, Wisconsin

- Location of Lafayette County, Wisconsin
- Coordinates: 42°32′11″N 90°16′10″W
- Country: United States
- State: Wisconsin
- County: Lafayette

Area
  - Total: 16.54 sq mi (42.83 km^{2})
  - Land: 16.54 sq mi (42.83 km^{2})
  - Water: 0 sq mi (0.0 km^{2})
- Elevation: 1,122 ft (342 m)

Population (2020)
  - Total: 109
  - Density: 6.59/sq mi (2.54/km^{2})
- Time zone: UTC-6 (Central (CST))
  - Summer (DST): UTC-5 (CDT)
- ZIP Code: 53586 (Shullsburg)
- Area code: 608
- FIPS code: 55-86800
- GNIS feature ID: 1584429

White Oak Springs is a town in Lafayette County, Wisconsin, United States. The population was 109 at the 2020 census, down from 118 at the 2010 census. The unincorporated community of White Oak is located in the town.

== Geography ==
White Oak Springs is in southwestern Lafayette County, with its southern border the Illinois state line. According to the United States Census Bureau, the town has a total area of 16.5 square miles (42.8 km^{2}), all land.

== Demographics ==
Historical population
Census	Pop.	Note	%±
2000	97		—
2010	118		21.6%
2020	109		−7.6%

As of the census of 2000, there were 97 people, 35 households, and 24 families residing in the town. The population density was 5.9 people per square mile (2.3/km^{2}). There were 39 housing units at an average density of 2.4 per square mile (0.9/km^{2}). The racial makeup of the town was 97.94% White, and 2.06% from two or more races.

There were 35 households, out of which 40.0% had children under the age of 18 living with them, 62.9% were married couples living together, 2.9% had a female householder with no husband present, and 28.6% were non-families. 22.9% of all households were made up of individuals, and 8.6% had someone living alone who was 65 years of age or older. The average household size was 2.77 and the average family size was 3.32.

In the town, the population was spread out, with 29.9% under the age of 18, 10.3% from 18 to 24, 25.8% from 25 to 44, 25.8% from 45 to 64, and 8.2% who were 65 years of age or older. The median age was 33 years. For every 100 females, there were 106.4 males. For every 100 females age 18 and over, there were 106.1 males.

The median income for a household in the town was $41,000, and the median income for a family was $41,500. Males had a median income of $26,875 versus $20,625 for females. The per capita income for the town was $14,362. There were 7.9% of families and 4.5% of the population living below the poverty line, including no under eighteens and 25.0% of those over 64.

== Notable people ==
- John Wilford Blackstone Sr., lawyer, Wisconsin territorial legislator
- John Wilford Blackstone Jr., lawyer, Wisconsin state legislator
- James Collins, Wisconsin territorial legislator
- Thomas Cox, surveyor and politician
- George F. Smith, Wisconsin territorial legislator
- Joshua White, businessman, Illinois state legislator
