= Robert Irwin Jr. =

American politician (1797–1833)

Robert Irwin Jr. (December 24, 1797 – July 9, 1833) was an American pioneer and territorial legislator.

Robert Irwin was born in Greensburg, Pennsylvania on December 24, 1797. Irwin moved with his family to Detroit, Michigan, in 1816. Then in 1817, he moved to Green Bay, Michigan Territory and was in the mercantile business with his brother Alexander J. Irwin, who served in the Wisconsin Territorial Legislature. He was also justice of the peace and postmaster. From 1823 to 1830, Irwin served in the Michigan Territorial Council from Brown County, Michigan Territory. In 1832, he served in the United States Army in the Black Hawk War. He fell ill with bilious fever in September 1832 and never fully recovered. Irwin was appointed United States Indian Agent for Fort Winnebago and died there on July 9, 1833. His body was taken to Fort Howard, where he was buried on July 11, 1833.
