= 1883 Tehachapi train wreck =

1883 railroad accident in California

- Depiction of the accident in the Frank Leslie's Illustrated Newspaper (February 1883)

Details
- Date: January 20, 1883; 12:00 PM
- Location: Tehachapi, California
- Country: United States
- Operator: Southern Pacific Railroad
- Incident type: Derailment of a runaway train, fire
- Cause: Air brakes were released, suspected robbery

Statistics
- Deaths: 15
- Injured: 12

The Tehachapi train wreck occurred on January 20, 1883, near Tehachapi, California, when a runaway train rolled down a slope into a curve and derailed. The accident resulted in the deaths of 15 people, including former Wisconsin congressman Charles H. Larrabee and Maria Guirado, the wife of the former California Governor John G. Downey. Governor Downey was also injured in the wreck.

== Incident ==
On January 20, 1883, a 4-8-0 steam locomotive had just climbed a steep peak in Tehachapi, California. However, when the train was left unattended, it became a runaway and derailed along the same track that it had previously climbed. Both sleeper cars, an express car, and the mail and baggage coaches derailed and ignited a fire. Fifteen were killed. Investigation into the incident revealed that two strangers had boarded the train. It is believed that these two men were robbers that had lost control of the train and would also die in the disaster.
