= 1852 Wisconsin Supreme Court elections =

- September 1852

The inaugural elections for the Wisconsin Supreme Court was held in September 1852, with the court's original three judgeships (a chief justice two associate justice seats) being filled.

== Chief justice election ==
1852 Wisconsin Supreme Court elections
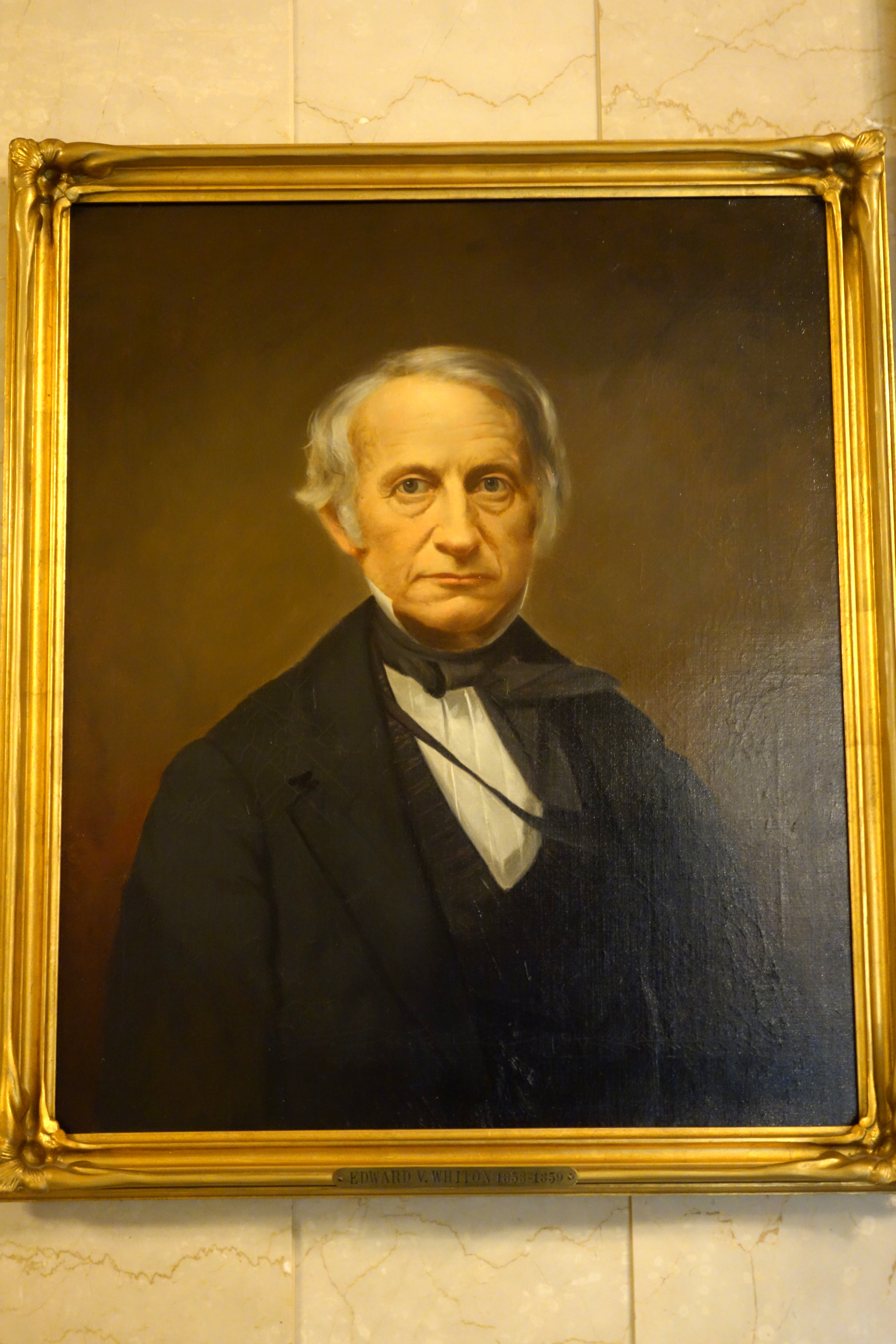

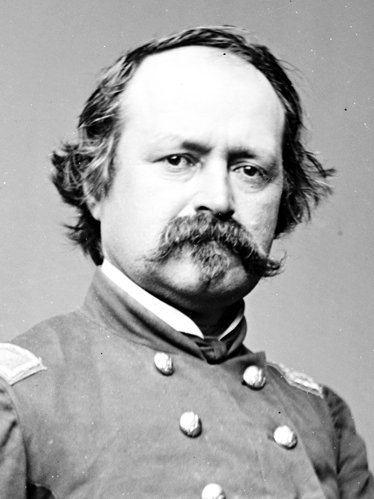
Candidate	Edward V. Whiton	Charles H. Larrabee
Party	Independent	Democratic
Popular vote	10,520	9,806
Percentage	53.48%	45.40%
Elected Chief Justice
Edward V. Whiton
Independent

Chief Justice election
Party	Candidate	Votes	%
General Election, September 1852
Independent	Edward V. Whiton	11,792	54.60
Democratic	Charles H. Larrabee	9,806	45.40
Plurality		1,986	9.20
Total votes		21,598	100
Independent win (new seat)			

== Associate justice election won by Crawford ==
1852 Wisconsin Supreme Court elections
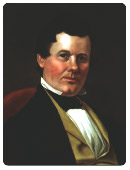

Candidate	Samuel Crawford	Wiram Knowlton
Party	Democratic	Independent
Popular vote	10,520	9,151
Percentage	53.48%	46.52%
Elected Justice
Samuel Crawford
Democratic

Result
Party	Candidate	Votes	%
General Election, September 1852
Democratic	Samuel Crawford	10,520	53.48
Independent	Wiram Knowlton	9,151	46.52
Plurality		1,369	6.96
Total votes		19,671	100
Democratic win (new seat)			

== Associate justice election won by Smith ==
1852 Wisconsin Supreme Court elections
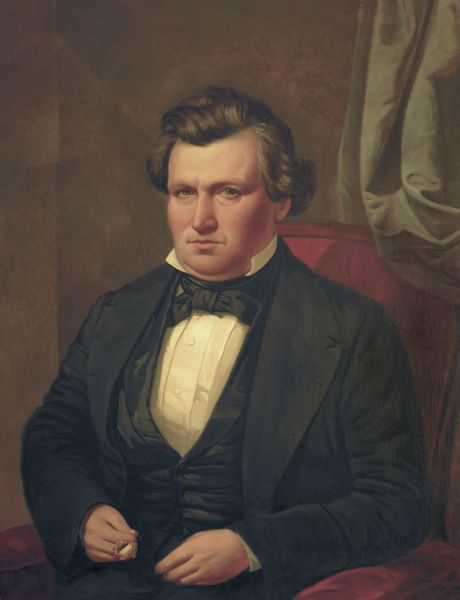

Candidate	Abram D. Smith	Marshall Strong
Party	Democratic	Independent
Popular vote	10,837	10,410
Percentage	51.00%	49.00%
Elected Justice
Abram D. Smith
Democratic

Result
Party	Candidate	Votes	%
General Election, September 1852
Democratic	Abram D. Smith	10,837	51.00
Independent	Marshall Strong	10,410	49.00
Plurality		427	2.01
Total votes		21,247	100
Democratic win (new seat)			
