= Charles C. P. Arndt =

19th-century American politician

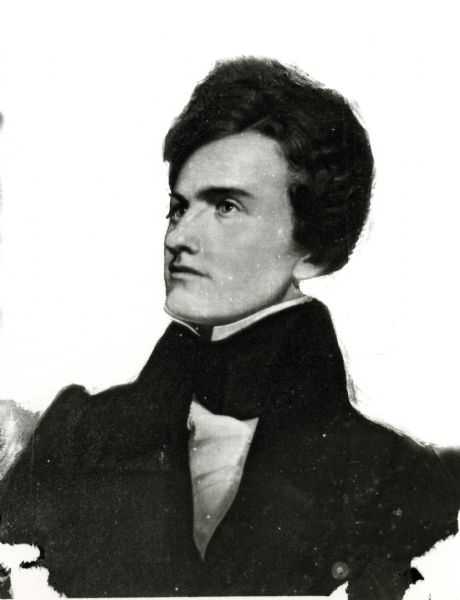
- Portrait by Thomas D. Bowring, DePere, Wisconsin

Member of the Council of the Wisconsin Territory for Brown, Fond du Lac, Manitowoc, Portage, & Sheboygan counties
- In office December 2, 1839 – February 11, 1842 Serving with Morgan Lewis Martin
- Preceded by: Alexander J. Irwin
- Succeeded by: Morgan Lewis Martin

Personal details
- Born: Charles Cotesworth Pinckney Arndt; October 31, 1811 Wilkes-Barre, Pennsylvania, U.S.
- Died: February 11, 1842 (aged 30) Madison, Wisconsin Territory, U.S.
- Cause of death: Homicide, by James R. Vineyard
- Resting place: Woodlawn Cemetery, Green Bay, Wisconsin
- Party: Whig
- Spouse: Catharine Ann Marsh (m. 1835–1842)
- Children: Margaret Elizabeth (Field)^{(b. 1836)}; Joseph Manning Marsh Arndt^{(b. 1838; died 1904)}; Imogene Cotton Arndt^{(b. 1840)}
- Parent: John Penn Arndt (father)
- Education: Rutgers College
- Profession: lawyer, legislator

Charles Cotesworth Pinckney Arndt (October 31, 1811 – February 11, 1842) was an American lawyer, Whig politician, and Wisconsin pioneer. While serving as a member of the Council of the Wisconsin Territory, he was shot and killed by fellow councillor, James Russell Vineyard.

== Early life and education ==
Charles Arndt was born in Wilkes-Barre, Pennsylvania, the fifth child of John Penn Arndt and his wife Elizabeth (née Carpenter). Charles moved with his parents to the Michigan Territory in 1822, first settling at Mackinac Island, and then continuing west in 1824 to Green Bay, in the territory that would later become Wisconsin. He graduated from Rutgers College in 1832, and went on to study law under Joel Jones at Easton, Pennsylvania, for the next three years. He was admitted to the bar in 1835, and the following year moved back to Green Bay, where he was admitted to practice law in the Michigan Territory.

== In the legislature ==
Arndt was a close friend of Wisconsin Territory Governor James Duane Doty. He became affiliated with the Whig Party and was elected to the Council (upper legislative house) of the Wisconsin Territory in the Fall 1839 election, representing the vast northeastern district. He served in the 2nd and 3rd legislative assemblies. His father had previously served on the Council during the 1st Legislative Assembly.

== Death ==
On February 11, 1842, Arndt was involved in a heated debate on the floor of the Council chamber with James Russell Vineyard, of Grant County. Arndt was giving passionate support to Enos S. Baker, Governor Doty's nominee to serve as sheriff of Grant County. Vineyard, who was also considered a candidate for the sheriff's office, was staunchly opposed to the confirmation of Baker.

During the debate, Arndt produced a number of testimonials from Grant County voters attesting to the quality of Baker's character, which Vineyard declared to be false. Arndt and Vineyard exchanged heated words. A few minutes later, the session was adjourned. Arndt approached Vineyard and asked him directly if he had imputed that his remarks had been false. Vineyard confirmed, and Arndt struck him in the head. Vineyard pulled out a revolver and fired one shot into Arndt's chest. He died in less than five minutes.

Vineyard was almost immediately indicted, but was acquitted on grounds of self-defense at his trial in October 1843. Vineyard attempted to submit his resignation to the Council on February 14, 1842, but his resignation was rejected, and the Council instead voted 10–1 in favor of expelling him.

Charles Dickens (who had been doing a lecture tour of the United States at the time of the incident) described the attack as an example of the violent depravity of American culture in his American Notes for General Circulation.

== Personal life and family ==
Arndt was a descendant of Bernhard Arndt, an early settler of the Province of Pennsylvania.

He married Catharine Ann Marsh on May 5, 1835. They had one son and two daughters.

== See also ==
- List of assassinated American politicians
