= George Batchelder (Wisconsin pioneer) =

American politician (1807–1871)

Coroner of Trempealeau County, Wisconsin
- In office January 1, 1863 – January 1, 1865
- Preceded by: Daniel W. Gilfillan
- Succeeded by: Henry Lake

Member of the House of Representatives of the Wisconsin Territory for Racine County
- In office November 2, 1840 – November 7, 1842 Serving with Thomas E. Parmelee & Reuben H. Deming
- Preceded by: Orrin R. Stevens, Zadoc Newman, & Tristam C. Hoyt
- Succeeded by: Philander Judson, John Todd Trowbridge, & Peter Van Vliet

Personal details
- Born: March 14, 1807 Bradford, Vermont, U.S.
- Died: August 25, 1871 (aged 64) Trempealeau County, Wisconsin, U.S.
- Resting place: Trempealeau Cemetery, Trempealeau, Wisconsin
- Party: Republican; Liberty (mid-1840s); Democratic (before 1845)
- Spouse: Eliza Eastman (m. 1834–1871)
- Children: Octavius E. Batchelder^{(b. 1837; died 1897)}; Betsey E. (Newland)^{(b. 1839; died 1890)}; Iowa Luella (Doud)^{(b. 1843; died 1870)}; Adelbert Batchelder^{(b. 1849; died 1909)}
- Occupation: Merchant

George Batchelder (March 14, 1807 – August 25, 1871) was an American merchant, politician, and Wisconsin pioneer. He was one of the earliest American settlers in what is now Trempealeau County, Wisconsin, and was described as the "first merchant, first school teacher, first store keeper, and first hotel keeper" of Trempealeau. Earlier, he represented Racine and Kenosha counties in the 3rd Wisconsin Territorial Assembly (1840–1842).

== Biography ==
George Batchelder was born in March 1807 in Bradford, Vermont. After receiving his initial education, he taught school in Lisbon, New Hampshire. In the mid-1830s, Batchelder operated a merchant business until 1837, when he moved west to the Wisconsin Territory.

He settled initially in Racine County, near the settlement that is now Burlington, Wisconsin.

In December 1838, Batchelder was hired as a transcribing clerk in the territory House of Representatives for the 2nd Wisconsin Territorial Assembly. Two years later, he was elected as one of Racine County's three representatives to the 3rd Wisconsin Territorial Assembly, running on the Democratic Party ticket. He was re-elected in 1841.

In the mid-1840s, Batchelder moved further west into Walworth County, Wisconsin, and settled at Sugar Creek, Wisconsin. In May 1852, he continued west with his family, settling finally in what is now Trempealeau County, Wisconsin. At the time of his arrival in that area, his family was described as the only white family in the settlement that is now Trempealeau, Wisconsin (at the time known as "Montoville").

After serving in the legislature, Batchelder left the Democratic Party and became part of the short-lived anti-slavery Liberty Party. In the 1850s, he ultimately became a member of the new Republican Party, but he was much less politically active after moving to Trempealeau County.

In Trempealeau, Batchelder established a store and hotel, and taught school. When Trempealeau County was officially organized in 1854, Batchelder ran for county judge in the first election, but lost to Benjamin F. Heuston; the vote was 34–23. Though not elected county-wide, he was elected chairman of the town of Montoville, and served on the county board of supervisors. He later served two more terms on the board of supervisors, in 1861 and 1871, and served as coroner of Trempealeau County from 1863 to 1865.

Batchelder died of a stroke while out in a field near his home.

== Personal life and family ==
George Batchelder was the seventh of nine children born to Reverend Daniel Batchelder (1765–ca.1833) and his wife Phoebe (née Chase; 1767–1858). Reverend Batchelder was a Free Will Baptist preacher, and the first ordained minister in Orange County, Vermont, and established two churches near Corinth, Vermont. The Batchelder family were descended from Reverend Stephen Bachiler, who arrived in the Massachusetts Bay Colony in 1632.

George Batchelder married Eliza Eastman on December 1, 1834, in Landaff, New Hampshire. They had at least four children who survived to adulthood.
