= Alexander J. Irwin =

American politician (1799–1847)

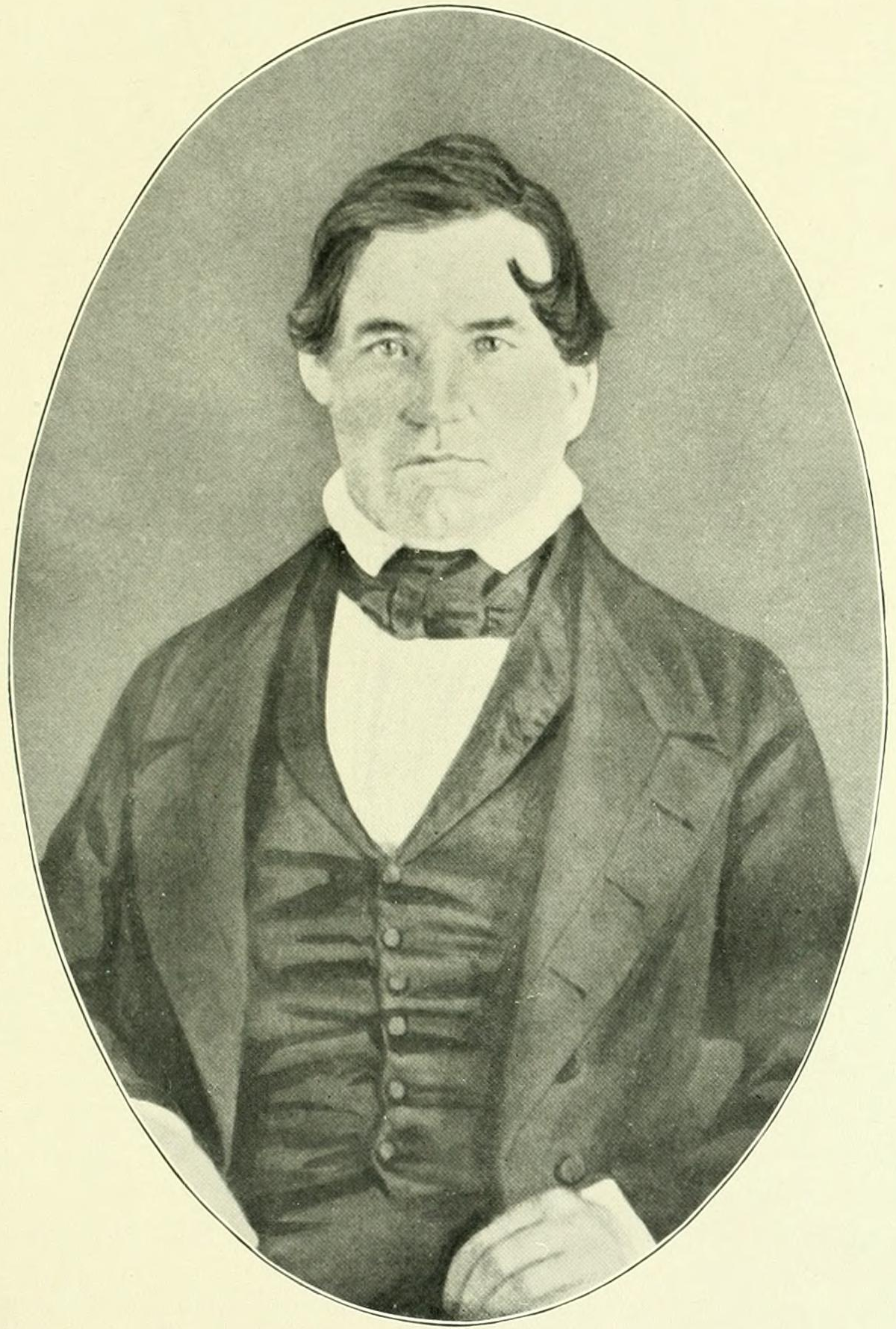

Member of the Council of the Wisconsin Territory for Brown County
- In office December 26, 1837 – December 2, 1839 Serving with John Penn Arndt (1837–1838), and Morgan L. Martin (1838–1839)
- Preceded by: Joseph Dickinson
- Succeeded by: Charles C. P. Arndt

Member of the House of Representatives of the Wisconsin Territory for Brown County
- In office October 25, 1836 – December 7, 1836 Serving with Ebenezer Childs, and Albert G. Ellis
- Preceded by: Position established
- Succeeded by: George McWilliams

Personal details
- Born: March 1, 1799 Greensburg, Pennsylvania, U.S.
- Died: June 14, 1847 (aged 48) Green Bay, Wisconsin, U.S.
- Cause of death: Infection
- Resting place: Woodlawn Cemetery, Green Bay, Wisconsin
- Spouse: Frances Pamela Smith (m. 1827–1847)
- Children: Maria Jane (Wheelock)^{(b. 1828; died 1912)}; Elizabeth (Whitney)^{(b. 1830; died 1909)}; Robert A. Irwin^{(died 1891)}; (Mrs. Henry J. Turber)^{(died 1912)}; Harriette Brown Irwin^{(b. 1839; died 1928)}; Horace Smith Irwin^{(died age 2)}; Emilie R. Irwin^{(b. 1847; died 1919)}
- Relatives: Robert Irwin Jr. (brother)

Alexander Johnson Irwin (March 1, 1799 – June 14, 1847) was an American merchant and Wisconsin pioneer. He represented Brown County in the Legislative Assembly of the Wisconsin Territory during the 1st and 2nd legislative assemblies.

== Early life ==
Born in Greensburg, Pennsylvania, on March 1, 1799, Irwin moved with his family to Detroit, Michigan Territory, and then to Green Bay in 1823. Irwin and his brother Robert Irwin Jr. were in the mercantile business in Green Bay. In 1827 he married Frances Pamelia Smith, with whom he had seven children.

== Legislative career ==
In the first election after the creation of the Wisconsin Territory, in the Fall of 1836, Irwin was elected to the Territory's House of Representatives. However, his opponent in the election, George McWilliams, challenged the results of the election. Irwin was allowed to occupy the seat while a committee investigated the election challenge. Ultimately, the committee found in favor of Irwin on questions of the vote count, but highlighted the issue that at the time of the election, Irwin was also serving as postmaster. In the federal act which established the Wisconsin Territory, it was prohibited for an existing officeholder to be elected to the Legislative Assembly. Therefore, the House voted in favor of McWilliams.

This same issue arose in Irwin's next election, in the Fall of 1837, when he was a candidate for the council. In that election, Irwin's opponent, Joseph Dickinson, was declared the winner and took the seat. Irwin challenged the result, pointing out that Dickinson—like Irwin in 1836—was an incumbent postmaster when elected to the council. The Council agreed with Irwin's position, and voted to remove Dickinson and install Irwin.

== Land office ==
In 1845, he was appointed receiver of the Green Bay Land Office. The position required trips on horseback to Saint Louis, Missouri, to deposit funds because there were no banks in Green Bay at the time. His extensive travel duties led to an infection in his arm, which resulted in his death. Irwin died in Green Bay in 1847 while still in office. Elisha Morrow was appointed receiver to fill the vacancy left by Irwin.
