= John Wilford Blackstone Sr. =

American lawyer and Wisconsin pioneer

The Honorable John W. Blackstone
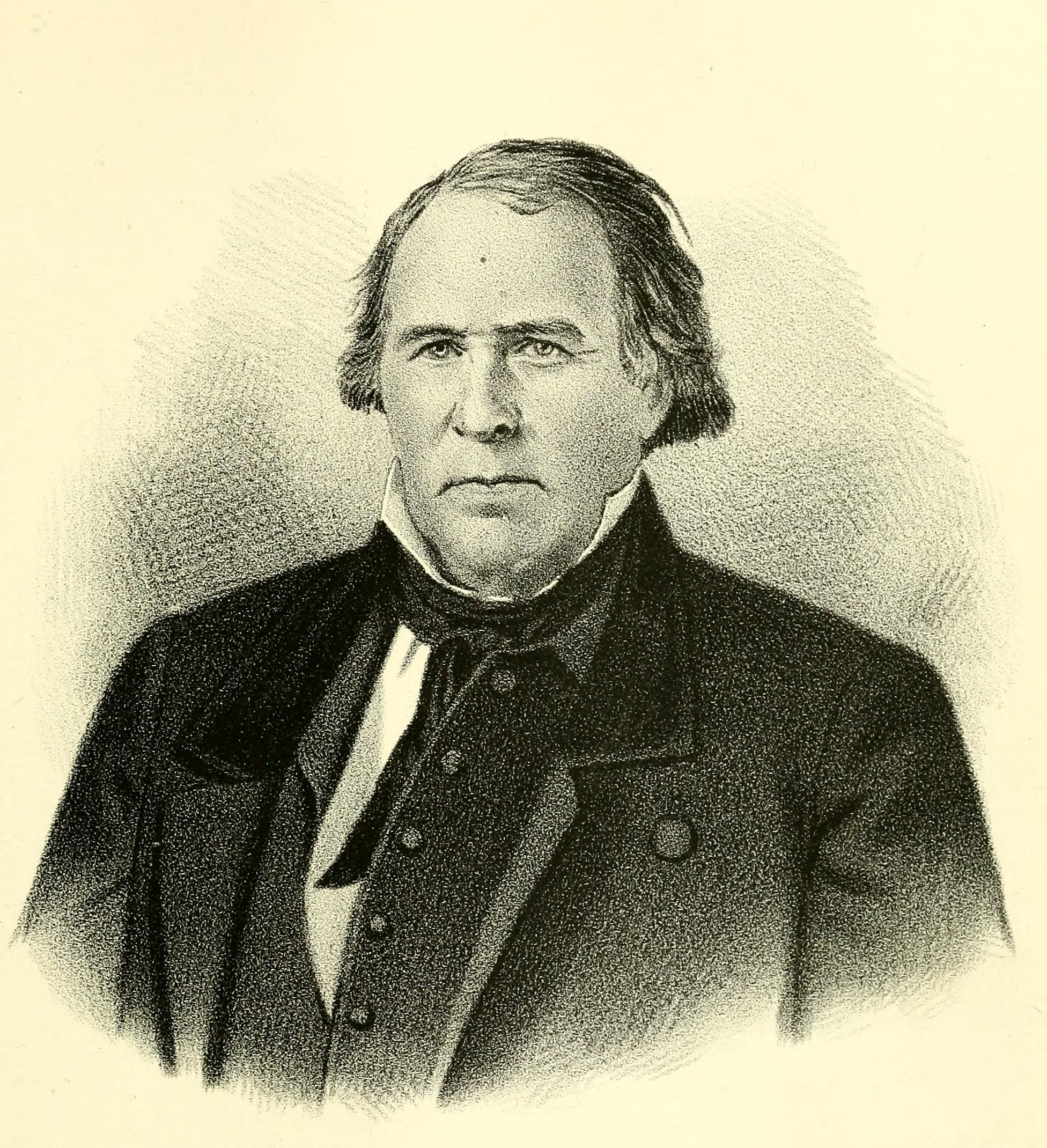

4th Speaker of the Legislative Assembly of the Wisconsin Territory
- In office November 26, 1838 – January 21, 1839
- Preceded by: William B. Sheldon
- Succeeded by: Lucius Israel Barber

Representative to the Legislative Assembly of the Wisconsin Territory from Iowa County
- In office November 26, 1838 – December 7, 1840 Serving with Russel Baldwin (1838-1840), Henry M. Billings (1838-1840), Thomas Jenkins (1838-1840), Charles Bracken (1839-1840)

Chairman of the Lafayette County Board of Supervisors
- In office April 1858 – April 1861
- Preceded by: J. De Selhorst
- Succeeded by: J. D. Martin

Personal details
- Born: John Wilford Blackstone; October 18, 1796 Madison, New York
- Died: October 15, 1868 (aged 71) Shullsburg, Wisconsin
- Resting place: Evergreen Cemetery; Shullsburg, Wisconsin
- Party: Republican; Whig (before 1855)
- Spouses: Catherine (Tomlinson) Hammond; (m. 1833; died 1865)
- Children: Theodore E. Blackstone^{(b. 1834; died 1890)}; John Wilford Blackstone Jr.^{(b. 1835; died 1911)}; Isabel Blackstone^{(b. 1837; died 1861)}; Joseph Blackstone^{(b. 1839)}; Augustus Blackstone^{(b. 1842)}; Eugene Blackstone^{(b. 1844; died 1867)}; Jeanette (Blackstone) Beckwith^{(b. 1844; died 1934)}
- Parents: Stephen F. Blackstone (father); Anna (Wilford) Blackstone (mother)
- Education: Hamilton College
- Profession: lawyer, judge

Military service
- Allegiance: United States
- Branch/service: Michigan Territorial Militia
- Years of service: 1832
- Rank: Lieutenant
- Battles/wars: Black Hawk War

John Wilford Blackstone Sr. (October 18, 1796 – October 15, 1868) was an American lawyer and Wisconsin pioneer. He was Speaker of the Legislative Assembly of the Wisconsin Territory, and served as County Judge of Iowa County, when it was still organized under the Michigan Territory.

== Biography ==
Blackstone's parents were born in Connecticut Colony, but relocated to Madison, Madison County, New York, where John Wilford Blakstone was born in 1796. He was educated at public schools in Madison until age 17, when he attended Hamilton College in Oneida County, New York. He graduated in 1819.

Three months prior to his graduation, he adventured with a friend by boat up the Allegheny River, onto the Ohio, and then down the Mississippi to Memphis, Tennessee. They took a stash of merchandise with them and visited several towns and camps along the banks of the rivers, trading their goods until they were all exhausted. He returned from Memphis to New York and, on his arrival, began to study law. In 1822 he was admitted to the New York State Bar. Over the next few years, he would study medicine and spend two years in Canada.

In 1828, he permanently removed to the west, setting out on another boat up the Allegheny. He arrived first at Shawneetown, Illinois, then resided for a time at Galena, Illinois, then moving, that winter, to Mineral Point, Wisconsin, then in the Michigan Territory, where he would remain for two years, working in the lead mining industry and practicing law. In 1830, after the organization of Iowa County, he was made a county judge. At the time, Iowa County contained all the land in Wisconsin south of the Wisconsin River and west of the river's major bend.

In 1832, he volunteered for the Michigan Territory Militia in the Black Hawk War and was made a Lieutenant under Colonel Henry Dodge. After the war, in 1833, he married Catherine Hammond, the widow of Blackstone's former partner James Hammond, at Galena.

In the spring of 1835, he purchased a farm near White Oak Springs, where he would reside for the rest of his life. In 1838, after the separation of Iowa Territory from Wisconsin Territory, he would be elected to the 2nd Wisconsin Territorial Legislature as a representative of Iowa County. At the first session of that legislature, during the winter of 1838-39, he was chosen as Speaker.

In 1847, his home fell into the newly organized Lafayette County, created from the southern half of what remained of Iowa County. He was a member of the first grand jury of White Oak Springs, in 1847, and, in 1849, was a member of the first County Board of Supervisors. He would remain on the Board of Supervisors as the representative of White Oak Springs through the 1861 session, and served as chairman of the County Board from 1858 through 1860.

He died in 1868 and was buried at the family farm.

== Personal life and family ==
Blackstone is a direct descendant of William Blaxton (Blackstone), one of the first colonists of the Plymouth Colony, and the first English resident at Boston (1623) and Rhode Island (1635). The name "Blackstone" appears on many landmarks of New England due to his noteworthy ancestor.

Blackstone married Mrs. Catherine (or Katharine) Hammond in Galena, Illinois, on April 4, 1833. She had one daughter from her previous marriage. They had seven children together. Their son John W. Blackstone Jr. served in the Wisconsin state legislature and was also a county judge.
