= Edward Silas Tobey =

Edward Silas Tobey (1813 – March 29, 1891) served as the postmaster at the Boston Office, president of American Missionary Association and president of Boston Board of Trade. He was the Republican Party nominee in the 1861 Boston mayoral election.
