= Joshua White (politician) =

American politician and businessman (1814-1890)

Joshua White (February 15, 1814 – July 16, 1890) was an American businessman and politician.

Born in Loudoun County, Virginia, White moved to Ogle County, Illinois and settled in what is now Stillman Valley, Illinois in 1838. He was a farmer and livestock breeder. He also opened a furniture store in Rockford, Illinois. In 1844, he open a store in White Oak Springs Wisconsin Territory. During that time, White served on the first Wisconsin Constitutional Convention of 1846. He lived in Chicago, Illinois 1848–1850, but moved back to Ogle County. He served in the Illinois House of Representatives 1857-1858 and in local government. He died in Ogle County, Illinois. His son, Frank White, served as Governor of North Dakota and in the North Dakota Legislative Assembly.
