= Charles H. Larrabee =

American judge, politician, pioneer, and Union Army Colonel in the American Civil War

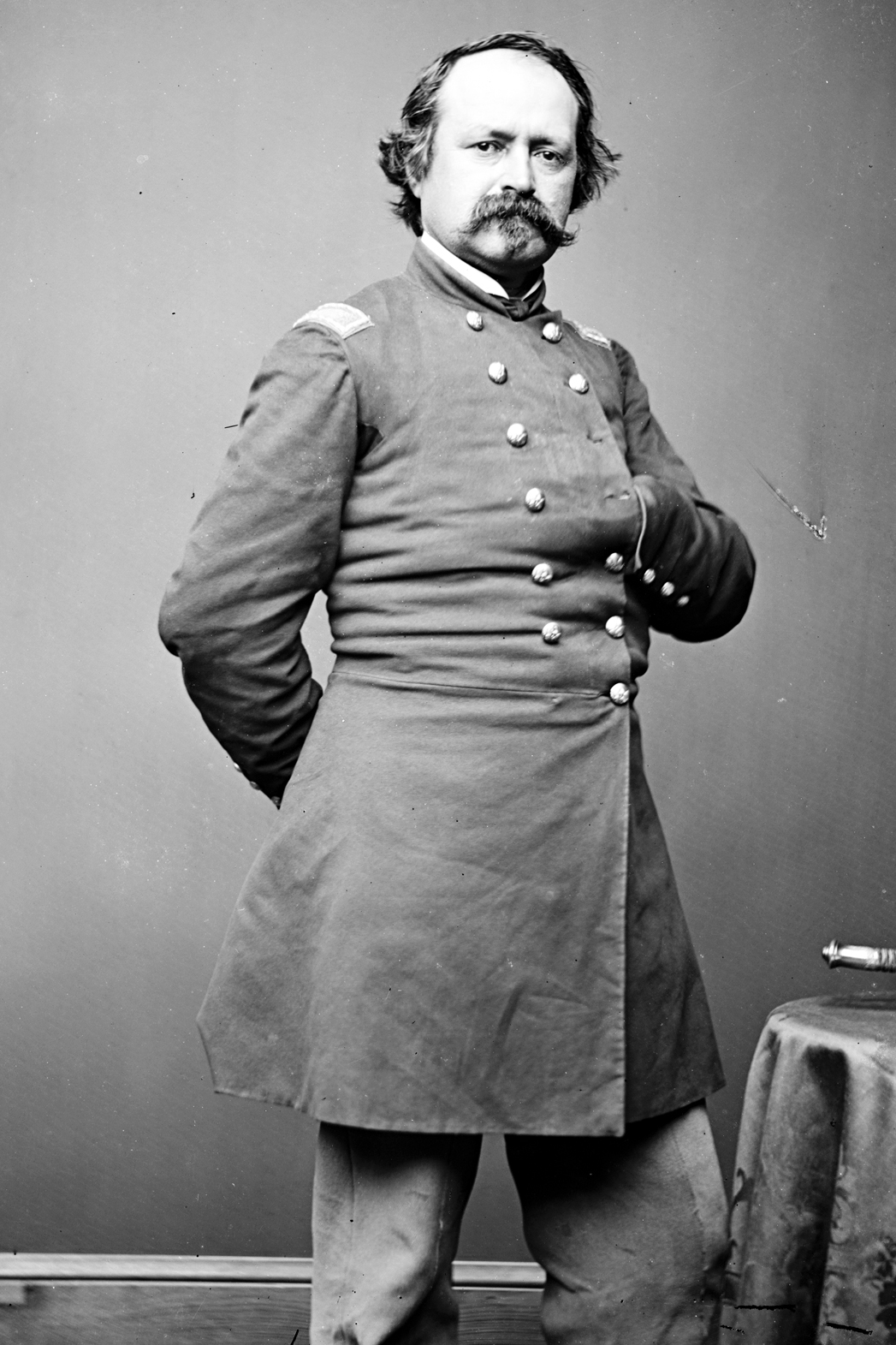

Member of the U.S. House of Representatives from Wisconsin's 3rd district
- In office March 4, 1859 – March 3, 1861
- Preceded by: Charles Billinghurst
- Succeeded by: A. Scott Sloan

Justice of the Wisconsin Supreme Court
- ex officio
- In office August 28, 1848 – June 1, 1853

Wisconsin Circuit Court Judge for the 3rd Circuit
- In office August 28, 1848 – September 1858
- Preceded by: Position Established
- Succeeded by: A. Scott Sloan

Personal details
- Born: Charles Hathaway Larrabee; November 9, 1820 Rome, New York, U.S.
- Died: January 20, 1883 (aged 62) Tehachapi, California, U.S.
- Cause of death: 1883 Tehachapi train wreck
- Resting place: Masonic Cemetery, San Francisco^{(originally)} Woodlawn Memorial Park Cemetery, Colma, California^{(re-interred 1931)}
- Party: Democratic
- Spouses: Minerva Norton (m. 1846; died 1873); Elizabeth L. Turner (m. 1878–1883)
- Children: Charles Norton Larrabee^{(b. 1848)}; Minerva (Burton)^{(b. 1850; died 1912)}

Military service
- Allegiance: United States
- Branch/service: United States Volunteers; Union Army
- Years of service: 1861–1863
- Rank: Colonel, USV
- Unit: 5th Reg. Wis. Vol. Infantry
- Commands: 24th Reg. Wis. Vol. Infantry
- Battles/wars: American Civil War; Peninsula Campaign; Siege of Yorktown (1862); Battle of Williamsburg; Confederate Heartland Offensive; Battle of Perryville

Charles Hathaway Larrabee (November 9, 1820 – January 20, 1883) was an American lawyer, Democratic politician, and Wisconsin pioneer. He served one term in the U.S. House of Representatives, representing Wisconsin's 3rd congressional district during the 36th Congress (1859–1860). Before being elected to Congress, he was one of Wisconsin's first state circuit court judges, and because of that role was an ex officio member of Wisconsin's first state Supreme Court (1848–1853).

After his term in Congress, he enrolled in the Union Army and commanded the 24th Wisconsin Infantry Regiment in the American Civil War. Later in life he practiced law in California, where he died in the 1883 Tehachapi train wreck.

== Early life ==
Larrabee was born in Rome, New York on November 9, 1820, the son of Charles Larrabee of Connecticut. His family moved to Cincinnati, Ohio, where young Charles attended Springfield Academy and then Granville College from 1834 to 1836. At Granville he specialized in English studies, mathematics and ancient languages. Later, he read law with Samson Mason and W.A. Rogers in Springfield, Ohio.

He studied law with Congressman Samson Mason in Ohio, but before becoming a lawyer, Larrabee worked as an engineer and helped survey the Little Miami Railroad. He was admitted to the bar in September 1841, in Pontotoc, Mississippi, and in the same year ran unsuccessfully for the Mississippi Legislature. He moved to Chicago in 1844, where he edited the Democratic Advocate and was elected city attorney. On May 13, 1846, in Chicago, he married his first wife, Minerva Norton.

=== Family ===
In 1840, Larrabee married Minerva Norton. They were the parents of a son, Charles, and a daughter, Minerva ("Minnie"). Minnie Larrabee was the wife of George H. Burton.

== Wisconsin ==
In March 1847, Larrabee and his wife moved to a settlement in Dodge County in the Wisconsin Territory. Larrabee opened the first business in the settlement, where he sold goods from Chicago, shipped via Lake Michigan to Milwaukee and carried over land to Dodge County. Larrabee became one of the leading residents of the small town, and gave it the name Horicon. Larrabee is recognized as one of the founders of the city.

In October 1847, Larrabee was chosen as one of three representatives for Dodge County to the 2nd Wisconsin Constitutional Convention. His chief preoccupation there was establishing a homestead exemption that would protect people from becoming homeless or destitute in the event of debt or liability.

After the new constitution was adopted in 1848, Larrabee was elected Circuit Judge for the 3rd district, and was, by virtue of that role, a member of the state's first Supreme Court. He was the youngest person to serve on that court.

A new Wisconsin Supreme Court was created in 1852. Larrabee was chosen as the Democratic nominee for Chief Justice, but he was defeated by "the older and more experienced" Edward V. Whiton in the general election.

Larrabee served for ten years as Circuit Judge until his nomination for the U.S. House of Representatives in 1858. He went on to win that election to represent Wisconsin's 3rd congressional district in the 36th Congress. At the time, his district was the largest—by population—in the country, with 350,000 people.

In Congress, Larrabee spoke fervently in favor of maintaining the Union, and defended the patriotism and loyalty of German American immigrants living in Wisconsin.

Larrabee ran for re-election, and supported the platform of Senator Stephen A. Douglas, the Democratic candidate for U.S. President in the 1860 election. Douglas was defeated by Abraham Lincoln, and Larrabee lost his seat along with dozens of other Democrats in the realignment elections of 1860.

== Civil War ==
After the news of the attack on Fort Sumter reached Wisconsin, Larrabee wrote to the Milwaukee News, a Democratic paper, to rally his party in defense of the Union. He also wrote to Wisconsin Governor Alexander Randall and General Rufus King to offer his services.

On April 18, 1861, Larrabee enlisted as a private in the Horicon Guard militia, where he was elected 2nd lieutenant. The militia quickly marched to Milwaukee for enrollment in a Volunteer Regiment. A month later, on May 28, 1861, Governor Randall commissioned Larrabee as a major for the 5th Wisconsin Volunteer Infantry Regiment.

Larrabee marched with the 5th Regiment to Washington, D.C., where they eventually attached to the Army of the Potomac.

In 1862, the Regiment joined the Peninsula Campaign. Larrabee participated in the Siege of Yorktown, assisting in the attack on a fortress along the Warwick River. Days later, the regiment was involved in heavy fighting at Fort Magruder during the Battle of Williamsburg. Larrabee was commended for his work inspiring and directing the regiment during the battle.

After the battle, they marched through the Chickahominy marsh land, and Larrabee fell ill along with others in the regiment. He recuperated at White House, Virginia, but would continue to exhibit symptoms.

When new Wisconsin regiments were raised that summer, Governor Edward Salomon appointed Larrabee to organize and command the new 24th Wisconsin Volunteer Infantry Regiment. When the 24th regiment mustered into service in August, Larrabee was promoted to colonel. The regiment was quickly ordered to Kentucky, before much drilling or preparation.

The regiment was attached to the Army of the Cumberland, and arrived in time to join the Battle of Perryville, which ended the Confederate incursion in Kentucky. During the battle, the 24th was assigned to defend a cannon battery, which came under assault from a Confederate brigade, led by Daniel Weisiger Adams. The attack was repulsed, and Larrabee was commended by his brigade commander, Colonel Nicholas Greusel, for his leadership in the defense of the battery.

After the battle, Larrabee again fell ill and recuperated in Nashville, Tennessee, while the regiment fought at the Battle of Stones River. In March, 1863, Larrabee returned to the regiment for a short time, but ultimately resigned in August due to his ongoing illness.

== Postbellum years ==
In the spring of 1864, still plagued by his illnesses—diarrhea and erysipelas in the head—he sought relief in the climates of California, then Nevada, then Oregon, where he practiced law with his old congressional colleague, Lansing Stout. He later returned to California, where his wife died in August, 1873.

After his wife's death, he moved to Seattle in the Washington Territory and resided with Beriah Brown. While there he became a member of a state constitutional convention and helped to organize a state university in Seattle.

In 1868 he was in Los Angeles, California, where he and William A. Winder, the former commander of the U.S. prison on Alcatraz Island, opened an agency "for the purchase and sale of lands in the southern part of the state." In April 1868 he was elected city attorney. None of the officials elected at that time served, however, and the election "seems to have been wholly ignored."

Larrabee eventually settled in San Bernardino, California, where he resumed his law practice.

== Death ==
Larrabee was killed in a train accident at the Tehachapi Loop near Tehachapi, California, on January 20, 1883. He was survived by a son and daughter. Interment was in the Masonic Cemetery, San Francisco.

An attempt was made in the settlement of his estate to show that the claim by his second wife was not legitimate, but she produced a marriage certificate and letters to show that it was, and the marriage was therefore allowed in San Bernardino Superior Court. In June 1884, John Anderson, executor of Larrabee's estate, filed a court action in San Bernardino against the Central Pacific Railroad, asking $100,000 in damages.

The town of Larrabee, Wisconsin, is named in his honor.

== Electoral history ==
=== Wisconsin Supreme Court (1852) ===
1852 Wisconsin Supreme Court Chief Justice election
Party	Candidate	Votes	%	±%
General Election, September 1852
Independent	Edward V. Whiton	11,792	54.60%	
Democratic	Charles H. Larrabee	9,806	45.40%	
Plurality		1,986	9.20%	
Total votes		21,598	100.0%	
Independent win (new seat)				

=== U.S. House of Representatives (1858, 1860) ===
Wisconsin's 3rd Congressional District Election, 1858
Party	Candidate	Votes	%	±%
General Election, November 2, 1858
Democratic	Charles H. Larrabee	23,905	50.95%	+2.99%
Republican	Charles Billinghurst (incumbent)	23,011	49.05%	
Plurality		894	1.91%	-2.18%
Total votes		46,916	100.0%	-6.42%
Democratic gain from Republican				

Wisconsin's 3rd Congressional District Election, 1860
Party	Candidate	Votes	%	±%
General Election, November 6, 1860
Republican	A. Scott Sloan	34,002	53.98%	+4.93%
Democratic	Charles H. Larrabee (incumbent)	28,986	46.02%	
Plurality		5,016	7.96%	+6.06%
Total votes		62,988	100.0%	+34.26%
Republican gain from Democratic				

Military offices
Regiment established	Command of the 24th Wisconsin Infantry Regiment; August 22, 1862 – August 27, 1863	Succeeded by Lt. Col. Theodore S. West
U.S. House of Representatives
Preceded by Charles Billinghurst	Member of the U.S. House of Representatives from Wisconsin's 3rd congressional district March 4, 1859 – March 3, 1861	Succeeded by A. Scott Sloan
Legal offices
New state government	Wisconsin Circuit Court Judge for the 3rd Circuit; August 28, 1848 – September 1858	Succeeded by A. Scott Sloan
