= Hezekiah C. Tilton =

American politician

Hezekiah C. Tilton was a member of the Wisconsin State Assembly.

== Biography ==
Tilton was born on August 30, 1818. He became a Methodist clergyman. During the American Civil War, he served for a time as Chaplain of the 13th Wisconsin Volunteer Infantry Regiment of the Union Army. Tilton died on March 26, 1879.

== Political career ==
Tilton was a member of the Assembly in 1864. In 1875, he was nominated by the Prohibition Party for Governor of Wisconsin, but declined. Later, he was appointed to the State Board of Charities and Reform.
