= James Gilmore (Wisconsin politician) =

American politician

James Gilmore (September 20, 1786 – November 28, 1848) was a member of the Wisconsin State Assembly.

== Biography ==
Gilmore was born in 1786 in Pawlet, Vermont. He died in 1848 (Note: The 1919 issue of Collections of the State Historical Society of Wisconsin incorrectly gives his death year as 1859.) in Jamestown, Wisconsin where he lived.

== Assembly career ==
Gilmore was a member of the Assembly during the 1st Wisconsin Legislature in 1848, representing the 1st District of Grant County, Wisconsin. He was a Whig.
