= Archibald Nichols =

American politician

Archibald Nichols (May 12, 1819 – November 1, 1903) was a member of the Wisconsin State Assembly.

== Biography ==
Nichols was born on May 12, 1819, in Norway, New York. An Episcopalian, Nichols married his wife, Mary, at Grace Episcopal Church in Norway on April 22, 1845, and they had five children. Nichols was a farmer by trade. He died on November 1, 1903, and was buried in Lawton, Oklahoma.

== Political career ==
Nichols was a member of the Assembly during the 1848, 1854, 1862, 1872 and 1872 sessions representing at different times the counties of Marquette, Green Lake and Waushara. In addition, he was Chairman (similar to Mayor) of the Markesan, Wisconsin Board of Supervisors (similar to city council), a member of the Green Lake County Board of Supervisors and a justice of the peace. Nichols originally served as Whig, later as a Republican and was elected to his final term in the Assembly as an independent.
