= 1861 Boston mayoral election =

Election in Massachusetts, United States

- December 9, 1861
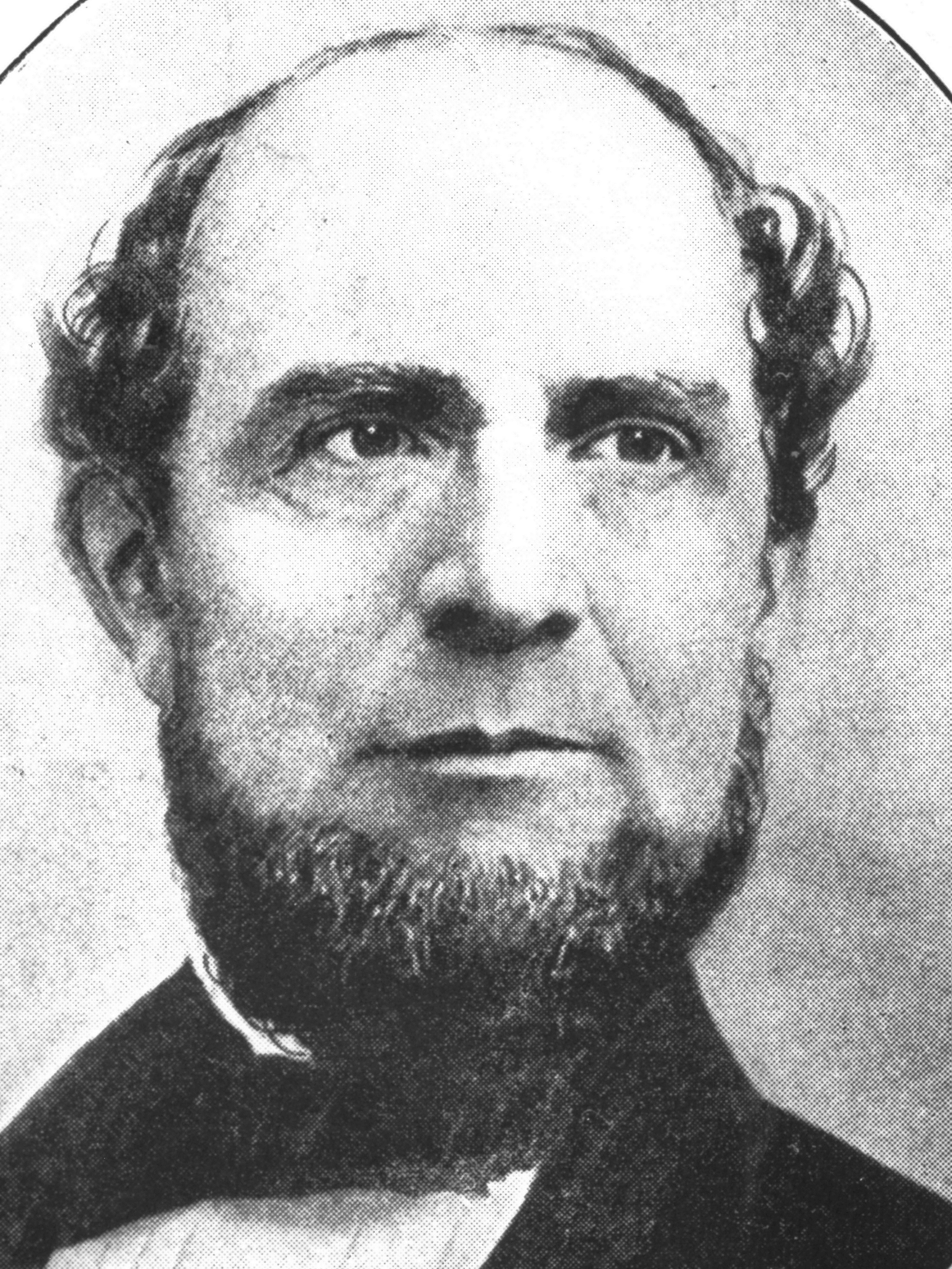

Candidate	Joseph Wightman	Edward Silas Tobey
Party	Democratic	Republican
Popular vote	6,765	5,795
Percentage	53.84%	46.12%
Mayor before election
Joseph Wightman
Democratic
Elected mayor
Joseph Wightman
Democratic

The Boston mayoral election of 1861 took place on Monday, December 9, 1861, and saw the reelection of Joseph Wightman.

Wightman was nominated by both the Democratic Party and "Citizens" tickets. His opponent, Edward Silas Tobey, was nominated by the Republican Party.

== Results ==
1861 Boston mayoral election
Party	Candidate	Votes	%
Democratic	Joseph Wightman (incumbent)	6,765	53.84
Republican	Edward Silas Tobey	5,795	46.12
Other	Scattering	4	0.03
Turnout		12,564	

=== Results by ward ===
	Wightman (Democratic)		Tobey (Republican)		Others		Top-2 margin (+/− if won by D/R)		Cumulative vote
Ward	Vote	%	Vote	%	Vote	%	Vote	%	Vote
1st	828	79.01	220	20.99	0	0.00	+ 608	+ 58.02	1,048
2nd	628	47.58	692	52.42	0	0.00	− 64	− 4.85	1,320
3rd	545	76.44	168	23.56	0	0.00	+ 377	+ 52.88	713
4th	423	54.37	353	45.37	2	0.26	+ 70	+ 9.00	778
5th	454	47.94	493	52.06	0	0.00	− 39	− 4.12	947
6th	458	38.10	743	61.81	1	0.08	− 285	− 23.71	1,202
7th	518	72.86	193	27.14	0	0.00	+ 325	+ 45.71	711
8th	409	47.84	446	52.16	0	0.00	− 37	− 4.33	855
9th	406	48.16	437	51.84	0	0.00	− 31	− 3.68	843
10th	464	54.52	387	45.48	0	0.00	+ 77	+ 9.05	851
11th	822	68.67	374	31.24	1	0.08	+ 448	+ 37.43	1,197
12th	810	54.04	689	45.96	0	0.00	+ 121	+ 8.07	1,499
Total	6,765	53.84	5,795	46.12	4	0.03	+ 970	+ 7.72	12,564

== See also ==
- List of mayors of Boston, Massachusetts
