= David Newland =

American politician

8th Speaker of the Legislative Assembly of the Wisconsin Territory
- In office December 7, 1840 – December 5, 1842
- Preceded by: Nelson Dewey
- Succeeded by: Albert Gallatin Ellis

Member of the Council of the Wisconsin Territory from Milwaukee and Washington counties
- In office December 5, 1842 – January 6, 1845 Serving with Hans Crocker, Lemuel White
- Preceded by: Don A. J. Upham and John H. Tweedy
- Succeeded by: Adam E. Ray, James Kneeland, and Jacob H. Kimball

Representative to the Legislative Assembly of the Wisconsin Territory from Iowa County
- In office December 7, 1840 – December 5, 1842 Serving with Francis J. Dunn (1840-1841), Ephraim F. Ogden (1840-1842), Daniel M. Parkison (1840-1842), Thomas Jenkins (1841-1842)

Member of the North Carolina Senate from the Burke County district
- In office November 15, 1830 – November 21, 1831
- Preceded by: Merritt Burgin
- Succeeded by: Mark Brittain

Member of the North Carolina House of Representatives from the Burke County district
- In office December 25, 1826 – November 15, 1830 Serving with Edwin Poor (1826), David Neill (1827), Mark Brittain (1828), Joseph Neill (1829)
- Preceded by: Peter Balle and Edwin Poor
- Succeeded by: Alney Burgin and Elias A. Hooper

Personal details
- Born: David Newland c. 1799 Burke County, North Carolina, US
- Died: December 19, 1857 (aged 57–58) Washington, D.C., US
- Cause of death: Drowning
- Party: Democratic
- Spouses: Cynthia Ann McDonald; (m. 1833; died 1896)
- Children: David Benson Newland^{(b. 1849; died 1849)}; Kate (Sproat) (Dawer)

Military service
- Allegiance: United States
- Branch/service: North Carolina Militia
- Rank: Brigadier General

David Newland (c. 1799 – December 19, 1857) was an American politician in North Carolina and Wisconsin. He was Speaker of the 3rd Legislative Assembly of the Wisconsin Territory. Earlier in his life he served as a member of the North Carolina Senate and House of Commons, and was involved in a disputed 1835 congressional election in North Carolina against James Graham.

== Early career ==
Born in Burke County, North Carolina, Newland and his brothers ran a mail coach business using horse-drawn wagons with state contracts.

Newland became involved in politics and was elected to the North Carolina House of Commons in 1826, representing Burke County. He would be re-elected for 1827, 1828, and 1829. In 1830, he was Burke County's representative in the North Carolina Senate, and, in 1831, he was elected to the North Carolina Council of State. He was appointed a Colonel in the North Carolina Militia sometime before 1830, and was made a Brigadier General in late 1832. Newland was a supporter of Andrew Jackson in his bid for the presidency in 1828 and remained aligned with Democratic politics.

In 1833, Newland made his first bid for election to Congress. He ran in North Carolina's 12th congressional district as an anti-nullification Jacksonian Democrat. He came in third place, behind the incumbent pro-nullification Democrat Samuel Price Carson and National Republican James Graham, who won the seat.

== Disputed election ==
His second attempt at election to Congress, in 1835, resulted in a controversy that was appealed to the House of Representatives. James Graham was running for re-election and had declared himself for Martin Van Buren for the presidency in 1836. Newland ran in support of Tennessee Senator Hugh Lawson White. The initial results appeared to show Graham with a narrow seven-vote margin of victory, but Newland presented evidence that ballots had been left out of the count because they had been placed in the wrong ballot box. Newland petitioned the United States House of Representatives to resolve the dispute. The House Committee on Elections, with a Democratic Majority, found in Newland's favor that the misplaced ballots should be added to his total, giving him an apparent victory by 12 votes. However, the issue languished in the House with months of debate. Ultimately, the House voted 114 to 87 that Graham was not elected, however the vote in favor of seating Newland failed 99 to 100 and the seat was declared vacant in March 1836.

A special election was subsequently held in August 1836. By this time, Van Buren was the nominee of the Democrats, and Newland declared himself a supporter. This time Graham won handily, defeating Newland by 1,600 votes.

== Wisconsin ==
In 1837, after the inauguration of Van Buren as President, he appointed Newland a surveyor of public lands in the Wisconsin Territory. Newland moved to Wisconsin and settled near Blue River, in what was then part of Iowa County. At the time, Iowa County encompassed all the land in Wisconsin south of the Wisconsin River and west of the river's major bend.

Newland again became involved with politics and, in June 1840, he was on the Democratic slate of candidates for the Legislative Assembly. He was elected to represent Iowa County for the Third Legislative Assembly (1840–1842). At the first session, he was chosen as Speaker of the House of Representatives and elected on the first ballot. He served in that capacity for both sessions of the Third Assembly.

At the conclusion of the Third Assembly, Newland relocated to Milwaukee, where he was elected to the Fourth Assembly as a member of the Territorial Council (upper chamber). He was a candidate to be a delegate to Wisconsin's first constitutional convention in 1846, but was not elected.

After Wisconsin achieved statehood, Newland went to work in Sheboygan County, and resided at Greenbush. He served on the board of directors of the Sheboygan and Fond du Lac Plank Road Company and, in 1853, was appointed harbor agent at Sheboygan.

== Death ==
Finding himself in difficult financial circumstances, Newland traveled to Washington, D.C., in 1857, in an attempt to obtain an appointment from the new President, James Buchanan. After a few months there without success, on the morning of December 20, 1857, Newland's body was discovered in the canal near 9th Street. His death was ruled an accidental drowning by a Washington, D.C., jury, but it was widely reported as suicide.

== Personal life and family ==
Newland married Cynthia Ann McDonald and had at least two children. Their son, David, died in infancy. Their daughter, Kate, married Jacob Sproat, and, after his death, married John Dawer.

Cynthia Newland was a maternal aunt of famous sculptor Vinnie Ream. After Newland's death, she remarried with Joseph L. Speer of Kansas.

== Electoral history ==
=== U.S. House of Representatives (1833) ===
North Carolina's 12th Congressional District Election, 1833
Party	Candidate	Votes	%	±%
General Election, August 1833
Anti-Jacksonian	James Graham	3,272	41.65%	
Jacksonian	Samuel Price Carson (incumbent)	2,401	30.56%	
Jacksonian	David Newland	2,183	27.79%	
Plurality		871	11.09%	
Total votes		7,856	100.0%	
Anti-Jacksonian gain from Jacksonian				

=== U.S. House of Representatives (1835) ===
North Carolina's 12th Congressional District Election, 1835
Party	Candidate	Votes	%	±%
General Election, August 1835
Anti-Jacksonian	James Graham (incumbent)	3,733	50.05%	
Jacksonian	David Newland	3,726	49.95%	
Plurality		7	0.09%	
Total votes		7,459	100.0%	
Void election result

=== U.S. House of Representatives (1836) ===
North Carolina's 12th Congressional District Special Election, 1836
Party	Candidate	Votes	%	±%
General Election, August 1836
Whig	James Graham	4,086	62.32%	
Democratic	David Newland	2,471	37.68%	
Plurality		1,615	24.63%	
Total votes		6,557	100.0%	
Whig gain from Vacant				
