= Lucius Israel Barber =

American politician (1806–1889)

Lucius I. Barber

Member of the Connecticut House of Representatives from the Simsbury district
- In office May 1, 1850 – May 1, 1852 Serving with James Turnbull
- Preceded by: Salmon C. Eno & Samuel H. Woodruff
- Succeeded by: William Mather & John Turnbull

Member of the Council of the Wisconsin Territory for Dane, Dodge, Green, Jefferson, and Sauk counties
- In office December 5, 1842 – January 6, 1845
- Preceded by: Ebenezer Brigham
- Succeeded by: John Catlin

Speaker of the House of Representatives of the Wisconsin Territory
- In office January 21, 1839 – December 2, 1839
- Preceded by: John Wilford Blackstone Sr.
- Succeeded by: Edward V. Whiton

Member of the House of Representatives of the Wisconsin Territory for Dane, Dodge, Green, and Jefferson counties
- In office November 2, 1840 – December 5, 1842 Serving with Daniel S. Sutherland
- Preceded by: Daniel S. Sutherland
- Succeeded by: Isaac H. Palmer, Lyman Crossman, & Robert Masters

Member of the House of Representatives of the Wisconsin Territory for Milwaukee and Washington counties
- In office November 5, 1838 – December 2, 1839 Serving with William Shew, Henry C. Skinner, Ezekiel Churchill, & Augustus Story
- Preceded by: William B. Sheldon, Madison W. Cornwall, & Charles Durkee
- Succeeded by: William Shew, Augustus Story, Adam E. Ray, Horatio Wells, & William R. Longstreet

Personal details
- Born: October 7, 1806 Simsbury, Connecticut, U.S.
- Died: February 16, 1889 (aged 82) Simsbury, Connecticut, U.S.
- Resting place: Simsbury Cemetery, Simsbury, Connecticut, U.S.
- Party: Whig
- Spouses: Emma Case (died 1871); Abbie Sexton (died 1910)
- Education: Amherst College; University of Pennsylvania Medical College
- Profession: Physician

Lucius Israel Barber (October 7, 1806 – February 16, 1889) was an American medical doctor, Whig politician, and Wisconsin pioneer. He served as Speaker of the House of Representatives of the Wisconsin Territory and later served in the Connecticut House of Representatives. In historical documents his name is sometimes incorrectly given as Lucius J. Barber or L. J. Barber. His last name is also sometimes spelled Barbour.

== Biography ==
Barber was born in Simsbury, Connecticut, on October 7, 1806. He graduated from Amherst College and the University of Pennsylvania Medical College. In 1835, he moved to what would become the Wisconsin Territory, which at that time was part of the Michigan Territory, settling in Milwaukee. In 1839, he moved west to the newly-established Jefferson County, but in 1845 he returned to the state of Connecticut. Barber died on February 16, 1889, in Simsbury, Connecticut.

== Career ==
As a member of the Whig Party, Barber was elected to the Wisconsin Territorial Legislature from 1838 to 1839, representing Milwaukee County, and was chosen as Speaker of the Wisconsin Territorial House of Representatives during the 2nd session of the 2nd Wisconsin Territorial Assembly (1839). After moving to Jefferson County, he was elected to another term in the House of Representatives in 1840, and was then elected to the Wisconsin Territorial Council (upper house), serving from 1842 through 1844.

After moving back to Connecticut, he was elected to the Connecticut House of Representatives in 1850, and served as a probate judge from 1859 through 1869. Barber was also a historian and wrote books about the history of Simsbury, Connecticut. He contributed the Simsbury portion of The Memorial History of Hartford County, Connecticut, 1633–1884 (1889).

== Works ==
- Trumbull, J. Hammond, ed. (1886). "Chapter XXI. Simsbury". The Memorial History of Hartford County, Connecticut, 1633–1884. Vol. 2. Boston, Massachusetts: E. L. Osgood.

Connecticut House of Representatives
Preceded by Salmon C. Eno and Samuel H. Woodruff	Member of the Connecticut House of Representatives from the Simsbury district May 1, 1850 – May 1, 1852; Served alongside: James Turnbull	Succeeded by William Mather and John Turnbull
