= James Russell Vineyard =

19th century American politician

Member of the California Senate from the 2nd district
- In office January 6, 1862 – August 30, 1863
- Preceded by: Pablo de la Guerra
- Succeeded by: Henry Hamilton

Member of the California State Assembly from the 9th district
- In office January 1, 1855 – January 7, 1856

Member of the Wisconsin State Assembly from the Grant 2nd district
- In office January 1, 1849 – January 7, 1850
- Preceded by: Noah Virgin
- Succeeded by: William McGonigal

Member of the Council of the Wisconsin Territory from Grant County
- In office November 26, 1838 – February 11, 1842 Serving with John H. Rountree
- Preceded by: Position established
- Succeeded by: Nelson Dewey

Personal details
- Born: January 16, 1801 Frankfort, Kentucky, U.S.
- Died: August 30, 1863 (aged 62) Los Angeles, California, U.S.
- Party: Democratic

James Russell Vineyard (January 16, 1801 – August 30, 1863) was an American Democratic politician and pioneer. He served in the California State Senate and Assembly, and earlier was a member of the Wisconsin State Assembly, the legislature of the Wisconsin Territory and the 7th Michigan Territorial Council (the so-called "Rump Council"). He was infamous for shooting and killing fellow Wisconsin territorial legislator Charles C. P. Arndt on the floor of the legislature.

== Wisconsin ==
Born in Frankfort, Kentucky, Vineyard settled in Platteville, Wisconsin, in Wisconsin Territory, in the 1840s. During this time, he was elected to the Seventh Michigan Territorial Council for the western area of Michigan Territory; he was then elected to the Wisconsin Territorial Council (the equivalent of the present Wisconsin State Senate). On February 11, 1842, in the course of a heated debate over the appointment of a sheriff for Grant County, Vineyard clashed with Charles C. P. Arndt. After the body was adjourned, Arndt's temper remained heated, he charged Vineyard's desk, and Vineyard shot Arndt dead upon the Council floor. Vineyard had boarded with the Arndt family in Green Bay during the winter of 1835–36, and is reported to have been regarded as almost one of the family; the two men were considered fast friends (even staying at the same boarding house in Madison). Charles Dickens (who had been doing a lecture tour of the United States at the time of the incident) described the attack as an example of the violent depravity of American culture in his American Notes for General Circulation.

He was tried for and acquitted of murder and later served in the first Wisconsin Constitutional Convention of 1846 and was elected to the Wisconsin State Assembly in 1848 for one term.

== California ==
In 1850, he moved to California to join the Gold Rush. He settled in Sacramento, California, where he was an Indian agent. There he was elected to the California State Assembly in 1854. In 1861, he moved to Los Angeles, California.

On May 7, 1861, Vineyard, Californio land magnate and former state senator Andrés Pico, and a partner won permission to make a deep slot-like road cut in the pass between the San Gabriel Mountains and the Santa Susana Mountains ranges, making what would become known as the Beale's Cut Stagecoach Pass or San Fernando Pass. The State of California awarded them a twenty-year contract to maintain the turnpike and collect tolls. A landowner and surveyor named Edward Beale was appointed by newly elected President Abraham Lincoln as the federal Surveyor General of California and Nevada. Beale challenged Pico's loyalty to the new president and in 1863, Beale was awarded the right to collect the toll in the pass.

Vineyard was elected to the California State Senate from Los Angeles County in 1861, and died in office before the next general election (at 58 he was now the oldest member of the Legislature).

== Death ==
He died in Los Angeles on August 30, 1863.
