= Lorenzo Janes =

American judge

Lorenzo Janes (September 18, 1801 – June 25, 1873) was an American lawyer, judge, businessman, and territorial legislator.

Born in Washington County, Vermont, Janes went to school in Montpelier, Vermont. He studied law and was admitted to the New York bar in 1828. Janes practiced law in Albany, New York. He then was named a judge to the Albany Justices Court in 1833. In 1836, Janes moved to Racine, Wisconsin Territory and continued to practice law. He was also involved in the real estate and insurance business in Racine. Janes was one of the editors of the Racine Argus newspaper. Janes served in the Wisconsin Territorial Council from 1839 to 1842. He also served as a colonel on the military staff of Wisconsin Territorial Governors Henry Dodge and James D. Doty.

He was a co-founder and active member of the First Baptist Church of Racine. His son, David G. Janes, succeeded in control of his business affairs, and was later elected Mayor of Racine. Another son, George S. Janes, died in the American Civil War.
