= James Collins (Wisconsin and California politician) =

American politician

James Collins (1802- July 18, 1864), often called "Col. Collins", served in the legislatures of the Wisconsin Territory and in the California State Assembly.

A native of Virginia, he lived at different times in Macoupin County, Illinois, and in White Oak Springs, Wisconsin Territory. In 1845, he was the Whig nominee for non-voting delegate to the Twenty-ninth Congress to represent the Wisconsin Territory; he lost to Morgan Lewis Martin, with 5,787 to Martin's 6,803 and 790 for Edward D. Holton of the Liberty Party.

In 1849, Collins went to California and settled in Nevada County, California, from which he was elected to the California Assembly for two terms (1862 and 1863), was commissioned a brigadier general of the state militia, and was elected county treasurer. He died there in 1864.
