= Thomas Jenkins (Wisconsin politician, born 1801) =

American politician

Thomas Jenkins (1801–1866) was a member of the Wisconsin State Assembly.

== Biography ==
Jenkins was born in March 1801. Later, he settled in what is now Dodgeville, Wisconsin (at the time part of Michigan Territory). During the Black Hawk War, Jenkins fought under the command of Henry Dodge. He was wounded in the hip during the Battle of Horseshoe Bend (1832). Jenkins died in 1866.

== Political career ==
Jenkins was a member of the Assembly in 1848. Previously, he had been a member of the Legislature of the Wisconsin Territory and a delegate to the constitutional convention to write the Constitution of Wisconsin. He was a Democrat.
