= List of places named for Lewis Cass =

This is a list of places in the United States named for Lewis Cass:

== Counties ==
- Cass County, Illinois
- Cass County, Indiana
- Cass County, Iowa
- Cass County, Michigan
- Cass County, Minnesota
- Cass County, Missouri
- Cass County, Nebraska
- Cass County, Texas

In addition, Bartow County, Georgia was formerly Cass County, until after the American Civil War. (Cass County, North Dakota is not named for Lewis Cass but for railroad executive George Washington Cass.)

== Cities, towns, or villages ==
- Cass, West Virginia
- Cass City, Michigan
- Cass Lake, Minnesota
- Cassopolis, Michigan
- Casstown, Ohio
- Cassville, Georgia, formerly the county seat of Bartow County, Georgia, which was formerly Cass County, Georgia, until after the American Civil War
- Cassville, Missouri
- Cassville, New Jersey
- Cassville, Pennsylvania
- Cassville, Wisconsin
- Cassville, New York

== Townships ==
- Cass Township, Illinois, Fulton County, Illinois
- Cass Township, Clay County, Indiana
- Cass Township, Dubois County, Indiana
- Cass Township, Greene County, Indiana
- Cass Township, LaPorte County, Indiana
- Cass Township, Ohio County, Indiana
- Cass Township, Pulaski County, Indiana
- Cass Township, Sullivan County, Indiana
- Cass Township, White County, Indiana
- Cass Township, Boone County, Iowa
- Cass Township, Cass County, Iowa
- Cass Township, Cedar County, Iowa
- Cass Township, Clayton County, Iowa
- Cass Township, Guthrie County, Iowa
- Cass Township, Hamilton County, Iowa
- Cass Township, Harrison County, Iowa
- Cass Township, Jones County, Iowa
- Cass Township, Shelby County, Iowa
- Cass Township, Wapello County, Iowa
- Cass Township, Douglas County, Missouri
- Cass Township, Greene County, Missouri
- Cass Township, Stone County, Missouri
- Cass Township, Texas County, Missouri
- Cass Township, Hancock County, Ohio
- Cass Township, Muskingum County, Ohio
- Cass Township, Richland County, Ohio
- Cass Township, Oklahoma, Oklahoma County, Oklahoma
- Cass Township, Huntingdon County, Pennsylvania
- Cass Township, Schuylkill County, Pennsylvania
- Cassville (town), Wisconsin

== Geographical features ==
- Cass Lake (Minnesota)
- Cass Lake (Michigan)
- Cass River, Michigan

== Buildings ==
- Lewis Cass Technical High School, Detroit, Michigan
- Lewis Cass Jr. Sr High School, Walton, Indiana
- Lewis Cass Elementary School, Livonia, Michigan

Note: The Elliott-Larsen Building in Lansing, Michigan had been named for Lewis Cass until 2020, when Michigan Governor Gretchen Whitmer renamed the building for two Michigan civil rights pioneers, rather than Cass, a slaveholder who supported the expansion of slavery and expulsion of Native Americans from their lands.

== Other ==
- Cass Corridor, Detroit, Michigan
- Cass Park and Cass Park Historic District, Detroit, Michigan
- Cass-Davenport Historic District, Detroit, Michigan
- Center Cass School District #66, Downers Grove, Illinois
- Cass Cliff, Mackinac Island, Michigan
- Fort Cass

Note: Southwest Heritage Intermediate School District in Cass County, Michigan had been named Cass County ISD until 2021. The school board renamed the district after a historical reevaluation of namesake Lewis Cass.

== Streets ==
- Cass Street, Exeter, New Hampshire
- Cass Place, Walnut Park, California
- Cass Avenue, Bay City, Michigan
- Cass Avenue, Grand Rapids, Michigan
- Cass Avenue, Detroit, Michigan
- Cass Avenue, Macomb County, Michigan
- Cass Street, Portsmouth, New Hampshire
- Cass Street, San Diego, California
- Cass Street, Omaha, Nebraska
- Cass Street, Milwaukee, Wisconsin
- Cass Avenue, St. Louis, Missouri
- Cass Street, Albion, Michigan
- Cass Street, Dresden, Ohio
- Cass Street, La Crosse, Wisconsin
- Cass Street in Traverse City, Michigan and in Cadillac, Michigan
