= Cass Township =

Cass Township may refer to:

== Illinois ==
- Cass Township, Fulton County, Illinois

== Indiana ==
- Cass Township, Clay County, Indiana
- Cass Township, Dubois County, Indiana
- Cass Township, Greene County, Indiana
- Cass Township, LaPorte County, Indiana
- Cass Township, Ohio County, Indiana
- Cass Township, Pulaski County, Indiana
- Cass Township, Sullivan County, Indiana
- Cass Township, White County, Indiana

== Iowa ==
- Cass Township, Boone County, Iowa
- Cass Township, Cass County, Iowa
- Cass Township, Cedar County, Iowa
- Cass Township, Clayton County, Iowa
- Cass Township, Guthrie County, Iowa
- Cass Township, Hamilton County, Iowa
- Cass Township, Harrison County, Iowa
- Cass Township, Jones County, Iowa
- Cass Township, Shelby County, Iowa
- Cass Township, Wapello County, Iowa

== Missouri ==
- Cass Township, Douglas County, Missouri, in Douglas County, Missouri
- Cass Township, Greene County, Missouri
- Cass Township, Stone County, Missouri, in Stone County, Missouri
- Cass Township, Texas County, Missouri

== Ohio ==
- Cass Township, Hancock County, Ohio
- Cass Township, Muskingum County, Ohio
- Cass Township, Richland County, Ohio

== Pennsylvania ==
- Cass Township, Huntingdon County, Pennsylvania
- Cass Township, Schuylkill County, Pennsylvania
