= Cassville =

Cassville may refer to several places in the United States:

- Cassville, Georgia
- Cassville, Indiana
- Cassville, Missouri
- Cassville, New York
- Cassville, Pennsylvania
- Cassville, West Virginia
- Cassville, Wisconsin, village
- Cassville (town), Wisconsin

== See also ==
- List of places named for Lewis Cass
