= Cass Township, Pennsylvania =

Cass Township is the name of the following places in the U.S. state of Pennsylvania:

- Cass Township, Huntingdon County, Pennsylvania
- Cass Township, Schuylkill County, Pennsylvania

== See also ==
- Cass Township (disambiguation)
