= Alexander L. Collins =

American pioneer, first Governor of Wisconsin

The Honorable Alexander L. Collins
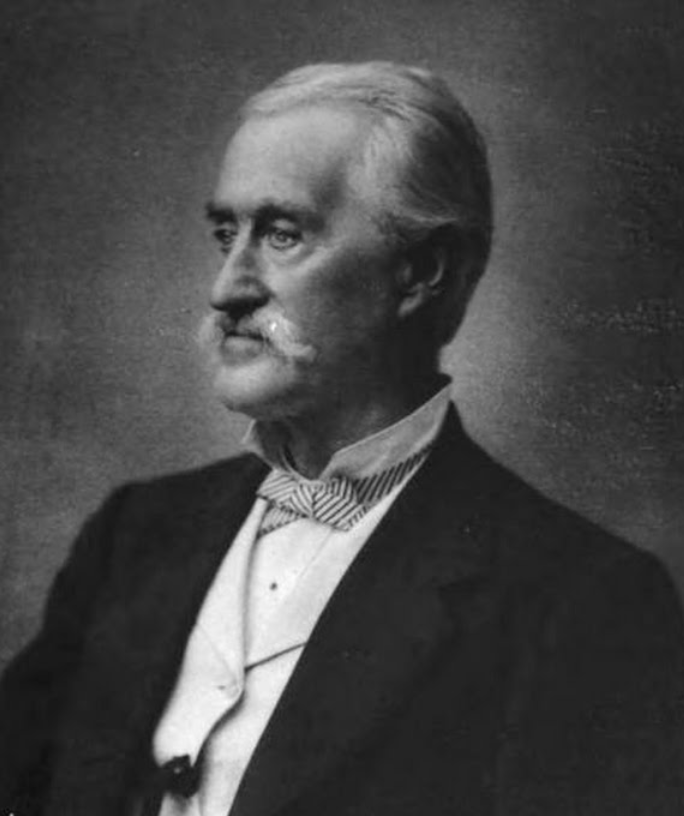

Wisconsin Circuit Court Judge for the 9th Circuit
- In office January 1, 1856 – September 5, 1858
- Preceded by: Position Established
- Succeeded by: Luther S. Dixon

Chairman of the Whig Party of Wisconsin
- In office 1852–1854

2nd Village President of Madison, Wisconsin
- In office 1847–1850
- Preceded by: Thomas W. Sutherland
- Succeeded by: William N. Seymour

Member of the Council of the Wisconsin Territory for Dane, Green, and Sauk counties
- In office January 4, 1847 – May 29, 1848
- Preceded by: John Catlin
- Succeeded by: Position Abolished

Personal details
- Born: Alexander Lynn Collins; March 17, 1812 Whitestown, New York
- Died: October 31, 1901 (aged 89) Neenah, Wisconsin
- Party: Whig
- Spouse: Sarah Heaton Huggins
- Children: Alexander W. Collins^{(b. 1836; died 1916)}; 2 other sons; Jessie Wingate (McCord)^{(b. 1839; died 1932)}; Charlotte Abernathy (Ilsley)^{(b. 1841; died 1917)}; Caroline B. (Brooks)
- Parents: Oliver Collins (father); Catharine (Kellogg) Collins (mother)
- Relatives: Ela Collins (half-brother); Sarah C. (Doty) (half-sister); Catherine Frances (White) (half-sister)
- Occupation: lawyer, judge

Alexander Lynn Collins (March 17, 1812 – October 31, 1901) was an American lawyer, judge, and politician. He was an important leader of the Whig Party in the early years of Wisconsin, serving as party chairman, nominee for United States Congress, for United States Senate, and for Governor of Wisconsin. He also served as a Wisconsin Circuit Court Judge and a member of the University of Wisconsin Board of Regents. In historical documents, his middle name is sometimes spelled "Linn" and he is sometimes referred to as "A. L. Collins."

== Early life and education ==
Alexander L. Collins was born in Whitestown, New York, to Oliver Collins and his fourth wife, Catharine (Kellogg) Collins. His father was a farmer and had been a volunteer in the Continental Army during the American Revolutionary War. Oliver Collins rose to the rank of Brigadier General with the New York militia during the War of 1812. Alexander was the tenth of twelve children fathered by Oliver Collins.

At the age of 19, he began studying law in the office of Storrs and White, in Whitesboro, New York. In 1833, at age 21, he moved to Cleveland, Ohio, and continued his legal studies. He was admitted to the State Bar in 1835, at the Supreme Court of Ohio.

== Wisconsin politics ==
Collins practiced law in Cleveland for several years, then moved to the Wisconsin Territory in 1842, settling in Madison. He continued his law practice there, first establishing a brief partnership with Thomas W. Sutherland, who had been the United States Attorney for the Wisconsin Territory. He soon moved into a longer-term legal partnership with George Baldwin Smith, and, after 1853, with Elisha W. Keyes, through which Collins became a prominent and well-respected lawyer in the state. Some of his siblings also relocated to Wisconsin—his older sister, Sarah, was the wife of Wisconsin Territorial Governor James Duane Doty.

In 1846, Collins was elected to his first public office when he was chosen to represent Dane, Green, and Sauk counties on the Territorial Council. He served on the council until its dissolution, at the time Wisconsin became a state.

In Wisconsin's first election for voting members of Congress, Collins was the Whig Party's candidate in the 2nd Congressional district. He was defeated in that election by Democrat Mason C. Darling. After the seating of the 1st Wisconsin Legislature, Collins stood, along with Edward V. Whiton, as Whig candidates for United States Senate—U.S. senators at the time were elected by the state legislature, rather than through popular election. The Democratic Party had a clear majority in the Legislature, thus Collins and Whiton were defeated by the Democratic Party ticket of Henry Dodge and Isaac P. Walker. Later that year, Collins was appointed to the first board of regents of the University of Wisconsin. Whiton went on to serve on the Wisconsin Circuit Court and later became the first chief justice of the Wisconsin Supreme Court.

The following year, in 1849, Collins was the Whig Party's nominee in the 2nd Wisconsin gubernatorial election, running against incumbent governor Nelson Dewey. Collins was defeated and Dewey went on to another term as governor. Two years later, in 1851, Collins was, again, the Whig nominee for United States Senator, running against incumbent Democrat Henry Dodge. The Democratic Party still held a significant majority in the 1851 legislature, thus re-elected Dodge.

In 1852, Collins became chairman of the Whig Party in Wisconsin and served as a delegate to the 1852 Whig National Convention, in Baltimore. The 1852 convention would turn out to be the last Whig National Convention. At the convention, Collins was a strong supporter of Daniel Webster, who had been supportive of the Compromise of 1850 and associated with the enforcement of the Fugitive Slave Act of 1850. When the convention chose General Winfield Scott as its nominee, Collins left in disgust.

As the Whig Party dissolved into the newly forming Republican Party, Collins became briefly associated with the Democratic Party. In 1855, with the support of the Democratic Party, he was elected Circuit Court Judge for the newly created 9th Circuit. He had to resign a few years later, in the fall of 1858, due to health problems.

== Later years ==
After leaving the court, he went into the land business with his brother-in-law, former Territorial Governor James D. Doty, in Menasha, Wisconsin. At the start of the American Civil War, their business faltered, and in 1864, Collins traveled to California for health and recreation. In 1867, he returned to Wisconsin. In 1874, he resumed his law practice in Appleton, Wisconsin.

== Death ==
In his later years, Judge Collins resided with his son, Alexander, Jr., in Neenah, Wisconsin, and his daughter, Mrs. Jessie McCord, in Milwaukee. He died in Neenah on October 31, 1901.

== Electoral history ==
=== United States House of Representatives (1848) ===
Wisconsin's 2nd Congressional District Special Election, 1848
Party	Candidate	Votes	%	±%
Special Election, May 8, 1848
Democratic	Mason C. Darling	9,683	58.62%	
Whig	Alexander L. Collins	6,836	41.38%	
Plurality		2,847	17.23%	
Total votes		16,519	100.0%	
Democratic win (new seat)				

=== United States Senate (1848) ===
United States Senate election in Wisconsin, 1848
Party	Candidate	Votes	%	±%
Vote of the 1st Wisconsin Legislature, June 8, 1848
Democratic	Isaac P. Walker	61	38.61%	
Democratic	Henry Dodge	60	37.97%	
Whig	Alexander L. Collins	18	11.39%	
Whig	Edward V. Whiton	17	10.76%	
Whig	William S. Hamilton	1	0.63%	
Whig	John Hubbard Tweedy	1	0.63%	
Total votes		'158'	'100.0%'	
Democratic win (new seat)				
Democratic win (new seat)				

=== Wisconsin Governor (1849) ===
Wisconsin Gubernatorial Election, 1849
Party	Candidate	Votes	%	±%
General Election, November 6, 1849
Democratic	Nelson Dewey (incumbent)	16,649	52.42%	
Whig	Alexander L. Collins	11,317	35.63%	
Free Soil	Warren Chase	3,761	11.84%	
	Scattering	32	0.10%	
Total votes		'31,759'	'100.0%'	
Democratic hold				

=== United States Senate (1851) ===
United States Senate election in Wisconsin, 1851
Party	Candidate	Votes	%	±%
Vote of the 4th Wisconsin Legislature, January 20, 1851
Democratic	Henry Dodge (incumbent)	69	83.13%	
Whig	James Duane Doty	7	8.43%	
Whig	Alexander L. Collins	3	3.61%	
Whig	Rufus King	2	2.41%	
Free Soil	Warren Chase	1	1.20%	
	John B. Terry	1	1.20%	
Total votes		'83'	'100.0%'	
Democratic hold				

Party political offices
Preceded by John Hubbard Tweedy	Whig nominee for Governor of Wisconsin; 1849	Succeeded by Leonard J. Farwell
Political offices
Preceded by Thomas W. Sutherland	Village President of Madison, Wisconsin; 1847 – 1850	Succeeded by William N. Seymour
Legal offices
Preceded by Position established	Wisconsin Circuit Court Judge for the 9th Circuit; 1856 – 1858	Succeeded by Luther S. Dixon
