= Governor Dewey =

Governor Dewey may refer to:

- Nelson Dewey (1813–1889), 1st Governor of Wisconsin
- Thomas E. Dewey (1902–1971), 47th Governor of New York
