= 1851 Wisconsin gubernatorial election =

- November 4, 1851
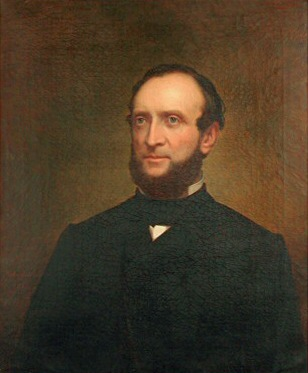

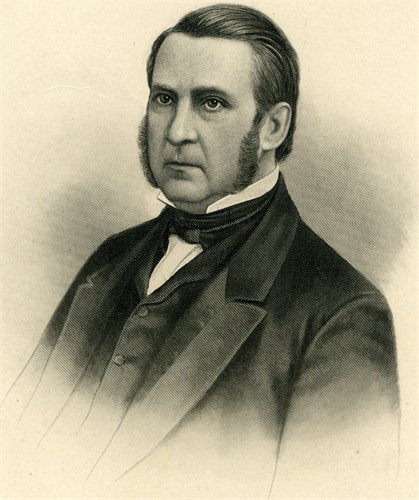
Nominee	Leonard J. Farwell	Don A. J. Upham
Party	Whig	Democratic
Popular vote	22,319	21,812
Percentage	50.51%	49.36%
- County results Farwell: 50–60% 60–70% Upham: 50–60% 60–70% 70–80%
Governor before election
Nelson Dewey
Democratic
Elected Governor
Leonard J. Farwell
Whig

The 1851 Wisconsin gubernatorial election was held on November 4, 1851. Whig candidate Leonard J. Farwell won the election with 51% of the vote, winning his first term as Governor of Wisconsin. Farwell defeated Democratic candidate Don A. J. Upham.

== Democratic Party ==
Don A. J. Upham had been Mayor of Milwaukee for two years just prior to his run for governor. Before that, he had served extensively in the government of the Wisconsin Territory prior to statehood—as a member of the Council (upper chamber of the legislature) and as President of the first Constitutional Convention.

== Whig Party ==
Leonard J. Farwell owned a considerable amount of land in the Madison area and had invested in improvements. He had been active in establishing the Wisconsin Historical Society, the state agricultural society, the state public school system, and the state university.

== Results ==
1851 Wisconsin gubernatorial election
Party	Candidate	Votes	%	±%
Whig	Leonard J. Farwell	22,319	50.51%	+14.87%
Democratic	Don A. J. Upham	21,812	49.36%	−3.06%
	Scattering	59	0.13%	
Majority		507	1.15%	
Total votes		44,190	100.00%	
Whig gain from Democratic		Swing	+17.94%	

=== Results by county ===
County	Don A. J. Upham Democratic		Leonard J. Farwell Whig		Scattering Write-in		Margin		Total votes cast
County	#	%	#	%	#	%	#	%	Total votes cast
Bad Ax	52	37.68%	86	62.32%	0	0.00%	-34	-24.64%	138
Brown	299	47.84%	318	50.88%	8	1.28%	-19	-3.04%	625
Calumet	63	32.64%	129	66.84%	1	0.52%	-66	-34.20%	193
Columbia	714	49.14%	738	50.79%	1	0.07%	-24	-1.65%	1,453
Crawford	48	28.07%	123	71.93%	0	0.00%	-75	-43.86%	171
Dane	1,454	58.14%	1,047	41.86%	0	0.00%	407	16.27%	2,501
Dodge	1,302	48.17%	1,401	51.83%	0	0.00%	-99	-3.66%	2,703
Fond du Lac	877	50.32%	865	49.63%	1	0.06%	12	0.69%	1,743
Grant	1,026	51.02%	985	48.98%	0	0.00%	41	2.04%	2,011
Green	504	48.74%	530	51.26%	0	0.00%	-26	-2.51%	1,034
Iowa	659	49.25%	679	50.75%	0	0.00%	-20	-1.49%	1,338
Jefferson	1,121	49.21%	1,152	50.57%	5	0.22%	-31	-1.36%	2,278
Kenosha	809	68.73%	367	31.18%	1	0.08%	442	37.55%	1,177
La Crosse	68	23.69%	219	76.31%	0	0.00%	-151	-52.61%	287
Lafayette	467	39.61%	712	60.39%	0	0.00%	-245	-20.78%	1,179
Manitowoc	93	22.04%	328	77.73%	1	0.24%	-235	-55.69%	422
Marathon	113	54.33%	95	45.67%	0	0.00%	18	8.65%	208
Marquette	681	48.54%	722	51.46%	0	0.00%	-41	-2.92%	1,403
Milwaukee	2,554	51.82%	2,373	48.14%	2	0.04%	181	3.67%	4,929
Outagamie	216	40.75%	314	59.25%	0	0.00%	-98	-18.49%	530
Portage	142	42.90%	189	57.10%	0	0.00%	-47	-14.20%	331
Racine	1,087	60.02%	716	39.54%	8	0.44%	371	20.49%	1,811
Richland	117	45.88%	136	53.33%	2	0.78%	-19	-7.45%	255
Rock	1,771	60.71%	1,141	39.12%	5	0.17%	630	21.60%	2,917
Sauk	474	49.12%	490	50.78%	1	0.10%	-16	-1.66%	965
Sheboygan	552	35.32%	1,010	64.62%	1	0.06%	-458	-29.30%	1,563
St. Croix	78	43.58%	100	55.87%	1	0.56%	-22	-12.29%	179
Walworth	1,641	65.67%	858	34.33%	0	0.00%	783	31.33%	2,499
Washington	520	22.65%	1,760	76.66%	16	0.70%	-1,240	-54.01%	2,296
Waukesha	1,541	50.56%	1,507	49.44%	0	0.00%	34	1.12%	3,048
Waupaca	58	45.67%	66	51.97%	3	2.36%	-8	-6.30%	127
Waushara	195	68.90%	86	30.39%	2	0.71%	109	38.52%	283
Winnebago	1,023	64.22%	570	35.78%	0	0.00%	453	28.44%	1,593
Total	22,319	50.51%	21,812	49.36%	59	0.13%	507	1.15%	44,190

==== Counties that flipped from Democratic to Whig ====
- Fond du Lac
- Milwaukee
- Waukesha

==== Counties that flipped from Free Soil to Whig ====
- Racine
- Walworth

==== Counties that flipped from Whig to Democratic ====
- Columbia
