= 1849 Wisconsin gubernatorial election =

- November 6, 1849
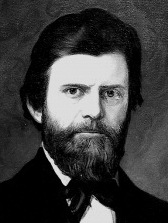

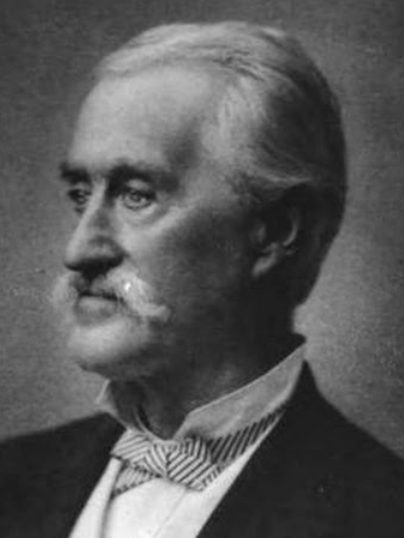

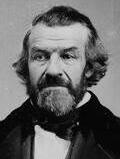
Nominee	Nelson Dewey	Alexander L. Collins	Warren Chase
Party	Democratic	Whig	Free Soil
Popular vote	16,649	11,317	3,761
Percentage	52.42%	35.63%	11.84%
- County results Dewey: 50–60% 60–70% 70–80% Collins: 40–50% 50–60% Chase: 30–40%
Governor before election
Nelson Dewey
Democratic
Elected Governor
Nelson Dewey
Democratic

The 1849 Wisconsin gubernatorial election was held on November 6, 1849. Democrat Nelson Dewey won the election with 52% of the vote, winning his second term as Governor of Wisconsin. Dewey defeated Whig Party candidate Alexander L. Collins and Free Soil Party candidate Warren Chase.

This was the second Wisconsin gubernatorial election, and the first election for a full two-year gubernatorial term.

== Nominations ==
=== Democratic party ===
Nelson Dewey was the incumbent governor, having been elected in the 1848 election. He was a prominent lawyer and real-estate investor in Grant County, Wisconsin. He did extensive business with the lead-mining industry, which was a major component of the economy of the Wisconsin Territory. He had been a member of nearly every session of the Wisconsin Territorial Legislature, first as a member of the Territorial Assembly, from 1838 to 1842, then as a member of the Territorial Council from 1842 to 1846. He served as Speaker of the Territorial Assembly in 1840, and President of the Territorial Council in 1846.

==== Other candidates ====
Although Dewey was renominated on the first ballot, two other names were placed in candidacy for the Democratic gubernatorial nomination at the 1849 State Democratic Convention, held in Madison:

- Harrison Carroll Hobart, of Sheboygan, was a state senator and prominent lawyer. He had also served in the Wisconsin Territorial House of Representatives.
- William Rudolph Smith, of Mineral Point, had been a colonel in the War of 1812 and served in the Pennsylvania General Assembly before moving to the Wisconsin Territory. In Wisconsin, he negotiated an important treaty with the Chippewa, obtaining a portion of their land, and had been a delegate to Wisconsin's first constitutional convention.

==== Nomination ====
1849 Wisconsin Democratic convention
Party	Candidate	Votes	%
Vote of the Wisconsin Democratic Convention, September 6, 1849
Democratic	Nelson Dewey (incumbent)	37	58.73%
Democratic	Harrison Carroll Hobart	13	20.63%
Democratic	William Rudolph Smith	11	17.46%
	Blank	1	1.59%
Plurality		24	38.09%
Total votes		63	100.0%

=== Whig party ===
Alexander L. Collins was a prominent lawyer in Madison. At the time of the 1849 election, he was a member of the first Board of Regents of the University of Wisconsin. He had been the Whig Party candidate for United States Congress in the 2nd congressional district in 1848. He also served in the Wisconsin Territorial Legislature from 1846 until the territorial government was replaced by the state government in 1848.

=== Free Soil party ===
Warren Chase was, at the time of the 1849 election, a member of the Wisconsin State Senate, having been elected on the Democratic Party ticket in 1848. He represented Fond du Lac and Winnebago counties. Chase was an abolitionist and temperance advocate, and was one of only three delegates to attend both the first and second Wisconsin constitutional conventions. Chase was also notable for his fourierist beliefs, having participated in the founding of the Wisconsin phalanx (commune) at Ceresco, Wisconsin.

== Results ==
Wisconsin Gubernatorial Election, 1849
Party	Candidate	Votes	%	±%
Democratic	Nelson Dewey (incumbent)	16,649	52.42%	−3.20pp
Whig	Alexander L. Collins	11,317	35.63%	−5.50pp
Free Soil	Warren Chase	3,761	11.84%	
	Scattering	32	0.10%	
Plurality		5,332	16.79%	+2.3pp
Total votes		31,759	100.00%	-9.58%
Democratic hold				

=== Results by county ===
County	Nelson Dewey Democratic		Alexander L. Collins Whig		Warren Chase Free Soil		Scattering Write-in		Margin		Total votes cast
County	#	%	#	%	#	%	#	%	#	%	Total votes cast
Brown	281	61.76%	171	37.58%	3	0.66%	0	0.00%	110	24.18%	455
Calumet	135	53.36%	117	46.25%	1	0.40%	0	0.00%	18	7.11%	253
Columbia	410	47.79%	432	50.35%	16	1.86%	0	0.00%	-22	-2.56%	858
Crawford	152	82.61%	32	17.39%	0	0.00%	0	0.00%	120	65.22%	184
Dane	666	43.67%	759	49.77%	86	5.64%	14	0.92%	-93	-6.10%	1,525
Dodge	1,255	60.31%	714	34.31%	112	5.38%	0	0.00%	541	26.00%	2,081
Fond du Lac	640	51.24%	389	31.14%	220	17.61%	0	0.00%	251	20.10%	1,249
Grant	1,030	47.93%	1,103	51.33%	16	0.74%	0	0.00%	-73	-3.40%	2,149
Green	443	55.38%	324	40.50%	26	3.25%	7	0.88%	119	14.88%	800
Iowa	688	51.00%	655	48.55%	6	0.44%	0	0.00%	33	2.45%	1,349
Jefferson	897	52.58%	649	38.04%	158	9.26%	2	0.12%	248	14.54%	1,706
Lafayette	1,094	72.45%	416	27.55%	0	0.00%	0	0.00%	678	44.90%	1,510
Marquette	259	40.72%	247	38.84%	130	20.44%	0	0.00%	12	1.89%	636
Milwaukee	2,108	71.05%	718	24.20%	141	4.75%	0	0.00%	1,390	46.85%	2,967
Portage	287	52.47%	259	47.35%	1	0.18%	0	0.00%	28	5.12%	547
Racine	761	32.03%	716	30.13%	899	37.84%	0	0.00%	-138	-5.81%	2,376
Rock	604	26.11%	1,168	50.50%	541	23.39%	0	0.00%	-564	-24.38%	2,313
Sauk	355	60.79%	226	38.70%	3	0.51%	0	0.00%	129	22.09%	584
Sheboygan	635	65.87%	322	33.40%	7	0.73%	0	0.00%	313	32.47%	964
St. Croix	56	70.89%	21	26.58%	0	0.00%	2	2.53%	35	44.30%	79
Walworth	646	30.44%	667	31.43%	806	37.98%	3	0.14%	-139 (Note: Chase's margin over Collins)	-6.54%	2,122
Washington	1,610	84.38%	208	10.90%	86	4.51%	4	0.21%	1,402	73.48%	1,908
Waukesha	1,319	55.94%	669	28.37%	370	15.69%	0	0.00%	650	27.57%	2,358
Winnebago	318	40.46%	335	42.62%	133	16.92%	0	0.00%	-17	-2.16%	786
Total	16,649	52.42%	11,317	35.63%	3,761	11.84%	32	0.10%	5,332	16.79%	31,759

==== Counties that flipped from Whig to Democratic ====
- Marquette

==== Counties that flipped from Democratic to Whig ====
- Dane

==== Counties that flipped from Democratic to Free Soil ====
- Racine
- Walworth
