= Cassville Municipal Airport =

Airport in Wisconsin, United States

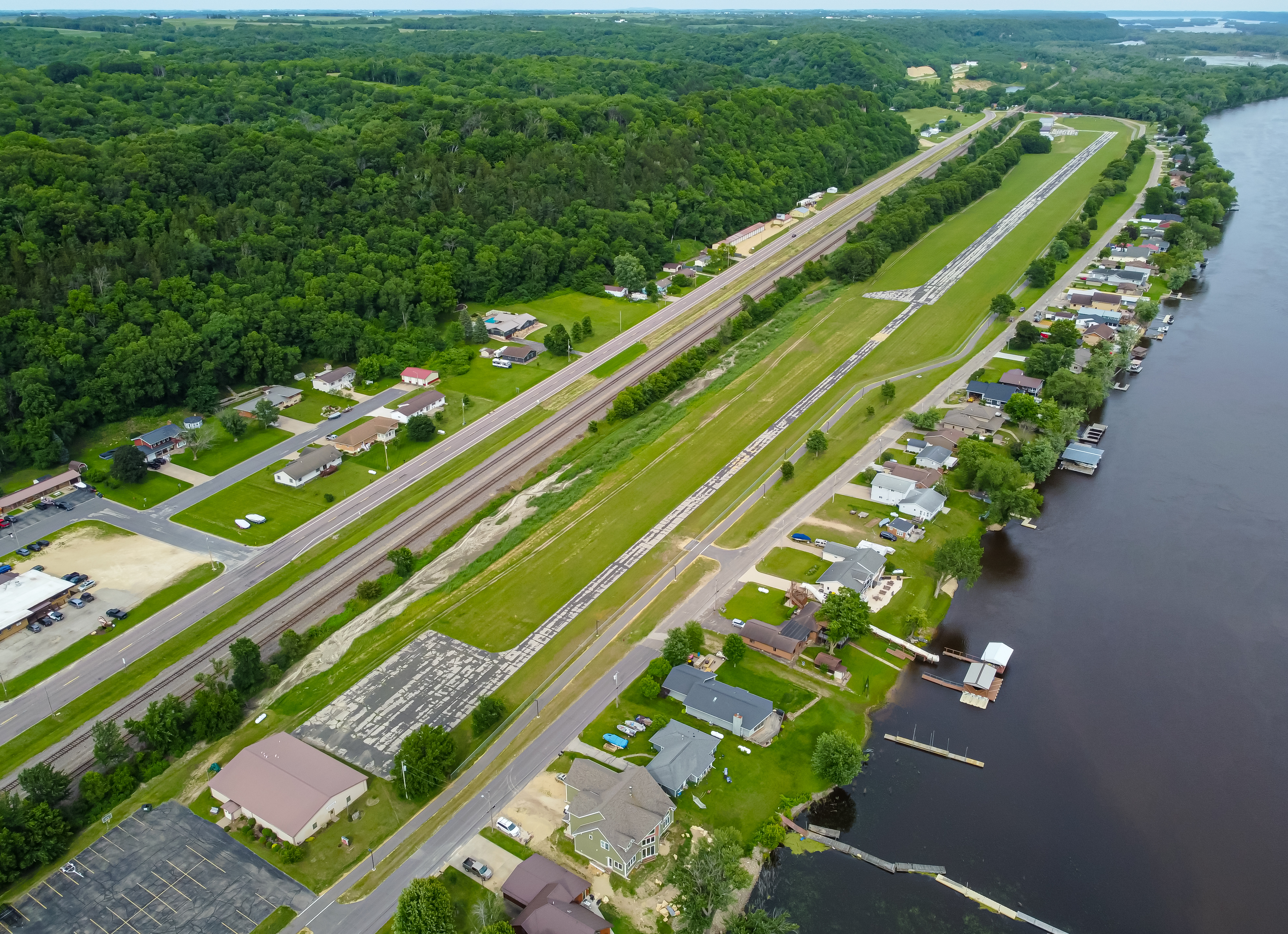
- IATA: none; ICAO: none; FAA LID: C74

Summary
- Airport type: Public
- Owner: Village of Cassville
- Serves: Cassville, Wisconsin
- Opened: September 1951
- Time zone: CST (UTC−06:00)
  - Summer (DST): CDT (UTC−05:00)
- Elevation AMSL: 627 ft / 191 m
- Coordinates: 42°42′15″N 090°57′58″W

Map
- Location of airport in Wisconsin C74 (the United States)

Runways
Direction	Length		Surface
Direction	ft	m	Surface
11/29	3,000	914	Asphalt

Statistics
- Aircraft operations (2024): 2,132
- Based aircraft (2024): 8

Cassville Municipal Airport is a public use airport located approximately one nautical mile southeast of Cassville, Wisconsin, United States, along the banks of the Mississippi River. The field elevation is 627 feet above mean sea level and the FAA location identifier is C74.

The airport is owned by the Village of Cassville.

Cassville Municipal Airport covers an area of 60 acres (24 ha). The airport has a single asphalt runway, designated 11/29, 3,000 feet long by 50 feet wide. As of August 2023, the runway surface was reported to be in poor condition, with numerous cracks and vegetation growing on the entire pavement length.

For the 12-month period ending May 22, 2024, the airport had 2,132 aircraft operations, an average of 41 per week: 75% of the traffic being local general aviation, 24% transient general aviation and 1% air taxi operations.

In July 2024, there were 8 aircraft based at this airport: 7 single-engine aircraft and 1 ultra-light.

== See also ==
- List of airports in Wisconsin
