= E. J. Stoneman Generating Station =

- Country: United States
- Location: Cassville, Wisconsin
- Coordinates: 42°42′30″N 90°59′05″W
- Status: Decommissioned
- Commission date: 2 units, 1952
- Decommission date: 2015
- Owner: DTE Energy Services

Thermal power station
- Primary fuel: Wood waste
- Cooling source: Mississippi River

Power generation
- Nameplate capacity: 40 MW

E. J. Stoneman Generating Station was an electrical power station located in Cassville in Grant County, Wisconsin. It was originally a coal-fired facility for several decades and a biomass facility for 5 years.

== History ==
In 1950, the E.J. Stoneman generating station (“Stoneman”) was built and placed into service by Dairyland Power Cooperative ("Dairyland"). The plant was named after Erle Stoneman, a director of Grant Electric Cooperative and an original incorporator of Dairyland. In 1993, E.J. Stoneman was closed due to economic reasons. In 1996, Dairyland sold the mothballed Stoneman plant to Mid-American Power, an Arkansas-based subsidiary of WPS Resources, and put Stoneman back into operation. In 2007, WPS Resources merged with a group of Illinois natural gas utilities, forming Integrys Energy. In 2008, Integrys sold Stoneman to DTE Stoneman, LLC, a non-utility subsidiary of DTE Energy. One week later, Dairyland Power announced an agreement to purchase the facility’s entire 40 MW net output from DTE upon conversion to a biomass-burning plant.

Between 2008 and 2010, Stoneman was converted by facility owner DTE Energy Services from a 100% coal-burning to a 100% woody biomass-burning plant. Commercial operation of the 40 MW biomass facility began on October 8, 2010. Renewable energy from the DTE Stoneman plant powered up to 30,000 homes served by the Dairyland system.

In 2013, the renewable energy facility was fined $150,000 by the state of Wisconsin for numerous violations of the facility air pollution control permit. In 2015, it was announced that Stoneman would close by the end of the year following the termination of a power purchasing agreement with Dairyland Coop. During the five-year period of biomass operation, neighbors had also complained of charcoal-like soot residue on their homes and vehicles. DTE cited economic conditions as the reason for the closure rather than the failure of biomass electrical generation in general. Low natural gas prices benefiting competitors and high transportation costs for biomass fuel were cited as reasons for closure.

== Environment ==
Stoneman's Electrostatic Precipitator (“ESP”) was upgraded during the conversion from a coal plant to a wood-fired biomass facility. The modifications to the ESP allow the system to collect more particulate and work more efficiently. A Selective non-catalytic reduction (“SNCR”) system was also installed to reduce NOx emissions. A continuous emission monitoring system automatically records data that are used for reports to regulatory agencies. All received fuel is screened; all fuel must comply with strict regulations. Monthly composite samples are sent to a third-party lab for testing and analytics. Although the plant was said to be in compliance with all permits and regulations nearby residents continued to report charcoal-like soot residue, and a $150,000 fine was imposed in 2013 for not complying with clean air permits.

== Community ==
DTE Stoneman directly employed over thirty people full-time, all local residents. The plant spent millions of dollars annually in maintenance costs, largely spent with local companies. Over fifty truck drivers and other personnel were indirectly employed to support the fuel supply of the plant. Stoneman provided training and purchased equipment for the Confined Space Rescue Qualification program for the local fire department.

== Units ==
Unit	Capacity (MW)	Commissioning	Notes
1	18 (nameplate); 15 (summer); 15 (winter)	1952	
2	35 (nameplate); 35 (summer); 35 (winter)	1952	

== See also ==
- List of power stations in Wisconsin
