= John J. Dewey =

American physician

John Jay Dewey
- Born: September 9, 1822; Butternuts, New York, U.S.
- Died: April 1, 1891 (aged 68); Saint Paul, Minnesota, U.S.
- Education: Hamilton Academy, Albany Medical College
- Occupations: Physician, Territorial Legislator
- Known for: Service in the Minnesota Territorial Legislature, Medical Practice
- Relatives: Nelson Dewey (brother)

John Jay "J.J." Dewey (September 9, 1822 – April 1, 1891) was an American physician and Minnesota territorial legislator.

Dewey was born in Butternuts, New York. He was educated at Hamilton Academy and Albany Medical College in New York state. In 1847, he moved West to the newly settled areas Wisconsin and the young settlement of Saint Paul, in what later became the Territory and State of Minnesota. He practiced medicine there and opened the first drug store in Saint Paul settlement. In 1849, Dewey served in the Minnesota Territorial Legislature, House of Representatives representing Saint Paul.

Without outbreak of the Civil War, Dewey helped organize the Minnesota 9th Infantry Regiment and was appointed its Surgeon. After short service, he resigned on health grounds. He also retired from his medical practice in 1881, 15 years prior to his death. He died at age 69 of pneumonia in Saint Paul and is buried there.

Dewey's brother was Nelson Dewey, the first Governor of Wisconsin.
