= Warren Chase =

American politician (1813–1891)

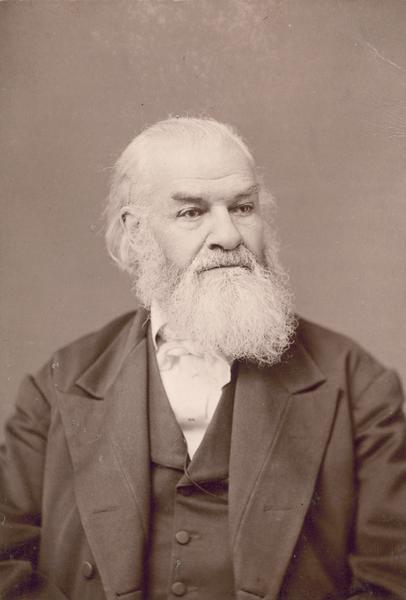

Member of the California Senate from the 3rd district
- In office January 5, 1880 – January 8, 1883
- Preceded by: Patrick W. Murphy
- Succeeded by: George Steele

Member of the Wisconsin Senate from the 4th district
- In office June 5, 1848 – January 9, 1850
- Preceded by: Position Established
- Succeeded by: John A. Eastman

Personal details
- Born: January 5, 1813 Pittsfield, New Hampshire, U.S.
- Died: February 25, 1891 (aged 78) Cobden, Illinois, U.S.
- Resting place: Cobden Cemetery; Cobden, Illinois, U.S.
- Party: Workingmen's (1879–1881); Greenback (1874–1884); Liberal Republican (1872); Republican (1854–1872); Free Soil (1848–1854); Democratic (before 1848)
- Spouses: Mary P. White (died 1875): Rachel Lukens
- Children: 3
- Profession: Pioneer, farmer, politician

Warren Chase (January 5, 1813 – February 25, 1891) was an American social reformer, politician, farmer, and pioneer of Wisconsin and California. He was also a significant figure in the American Spiritualist movement. He was the founder of the Utopian experimental community known as the "Wisconsin Phalanx"—now part of Ripon, Wisconsin—and helped found the school now known as Ripon College. He was one of only three people to serve as a delegate to both of Wisconsin's constitutional conventions, where he fought successfully for the legal right of married women to own property. He served terms in the Wisconsin Senate and the California Senate.

Politically, Chase favored radical social reforms and pursued it through multiple different political parties and movements. Originally a Democrat, he left the party over slavery and joined the Free Soil Party, then continued with the abolitionist cause and became a Republican. In the 1870s, disapproving of the excesses of the Republicans, Chase became a Liberal Republican, then joined the populist Greenback Party. During those Greenback years, he was also active with the Workingmen's Party of California. He wrote two autobiographical works, called The Life-Line of the Lone One: Or, Autobiography of the World's Child and Forty Years on the Spiritual Rostrum.

== Early life and education ==
Chase was born in Pittsfield, New Hampshire, on January 5, 1813. He was the son of Susanna Durgin, who was unmarried at the time. His mother was maligned by the community and expelled from the church for giving birth out of wedlock, making it difficult to provide for herself and Warren. Warren's father was Simon Chase, who was married to Huldah Peaslee. Simon Chase fought in the War of 1812 and died at Plattsburgh in the fall of 1814, when Warren was not yet two years old. His mother died only a few years later, when Warren was five.

As a child, Warren lived briefly with a Quaker family near Catamount Mountain. But after his mother's death, he became a ward of David Fogg and his family. Warren later described this time as a miserable experience and compared his servitude to slavery. He did not receive an education with the Fogg family, and at age fourteen was still not able to read or write. It was at that age he ran away to his grandmother's home in Pittsfield. Warren's grandmother and other members of the community interceded on his behalf and he was transferred to the care of his paternal grandfather, Nathaniel Chase, where he received a proper education and upbringing.

In 1834 he moved to Monroe, in the Michigan Territory, and then, in 1838, he moved to the Wisconsin Territory, settling in Kenosha (then known as "Southport").

== In Wisconsin ==
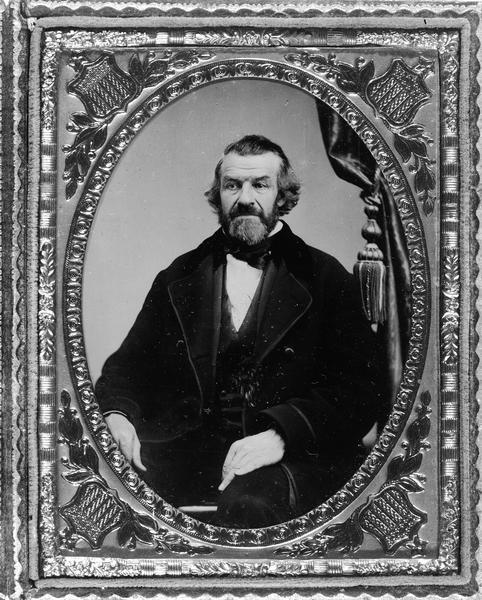
Ambrotype of Chase c. 1838–1853

In the fall of 1843 the Franklin Lyceum of Southport began discussing the ideas of the French philosopher Charles Fourier and his American popularizer Albert Brisbane. Convinced of the applicability of Fourier's "Associationist" prescription, Chase committed himself to the emerging movement without reservation, organizing a series of preliminary meetings to draft a constitution for a local "phalanx."

On March 23, 1844, a formal meeting of phalanx supporters was held at the Southport village schoolhouse, officers were elected, and a group of three, including Warren Chase, were tapped as trustees of the phalanx. A bond sale of $10,000 was approved and stock in the new enterprise began to be sold. On May 8, 1844, they decided to purchase 1.25 sections (800 acres) of government land, located in a valley between two gentle hills. By that fall a total of 1.5 sections (960 acres) were purchasedwhich would become Ceresco, Wisconsin (later merged into Ripon).

Chase helped found Ripon College. He was a supporter of the temperance, abolitionist, and spiritualist movements and wrote books and articles.

He served in the two Wisconsin Constitutional Conventions of 1846 and 1847 and was elected to the first Wisconsin Senate from 4th Senate district as a Democrat. In 1849, he was the candidate of the newly organized Free Soil Party for Governor of Wisconsin, coming in third behind Democratic incumbent Nelson Dewey and Whig Alexander L. Collins.

== After Wisconsin ==
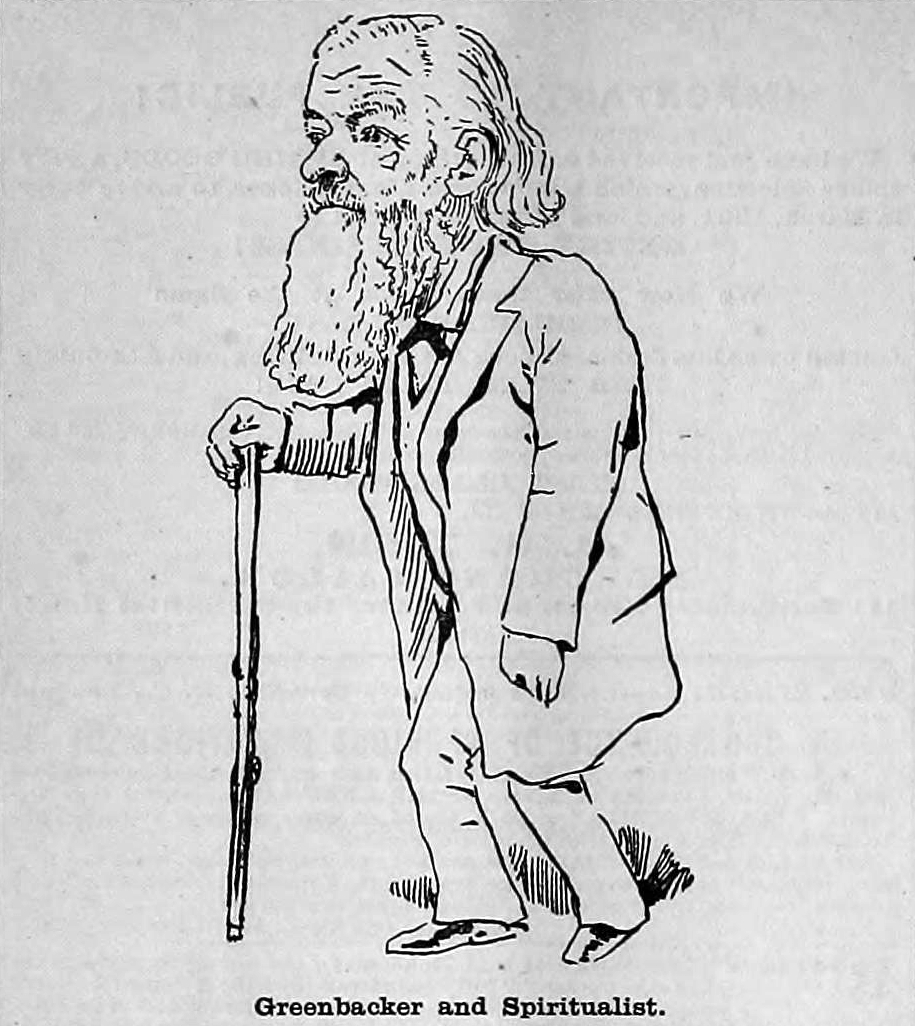
"Greenbacker and Spiritualist," a caricature of Chase published in the San Francisco News Letter, May 14, 1881

After the dissolution of the Wisconsin Phalanx, he moved to Michigan in 1853, then to Missouri, where he was elected as a Presidential elector for Horace Greeley in the 1872 United States presidential election.

In 1876 he moved to California and settled in Santa Barbara, where he worked as editor of the Independent. While in California he was elected to the California State Senate on the Workingmen's Party ticket, serving from 1880 to 1883. In 1880, he was a candidate for Senate President Pro Tempore, losing to Republican George F. Baker by a margin of 15 to 22. In 1882, he ran for Congress as a Greenbacker.

Chase was a supporter of free silver, anti-monopolism, and Chinese exclusion, although on the latter point he condemned racial violence like the San Francisco riot of 1877. When the California State Legislature convened in 1881 to elect a U.S. Senator, Chase nominated economist and newspaper publisher Henry George. In his nomination speech, Chase eulogized George as follows:

"He has in knowledge of American and European history no superior in this State. He is a man who can be an honor to the State and nation and to the United States Senate, and an honor to himself; a man whose heart beats in sympathy with the great body of the people; a man who is eminently like unto that greatest of modern men—Abraham Lincoln; a man who, if the people were to select, would be selected as the champion of their rights; a man—a man who has already gained a national reputation as the ablest political economist of America, standing the peer of John Stuart Mill, Ricardo and Adam Smith, and all the writers of history on political economy."

George only received two votes out of 40 cast in the State Senate; one from Chase, and the other from fellow Workingmen's Senator Joseph C. Gorman.

== Death ==
Warren Chase died in Cobden, Illinois, in 1891, and was buried at Cobden Cemetery.

== Electoral history ==
=== Wisconsin Governor (1849) ===
Wisconsin Gubernatorial Election, 1849
Party	Candidate	Votes	%	±%
General Election, November 6, 1849
Democratic	Nelson Dewey (incumbent)	16,649	52.42%	−3.20pp
Whig	Alexander L. Collins	11,317	35.63%	−5.50pp
Free Soil	Warren Chase	3,761	11.84%	
	Scattering	32	0.10%	
Plurality		5,332	16.79%	+2.3pp
Total votes		31,759	100.00%	-9.58%
Democratic hold				

== Published works ==
- Chase, Warren (1868). The Life-line of the Lone One: Or, Autobiography of the World's Child. Boston: William White & Co.
- Chase, Warren (1888). Forty Years on the Spiritual Rostrum. Boston: Colby & Rich.

Party political offices
Party established	Free Soil nominee for Governor of Wisconsin; 1849	Succeeded by Edward D. Holton
Wisconsin Senate
State government established	Member of the Wisconsin Senate from the 4th district June 5, 1848 – January 9, 1850	Succeeded by John A. Eastman
