= Denniston House =

Historic house in Wisconsin, United States

- Formerly listed on the U.S. National Register of Historic Places
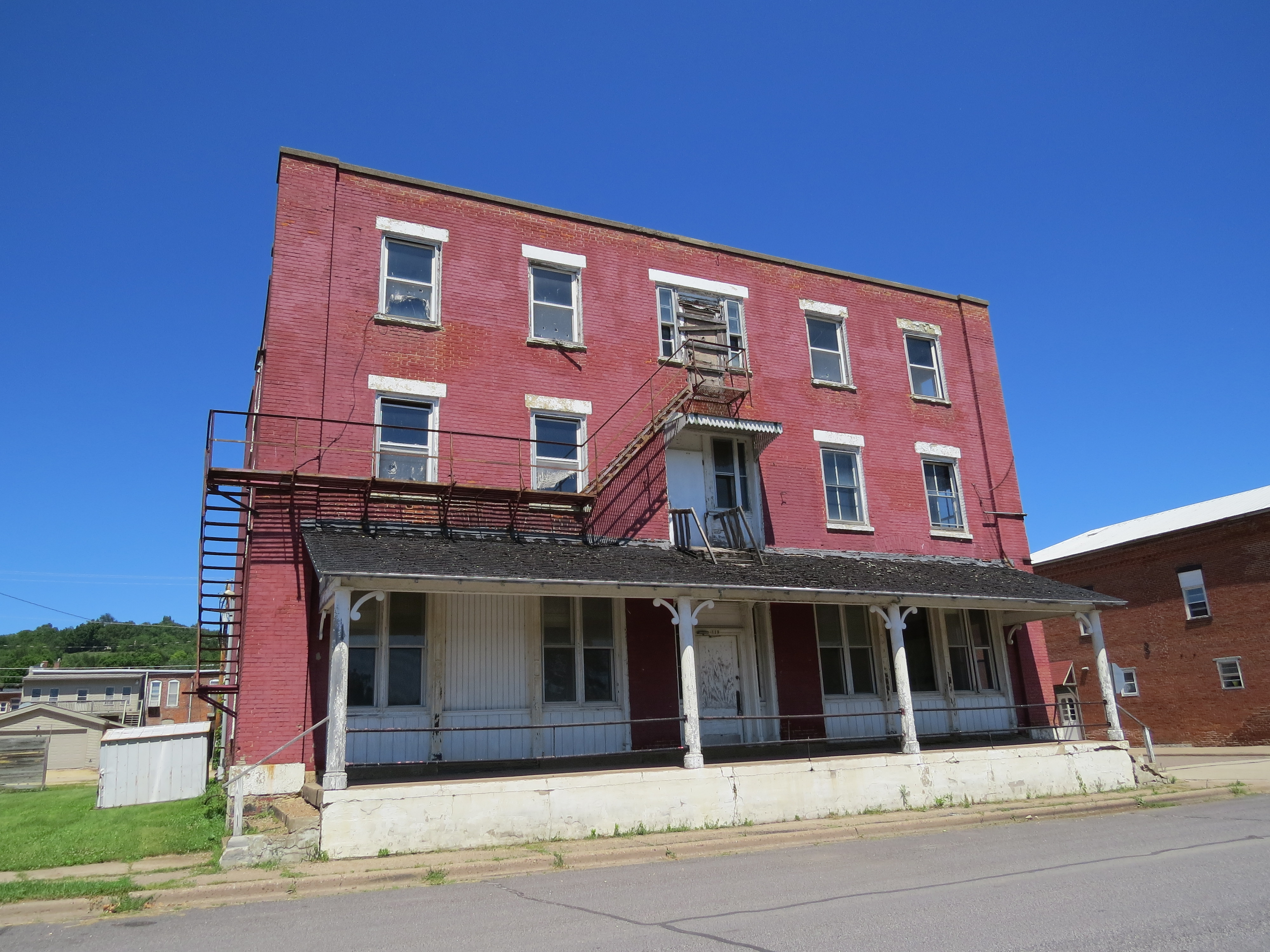

- Location within Wisconsin Location within the United States
- Location: 117 E. Front St. Cassville, Wisconsin
- Coordinates: 42°42′47″N 90°59′26″W
- Area: less than one acre
- Built: 1836
- NRHP reference No.: 75000213

Significant dates
- Added to NRHP: February 20, 1975
- Removed from NRHP: January 26, 2026

The Denniston House was a historic building located at 117 East Front Street in Cassville, Wisconsin.

== History ==
The house was built by a firm from New York City when Wisconsin was still the Wisconsin Territory. At the time, Cassville was considered likely to be selected as the capital of the future state and the house was thought to figure prominently in the future of the potential capital. However, the city of Madison was instead chosen. The house was later owned by Nelson Dewey, the first Governor of Wisconsin after it had become a state. Dewey opened the building as a hotel in 1854.

It was added to the National Register of Historic Places on February 20, 1975.

The building was torn down in 2024 after having been condemned for decades.

== See also ==
- List of the oldest buildings in Wisconsin
