= Don A. J. Upham =

American politician (1809-1877)

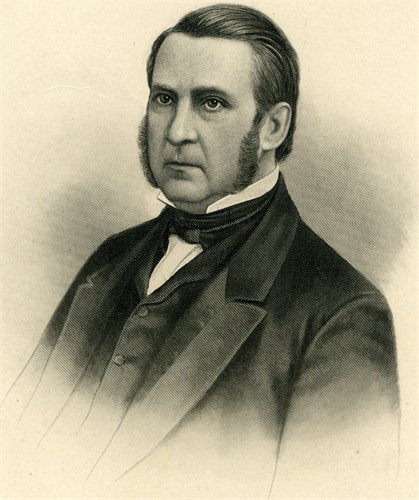

United States Attorney for the District of Wisconsin
- In office 1858–1861
- Appointed by: James Buchanan
- Preceded by: John R. Sharpstein
- Succeeded by: John B. D. Cogswell

4th Mayor of Milwaukee
- In office April 1849 – April 1851
- Preceded by: Byron Kilbourn
- Succeeded by: George H. Walker

Member of the Council of the Wisconsin Territory for Milwaukee and Washington counties
- In office December 7, 1840 – December 5, 1842 Serving with Jonathan Earle Arnold (1841) and John Hubbard Tweedy (1842)
- Preceded by: William A. Prentiss; and Daniel Wells, Jr.
- Succeeded by: Hans Crocker; Lemuel White; and David Newland

Personal details
- Born: May 1, 1809 Weathersfield, Vermont, U.S.
- Died: July 19, 1877 (aged 68) Milwaukee, Wisconsin, U.S.
- Resting place: Forest Home Cemetery; Milwaukee, Wisconsin
- Party: Democratic
- Spouse: Elizabeth Smith Jaques (m. 1836–1877)
- Children: John Jaques Upham^{(b. 1837; died 1898)}; Caroline Jaques (Raymond)^{(b. 1842; died 1924)}; Adelaide J. (Taylor)^{(b. 1850; died 1933)}; Sarah Maria (Ransom)^{(b. 1851; died 1912)}; Horace A. J. Upham^{(b. 1853; died 1919)}
- Parents: Joshua Upham (father); Phebe (Chamberlain) Upham (mother)
- Education: Union College
- Profession: lawyer, politician

Don Alonzo Joshua Upham (May 1, 1809 – July 19, 1877) was an American lawyer, Democratic politician, and Wisconsin pioneer. He served as the 4th Mayor of Milwaukee and was the Democratic nominee for Governor of Wisconsin in the 1851 election. He also served as President of the first Wisconsin Constitutional Convention and was United States Attorney for Wisconsin during the presidency of James Buchanan. His name was often abbreviated as D. A. J. Upham in historical documents.

== Early life ==
Upham was born in Weathersfield, Windsor County, Vermont in 1809. After graduating from Union College in Schenectady, New York, in 1831, he taught mathematics for three years at the University of Delaware in Newark, Delaware.

He then studied law privately in Delaware under James A. Bayard, Jr. He practiced law after being admitted to the Delaware bar in 1835. That year, he was also elected the Wilmington City Attorney. He was the owner and editor of The Delaware Gazette for three years. In 1837, Upham traveled west, eventually settling in the village of Milwaukee in the Wisconsin Territory, where he continued to work as a lawyer. Among the prospective attorneys who studied under him was Ira S. Haseltine.

== Political career ==
Upham held various political positions and in 1840 he served as a member of the Territorial Council, the upper house in the territory's legislature. He served in the Territorial Legislature from 1840 to 1842. In 1843 he was the Milwaukee County Attorney, and in 1846 he served as president of the first Wisconsin Constitutional Convention—though the constitution produced by this convention was not ratified by the voters. Upham served two one-year terms as Mayor of Milwaukee, for 1849 and 1850.

Upham was the Democratic nominee for Governor of Wisconsin in 1851, but fell 507 votes short of Whig candidate Leonard J. Farwell.

In 1858, President James Buchanan appointed Upham United States Attorney for the District of Wisconsin, where he served until his successor was appointed in 1861.

He died in Milwaukee, Wisconsin, on July 19, 1877, and is interred in Milwaukee's historic Forest Home Cemetery.

== Family life ==
Upham was the son of Joshua Upham and Phebe (Chamberlain) Upham. He married Elizabeth Smith Jaques October 20, 1836, and they were married until his death. They had five children: John Jaques Upham, Adelaide Upham, Horace Alonzo Upham, Caroline Jaques Upham and Sarah Maria Upham.

Horace's former summer home, now known as Wawbeek-Horace A.J. Upham House, is listed on the National Register of Historic Places.

The Uphams were descended from Massachusetts Bay colonist John Upham, who arrived in 1680 and settled in Malden.

Party political offices
Preceded by Nelson Dewey	Democratic nominee for Governor of Wisconsin; 1851	Succeeded by William A. Barstow
Political offices
Preceded by Byron Kilbourn	Mayor of Milwaukee; 1849–1850	Succeeded by George H. Walker
