= Nelson Dewey Generating Station =

Electrical power station in Cassville, Grant County, Wisconsin

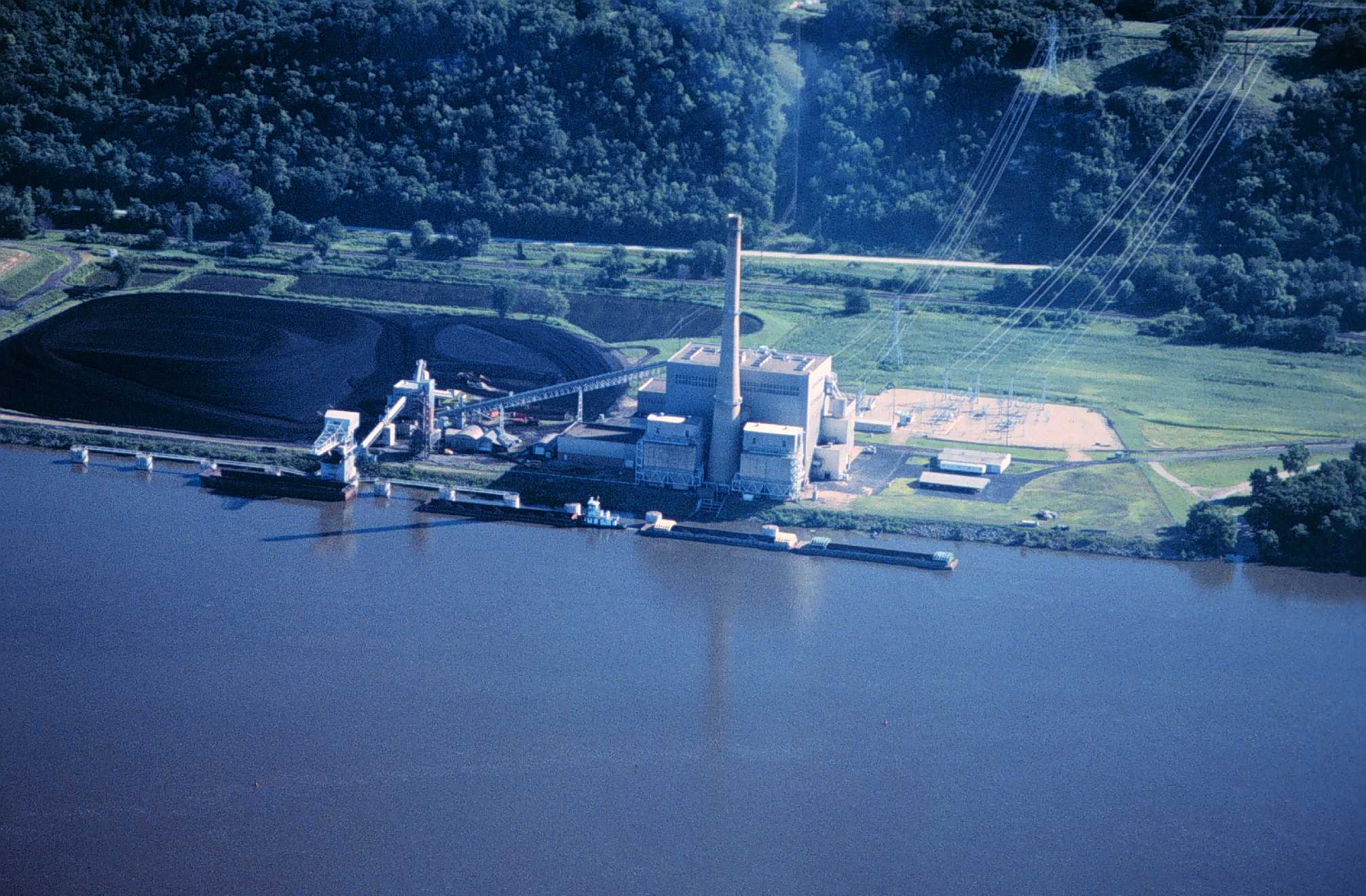
- Country: United States
- Location: Cassville, Wisconsin
- Coordinates: 42°43′21″N 91°0′31″W
- Status: Decommissioned
- Commission date: Unit 1: 1959; Unit 2: 1962
- Decommission date: Units 1–2: December 2015

Thermal power station
- Primary fuel: Coal
- Cooling source: Mississippi River

Power generation
- Nameplate capacity: 200 MW

Nelson Dewey Generating Station was a base load, coal-fired electrical power station located in Cassville, Wisconsin, in Grant County. The station was owned by Wisconsin Power and Light Company (WPL), an Alliant Energy company. It was shut down in late December 2015. The plant was demolished in late 2017.

It is named for Nelson Dewey (1813–1889), the first governor of Wisconsin.

== Units ==
Unit	Capacity (MW)	Commissioning	Notes
1	100 (nameplate); 112.8 (summer); 114.6 (winter)	1959	
2	100 (nameplate); 112.3 (summer); 115.5 (winter)	1962	

== See also ==
- List of power stations in Wisconsin
