= John Hubbard Tweedy =

Politician in Wisconsin Territory and state

John H. Tweedy
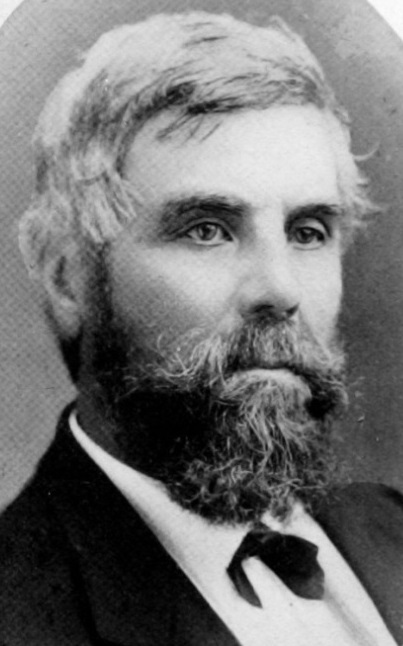
- From Volume 27 (1919) of Collections of the State Historical Society of Wisconsin

Member of the U.S. House of Representatives from Wisconsin Territory's at-large district
- In office March 4, 1847 – May 28, 1848
- Preceded by: Morgan L. Martin
- Succeeded by: Henry H. Sibley

Member of the Wisconsin State Assembly from the Milwaukee 1st district
- In office January 3, 1853 – January 2, 1854
- Preceded by: Charles Cain
- Succeeded by: Jackson Hadley

Member of the Council of the Wisconsin Territory for Milwaukee and Washington counties
- In office December 6, 1841 – December 5, 1842 Serving with Don A. J. Upham
- Preceded by: Jonathan Earle Arnold
- Succeeded by: Hans Crocker, Lemuel White, and David Newland

Personal details
- Born: November 9, 1814 Danbury, Connecticut, U.S.
- Died: November 12, 1891 (aged 77) Milwaukee, Wisconsin, U.S.
- Resting place: Wooster Cemetery, Danbury, Connecticut
- Party: Whig
- Education: Yale University

John Hubbard Tweedy (November 9, 1814 – November 12, 1891) was a delegate to the United States Congress from Wisconsin Territory from March 1847 to May 1848, being elected from the Whig Party. He was also the Whig Party nominee in the first Wisconsin gubernatorial election, where he lost to Nelson Dewey.

== Career ==
Tweedy was born in Danbury, Connecticut. He graduated from Yale University in 1834, where he was a member of the secret society Skull and Bones. He then moved to Milwaukee, Wisconsin Territory, in 1836, where he practiced law. He served in the Wisconsin Territorial Council, the upper house of the Wisconsin Territorial Legislature, in 1841–1842 and later served in the Wisconsin State Assembly in 1853. Tweedy was also a member of the first Wisconsin Constitutional Convention of 1846.

Tweedy was elected as a non-voting delegate to the Thirtieth Congress to represent the Wisconsin Territory, serving from March 4, 1847, until Wisconsin became a state on May 29, 1848. Tweedy was prominent in business involving railroads and public affairs. He died in Milwaukee, Wisconsin, aged 77, and was buried in Danbury, Connecticut.

== Private papers ==
His son, John H. Tweedy, Jr., donated his papers to the Wisconsin Historical Society.

== Notes ==
Party political offices
New office	Whig nominee for Governor of Wisconsin; 1848	Succeeded by Alexander L. Collins
Wisconsin State Assembly
Preceded by Charles Cain	Member of the Wisconsin State Assembly from the Milwaukee 1st district January 3, 1853 – January 2, 1854	Succeeded by Jackson Hadley
U.S. House of Representatives
Preceded by Morgan L. Martin	Member of the U.S. House of Representatives from Wisconsin Territory's at-large congressional district March 4, 1847 – May 28, 1848	Succeeded by Henry H. Sibley
