= Leonard J. Farwell =

American politician

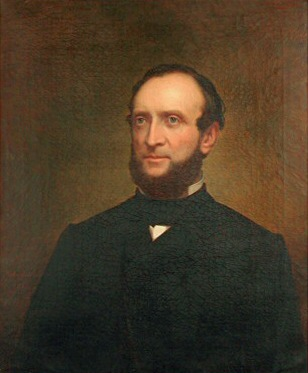
- 1865 portrait of Farwell by William F. Cogswell

2nd Governor of Wisconsin
- In office January 5, 1852 – January 2, 1854
- Lieutenant: Timothy Burns
- Preceded by: Nelson Dewey
- Succeeded by: William A. Barstow

Member of the Wisconsin State Assembly from the Dane 5th district
- In office January 1, 1860 – January 1, 1861
- Preceded by: Harlow S. Orton
- Succeeded by: Dominick O'Malley

Personal details
- Born: Leonard James Farwell; January 5, 1819 Watertown, New York, US
- Died: April 11, 1889 (aged 70) Grant City, Missouri, US
- Resting place: Grant City Cemetery
- Party: Republican; Whig (before 1854)
- Spouses: Frances A. Cross; (m. 1853; died 1868)
- Children: 3

Leonard James Farwell (January 5, 1819 – April 11, 1889) was an American politician and public administrator. He was the second governor of Wisconsin.

== Early life ==
Farwell was born in Watertown, New York, the son of James and Rebecca (Cady) Farwell; both his parents died before his 11th birthday. He completed common schooling and apprenticed as a tinsmith until age 19. At that age, he moved west, settling briefly at Lockport, Illinois, where he established himself as a tinsmith. In January 1840, he sold his tinsmith business and moved north, to Milwaukee, in the Wisconsin Territory. He opened a wholesale hardware business there, which developed into one of the largest in the western territories at the time.

He travelled extensively between 1846 and 1849, visiting Caribbean islands, Europe, and the near East. On his return, he settled in Dane County, Wisconsin, where he had invested in a great amount of property and owned roughly half the land of the village of Madison, the capitol of the new state. Farwell was active in building up the new capitol—he owned and operated half a dozen mills and shops, and was instrumental in laying out the streets and erecting the public buildings. He contributed to the establishment of the Wisconsin Historical Society, the state Agricultural Society, the public school system, and the University of Wisconsin.

== Public career ==
Farwell was nominated by the Whig Party as their candidate in the 1851 Wisconsin gubernatorial election. He defeated his opponent, former Milwaukee Mayor Don A. J. Upham, and led the Whigs to a strong showing in the Wisconsin Assembly elections down-ballot, though they did not capture other statewide offices. Farwell's success was likely due to his personal popularity and the contributions he had provided to assist recent immigrants arriving in Wisconsin. He served one term and declined re-nomination in 1853. He was the first and only Whig Governor of Wisconsin.

=== Governorship ===
His term as governor had several significant achievements for the state. In the 1852 session, he signed a law which established the official Wisconsin Supreme Court (1852 Wisconsin Act 395)—prior to this law, the Supreme Court had simply been constituted of the judges of the state's circuit courts. He worked with Democrats in the Wisconsin Senate to pass a major banking act (1852 Wisconsin Act 479) which established a bank comptroller, a state banking institution, and significant regulation of commercial banking and lending. This act was also put to referendum and passed with the support of 79% of the electorate in November 1852. He also signed into law the creation of Wisconsin's Commissioner of Emigration (1852 Wisconsin Act 432), to be established in New York City and to encourage migration to the state. The work of the migration commissioner likely contributed to Wisconsin's population growing by 200,000 over the next three years.

In the 1853 session, he signed a historic act abolishing the death penalty in Wisconsin and replaced it with a penalty of life imprisonment (1853 Wisconsin Act 103). This made Wisconsin the first state to abolish the gallows. In the same session, he signed the acts officially incorporating the State Historical Society (1853 Wisconsin Act 17), and the State Agricultural Society (1853 Wisconsin Act 5).

=== Later years ===
After leaving the governorship in 1854, Farwell concentrated on his business and local interests. He ran for alderman in Madison but lost by a close margin in 1857. Many of his investments were lost due to the Panic of 1857, and he ended up selling much of his property to pay his debts. He withdrew to his farm on the northern shores of Lake Mendota and took a role in managing the State Hospital for the Insane. In 1859, he briefly returned to politics when he was elected on the Republican ticket to represent northern Dane County in the Wisconsin State Assembly for the 1860 session. During the American Civil War, he served as vice president of the association for the relief of Wisconsin's soldiers, providing services for sick and disabled veterans of the war.

In 1863, he accepted an appointment from President Abraham Lincoln to the U.S. Patent Office and moved to Washington, D.C. He would serve as principal examiner of inventions for the next seven years.

=== Lincoln assassination ===
On the night of April 14, 1865, he was a witness, at Ford's Theatre, to the assassination of President Lincoln by John Wilkes Booth. He wisely presumed that other high officers of the Lincoln administration might also be endangered by the conspiracy and rushed to the vice president's boarding place, arriving in time to summon additional guards and save Andrew Johnson from the knife of George Atzerodt. Governor Farwell then proceeded to Secretary William H. Seward's residence but arrived too late to prevent that attack. President Johnson later offered Farwell any appointment he wanted in the federal government, but Farwell declined, choosing to continue his work in the Patent Office.

=== Return to the midwest ===
After seven years in Washington, Governor Farwell moved to Chicago and started a patent agency, but he fell victim to the Great Chicago Fire of 1871, and thus abandoned the city. He then relocated to the small town of Grant City, Missouri, where he entered into a partnership in banking and real-estate, and went on to contribute to the building of a new high school, courthouse, and other infrastructure in the city.

On April 11, 1889, after a brief illness, Farwell died in Grant City at the age of 70. He was interred at the Grant City Cemetery.

== Family life ==
Farwell was the son of James and Rebecca (Cady) Farwell; both of his parents died in his childhood, leaving him orphaned at age 11. He married Frances A. Cross (spelled "Corss" in many historical documents) on September 20, 1853, while he was serving his term as governor. She was the daughter of General Andrew N. Cross (or "Corss"), of Madison. They had three children together before her death, in 1868, while they were living in Washington.

== Electoral history ==
Wisconsin Gubernatorial Election, 1851
Party	Candidate	Votes	%	±%
General Election, November 4, 1851
Whig	Leonard J. Farwell	22,319	50.51%	+14.87%
Democratic	Don A. J. Upham	21,812	49.36%	−3.06%
	Scattering	59	0.13%	
Plurality		507	1.15%	-15.64%
Total votes		44,190	100.0%	+39.14%
Whig gain from Democratic		Swing	17.94%	

== See also ==
- Family Histories 1500–2000 for Leonard James Farwell; > DAR Lineage Book: NSDAR: vol 104: 1913.

Party political offices
Preceded by Alexander L. Collins	Whig nominee for Governor of Wisconsin; 1851	Succeeded by Henry S. Baird
Political offices
Preceded by Nelson Dewey	Governor of Wisconsin; 1853 – 1854	Succeeded by William A. Barstow
