= Wawbeek-Horace A.J. Upham House =

Historic house in Wisconsin, United States

- U.S. National Register of Historic Places
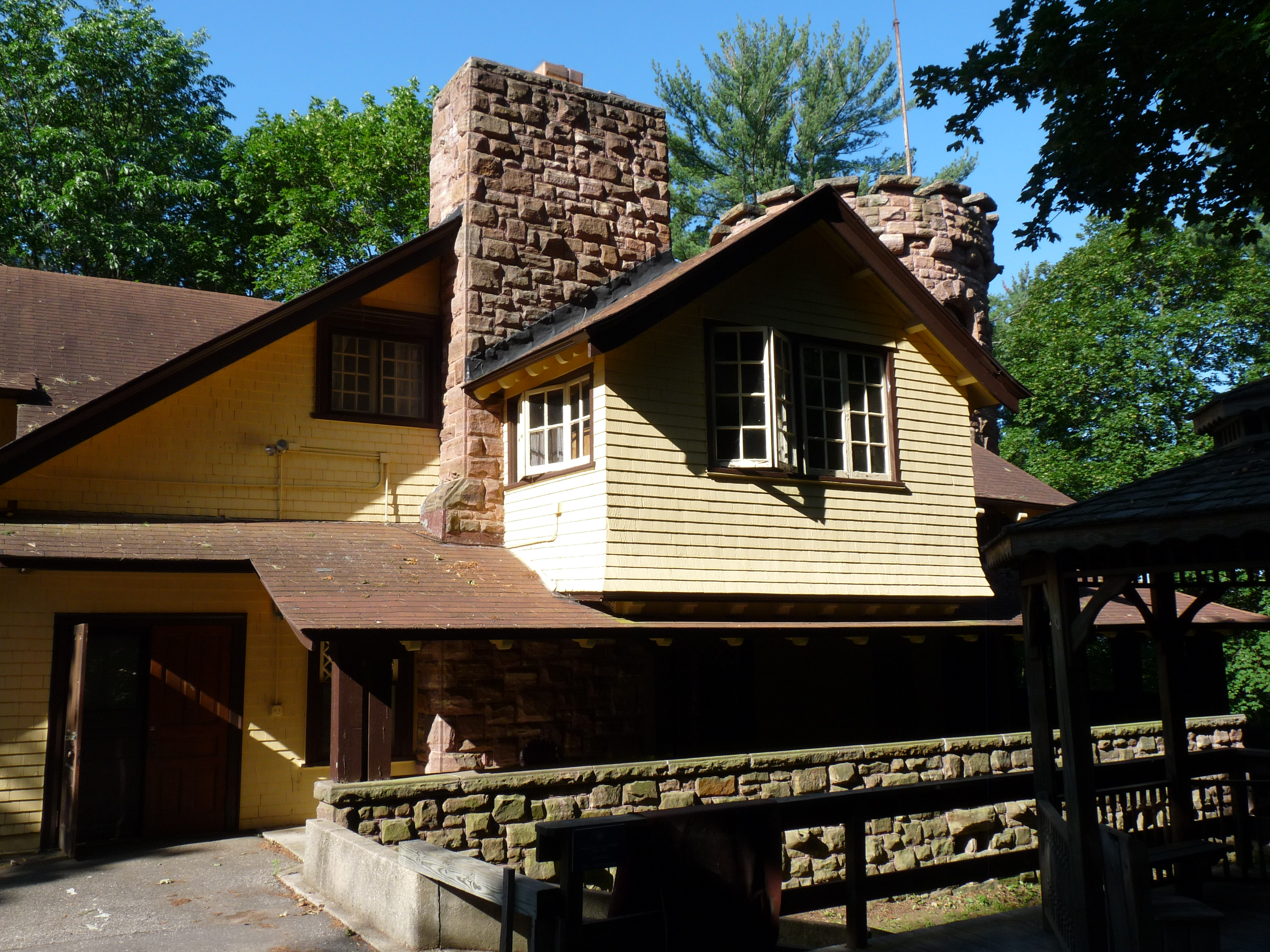
- Wawbeek-Horace A.J. Upham House
- Location: WI 13, Wisconsin Dells, Wisconsin
- Coordinates: 43°38′16″N 89°45′34″W
- Area: less than one acre
- Built: 1899, 1906
- Architect: Alexander C. Eschweiler
- Architectural style: Shingle Style
- NRHP reference No.: 85001355
- Added to NRHP: June 19, 1985

Wawbeek-Horace A.J. Upham House is located in Wisconsin Dells, Wisconsin.

== History ==
Horace Upham was a prominent Milwaukee-based lawyer and the son of Don A. J. Upham, a member of the legislature of the Wisconsin Territory and Mayor of Milwaukee. Horace and his wife, Catherine, had the house built as their summer home. In 1938, the Uphams donated the property to Wisconsin Easter Seals, which now uses it as Camp Wawbeek, for children with disabilities.

It was listed on the National Register of Historic Places in 1985 and on the State Register of Historic Places in 1989.
