= 1848 Wisconsin gubernatorial election =

- May 8, 1848
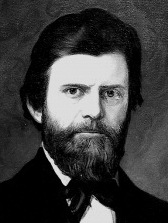

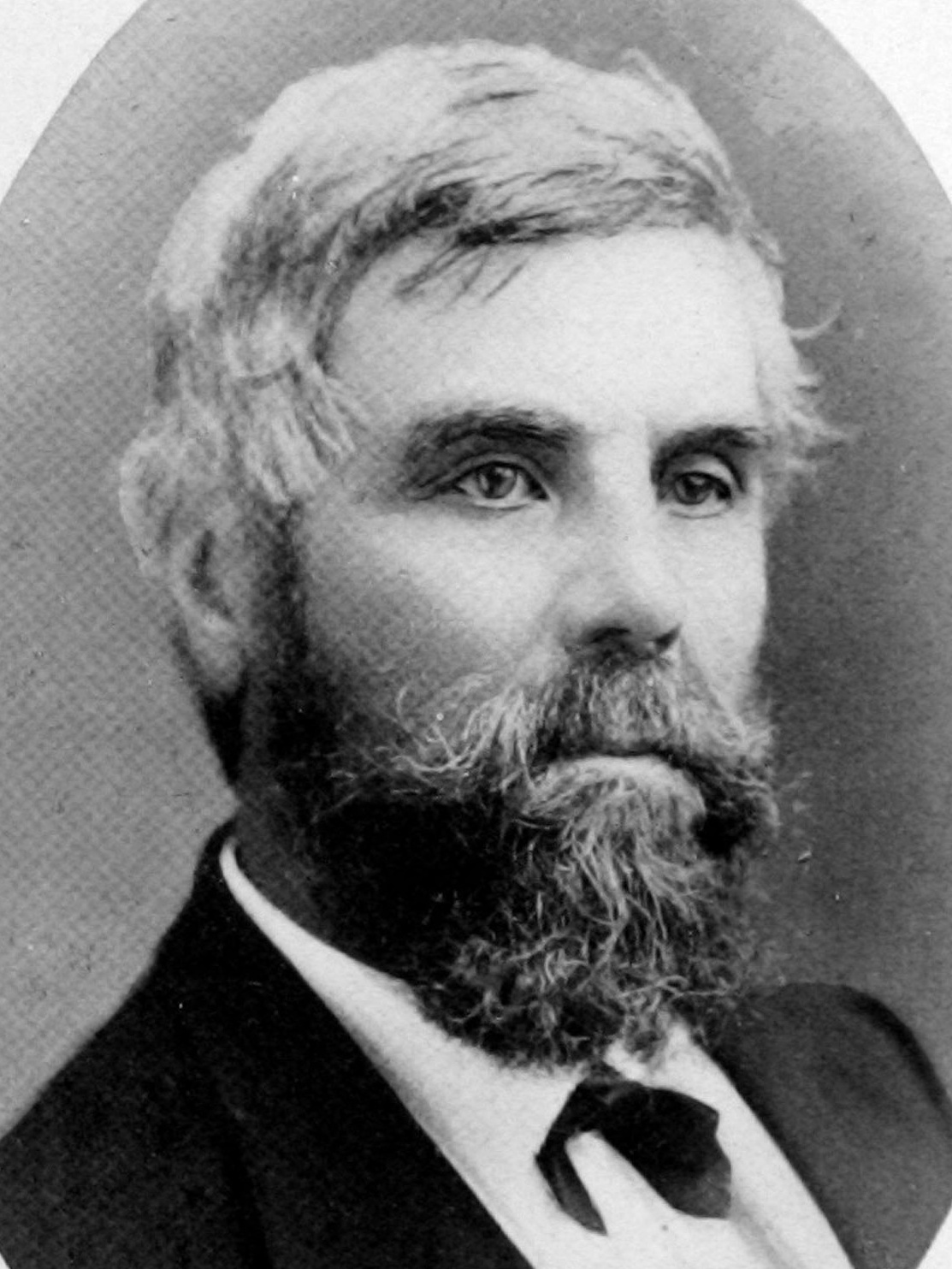
Nominee	Nelson Dewey	John H. Tweedy
Party	Democratic	Whig
Popular vote	19,538	14,449
Percentage	55.62%	41.14%
- County results Dewey: 50–60% 60–70% 70–80% 80–90% Tweedy: 50–60%
Elected Governor
Nelson Dewey
Democratic

The 1848 Wisconsin gubernatorial election was held on May 8, 1848. This was the election for the first Governor of Wisconsin, which became a U.S. state that year, as it was held concurrent with a public referendum to ratify the Constitution of Wisconsin.

Democrat Nelson Dewey, of Grant County, won the election with nearly 56% of the vote. Dewey defeated Whig Party candidate John Hubbard Tweedy, of Milwaukee. This is one of only three gubernatorial elections in which Walworth County has voted for a Democrat; it would not do so again until 1920.

== Democratic Party ==
Nelson Dewey was a prominent lawyer and real-estate investor in Grant County, Wisconsin. He did extensive business with the lead-mining industry, which was a major component of the economy of the Wisconsin Territory. He had been a member of nearly every session of the Wisconsin Territorial Legislature, first as a member of the Territorial Assembly, from 1838 to 1842, then as a member of the Territorial Council from 1842 to 1846. He served as Speaker of the Territorial Assembly in 1840, and President of the Territorial Council in 1846.

Dewey was chosen as a compromise candidate at the Democratic Party Convention after delegates became deadlocked between the lead-mining region's preferred candidate, Hiram Barber, and the eastern region's preferred candidate, Morgan Lewis Martin.

=== Other candidates ===
- Hiram Barber, of Dodge County, was a businessman and investor. He had been a delegate to Wisconsin's first constitutional convention in 1846. Prior to moving to Wisconsin, he had been a Judge in Warren County, New York, for 14 years.
- Morgan Lewis Martin, of Brown County, had most recently served as President of Wisconsin's second constitutional convention. Prior to this, he had served as the Wisconsin Territory's non-voting representative to the United States House of Representatives for the 29th Congress. He served in the Wisconsin Territorial Legislature from 1838 to 1844, and had served in the Michigan Territorial Legislature from 1831 to 1835, when the land which is now Wisconsin was a part of the Michigan Territory.

== Whig Party ==
John Hubbard Tweedy was, at the time of the 1848 election, the non-voting representative of the Wisconsin Territory to the United States House of Representatives for the 30th Congress. He had been a delegate to Wisconsin's first constitutional convention, and had served in the Wisconsin Territorial Assembly during the second session of the third legislature (Winter of 1841–1842).

== Independent candidate ==
Charles Durkee was a merchant, and one of the founders of Southport (now Kenosha, Wisconsin). He was a member of the Wisconsin Territorial Assembly for the first legislature (1836 to 1838).

== General election ==
=== Results ===
1848 Wisconsin Gubernatorial Election
Party	Candidate	Votes	%
Democratic	Nelson Dewey	19,538	55.62%
Whig	John H. Tweedy	14,449	41.14%
Independent	Charles Durkee	1,134	3.23%
	Scattering	4	0.01
Majority		5,089	14.49%
Total votes		35,125	100.00%
Democratic win (new seat)			

=== Results by county ===
County	Nelson Dewey Democratic		John H. Tweedy Whig		Charles Durkee Independent		Scattering Write-in		Margin		Total votes cast
County	#	%	#	%	#	%	#	%	#	%	Total votes cast
Brown	311	69.42	137	30.58	0	0.00	0	0.00%	174	38.84	448
Calumet	113	63.13	66	36.87	0	0.00	0	0.00%	47	26.26	179
Columbia	328	44.38	411	55.62	0	0.00	0	0.00%	-83	-11.23	739
Crawford (Note: Includes Chippewa, La Pointe, and St. Croix counties)	270	71.62	107	28.38	0	0.00	0	0.00%	163	43.24	377
Dane	1,098	58.94	751	40.31	13	0.70	1	0.05%	347	18.63	1,863
Dodge	1,116	59.55	706	37.67	52	2.77	0	0.00%	410	21.88	1,874
Fond du Lac	622	49.05	510	40.22	136	10.73	0	0.00%	112	8.83	1,268
Grant	1,199	44.92	1,467	54.96	3	0.11	0	0.00%	-268	-10.04	2,669
Green	481	53.44	406	45.11	13	1.44	0	0.00%	75	8.33	900
Iowa (Note: Includes Richland County)	847	53.20	745	46.80	0	0.00	0	0.00%	102	6.41	1,592
Jefferson	1,157	54.81	893	41.19	0	0.00	0	0.00%	369	17.61	2,095
Lafayette	1,232	58.81	863	41.19	0	0.00	0	0.00%	369	17.61	2,095
Marquette	230	45.01	258	50.49	23	4.50	0	0.00%	-28	-5.48	511
Milwaukee	2,201	63.17	1,194	34.27	89	2.55	0	0.00%	1,007	28.90	3,484
Portage	160	51.12	153	48.88	0	0.00	0	0.00%	7	2.24	313
Racine	1,765	54.90	1,209	37.60	238	7.40	3	0.09%	556	17.29	3,215
Rock	1,394	48.04	1,475	50.83	33	1.14	0	0.00%	-81	-2.79	2,902
Sauk	187	52.97	157	44.48	9	2.55	0	0.00%	30	8.50	353
Sheboygan	554	57.77	384	40.04	21	2.19	0	0.00%	170	17.73	959
Walworth	1,478	49.12	1,356	45.06	175	5.82	0	0.00%	122	4.05	3,009
Washington	1,598	85.87	263	14.13	0	0.00	0	0.00%	1,335	71.74	1,861
Waukesha	1,197	49.81	938	39.03	268	11.15	0	0.00%	259	10.78	2,403
Total	19,538	55.62%	14,449	41.14%	1,134	3.23%	4	0.01%	5,089	14.49%	35,125
