= Cass Township, Wapello County, Iowa =

Township in Iowa, United States

Coordinates: 41.0728°N 92.5416°W

Cass Township is a township in Wapello County, Iowa, United States.

== History ==
Cass Township was organized in 1851.
