= Cassville, Wisconsin =

- Village
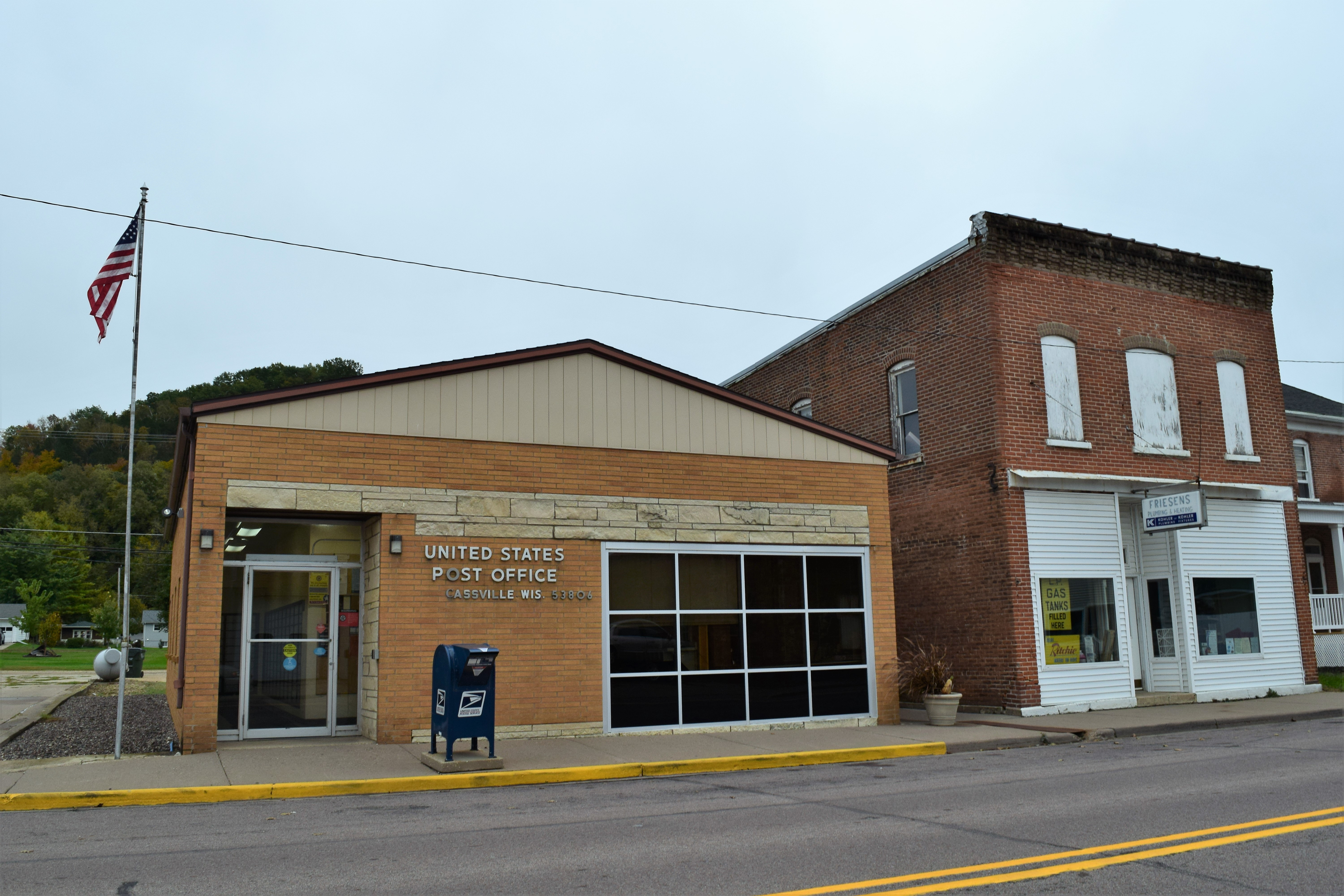
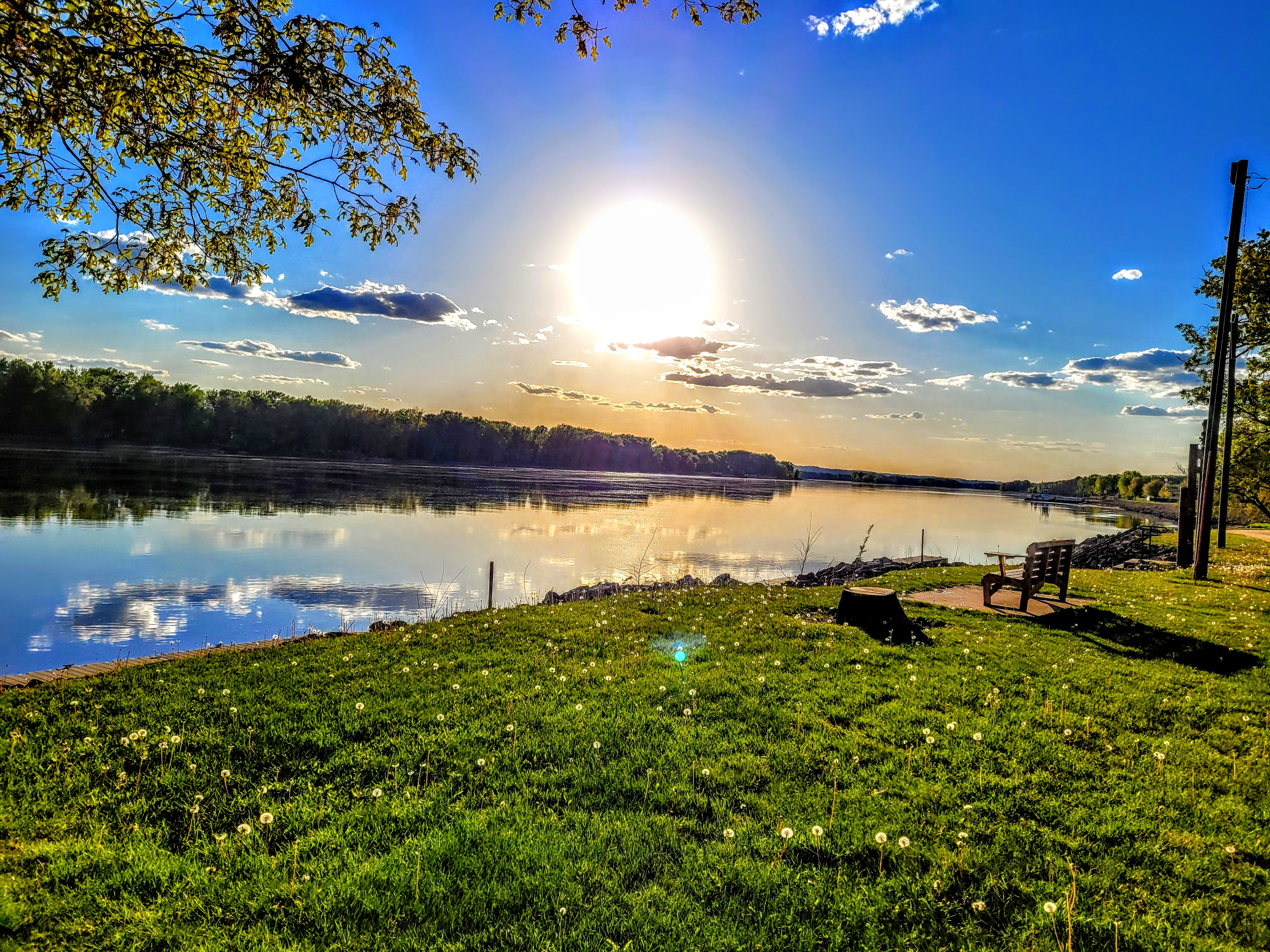
- Top: U.S. Post Office, Bottom: Riverside Park

- Location of Cassville in Grant County, Wisconsin.
- Coordinates: 42°42′54.06″N 90°59′21.12″W
- Country: United States
- State: Wisconsin
- County: Grant

Area
  - Total: 1.10 sq mi (2.85 km^{2})
  - Land: 1.04 sq mi (2.69 km^{2})
  - Water: 0.062 sq mi (0.16 km^{2})
- Elevation: 633 ft (193 m)

Population (2020)
  - Total: 777
  - Density: 747.8/sq mi (288.7/km^{2})
- Time zone: UTC-6 (Central (CST))
  - Summer (DST): UTC-5 (CDT)
- Area code: 608
- FIPS code: 55-13050
- GNIS feature ID: 1582927
- Website: www.cassville.org

Cassville is a village in Grant County, Wisconsin, United States. The population was 777 at the 2020 census. The village is located along the Mississippi River, opposite the mouth of the Turkey River. It is surrounded by the Town of Cassville.

== Etymology ==
The village was named after Lewis Cass, the governor of Michigan Territory from 1813 to 1831. The name has been used by the community since at least 1828, when the post office was established by Allen Hill.

== History ==
The site of Cassville was occupied by the Meskwaki people before European settlement. In 1820, Henry Schoolcraft observed a Meskwaki village consisting of twelve substantial log lodges and cultivated fields in the locality.

The Euro-American settlement of Cassville began in 1827, when Judge John Sawyer of Illinois established a smelting furnace to serve lead miners who were expanding northward from Galena, Illinois. The town attracted sixty to seventy people in its first year. By the early 1830s, Cassville held several log cabins, a tavern, a general store, and a blockhouse constructed during the Black Hawk War.

Cassville experienced a brief boom in 1836, when real estate speculators incorrectly bet that the river landing would become the capital city of the newly established Wisconsin Territory. A group of investors from Albany, New York, doing business as Daniels, Denniston & Co., purchased most of the town site. They also financed the construction of the Denniston House, a substantial brick lodging house reputed to cost $45,000 in 1836. Cassville's failure to become capital, combined with the Panic of 1837, caused an abrupt halt in the town's growth, and much of the land was locked in legal disputes for the following decade.

Nelson Dewey settled in Cassville in 1836 as a clerk for Daniels, Denniston & Co. He later became first Governor of Wisconsin from 1848-1852. Following his term as governor, Dewey invested in the completion of the Denniston House as a hotel in the 1850s and promoted Cassville's development, albeit with only limited success. Dewey established his personal estate, Stonefield, on the north side of Cassville in the 1860s. The estate grounds later became Nelson Dewey State Park, and in 1953 the Wisconsin Historical Society established Stonefield Historic Site at Dewey's former mansion.

== Geography ==
Cassville is located at 42°42′55.34″N 90°59′26.08″W.

According to the United States Census Bureau, the village has a total area of 1.1 square miles (2.8 km^{2}), of which 1.04 square miles (2.7 km^{2}) is land and 0.06 square miles (0.16 km^{2}) is water.

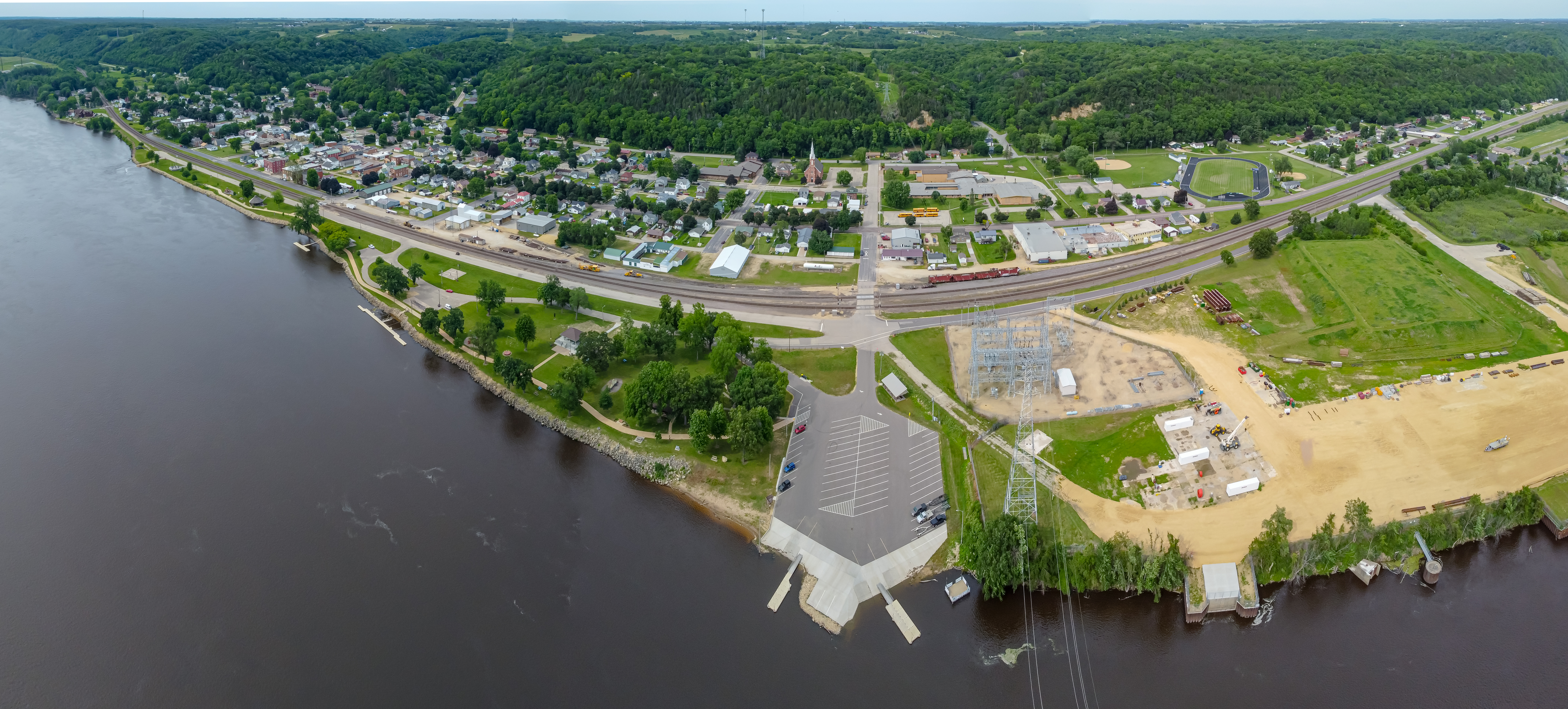

== Demographics ==
Historical population
Census	Pop.	Note	%±
1870	551		—
1880	610		10.7%
1890	886		45.2%
1900	979		10.5%
1910	890		−9.1%
1920	899		1.0%
1930	875		−2.7%
1940	956		9.3%
1950	984		2.9%
1960	1,290		31.1%
1970	1,343		4.1%
1980	1,270		−5.4%
1990	1,144		−9.9%
2000	1,085		−5.2%
2010	947		−12.7%
2020	777		−18.0%
U.S. Decennial Census

=== 2020 census ===
As of the census of 2020, the population was 777. The population density was 747.8 inhabitants per square mile (288.7/km^{2}). There were 514 housing units at an average density of 494.7 per square mile (191.0/km^{2}). The racial makeup of the village was 95.0% White, 0.4% Asian, 0.3% Black or African American, 0.3% Native American, 0.8% from other races, and 3.3% from two or more races. Ethnically, the population was 1.2% Hispanic or Latino of any race.

=== 2010 census ===
As of the census of 2010, there were 947 people, 428 households, and 277 families living in the village. The population density was 976.3 inhabitants per square mile (377.0/km^{2}). There were 582 housing units at an average density of 600.0 per square mile (231.7/km^{2}). The racial makeup of the village was 98.6% White, 0.1% Native American, 0.2% Asian, 0.2% from other races, and 0.8% from two or more races. Hispanic or Latino of any race were 0.3% of the population.

There were 428 households, of which 24.5% had children under the age of 18 living with them, 50.5% were married couples living together, 10.7% had a female householder with no husband present, 3.5% had a male householder with no wife present, and 35.3% were non-families. 31.8% of all households were made up of individuals, and 17.3% had someone living alone who was 65 years of age or older. The average household size was 2.21 and the average family size was 2.75.

The median age in the village was 48.3 years. 20.8% of residents were under the age of 18; 7.3% were between the ages of 18 and 24; 17% were from 25 to 44; 31.2% were from 45 to 64; and 23.7% were 65 years of age or older. The gender makeup of the village was 49.0% male and 51.0% female.

=== 2000 census ===
As of the census of 2000, there were 1,085 people, 488 households, and 302 families living in the village. The population density was 1,005.1 people per square mile (387.9/km^{2}). There were 572 housing units at an average density of 529.9 per square mile (204.5/km^{2}). The racial makeup of the village was 99.17% White, 0.46% Native American, 0.09% from other races, and 0.28% from two or more races. 0.37% of the population were Hispanic or Latino of any race.

There were 488 households, out of which 26.2% had children under the age of 18 living with them, 49.4% were married couples living together, 9.2% had a female householder with no husband present, and 38.1% were non-families. 35.2% of all households were made up of individuals, and 20.9% had someone living alone who was 65 years of age or older. The average household size was 2.22 and the average family size was 2.82.

In the village, the population was spread out, with 24.1% under the age of 18, 5.3% from 18 to 24, 22.9% from 25 to 44, 23.8% from 45 to 64, and 24.0% who were 65 years of age or older. The median age was 42 years. For every 100 females, there were 90.7 males. For every 100 females age 18 and over, there were 87.0 males.

The median income for a household in the village was $28,179, and the median income for a family was $35,625. Males had a median income of $29,271 versus $17,014 for females. The per capita income for the village was $16,010. About 10.3% of families and 14.6% of the population were below the poverty line, including 13.1% of those under age 18 and 23.3% of those age 65 or over.

== Economy ==
The Nelson Dewey Generating Station and the E. J. Stoneman Generating Station were in Cassville. Both closed in 2015.

== Transportation ==
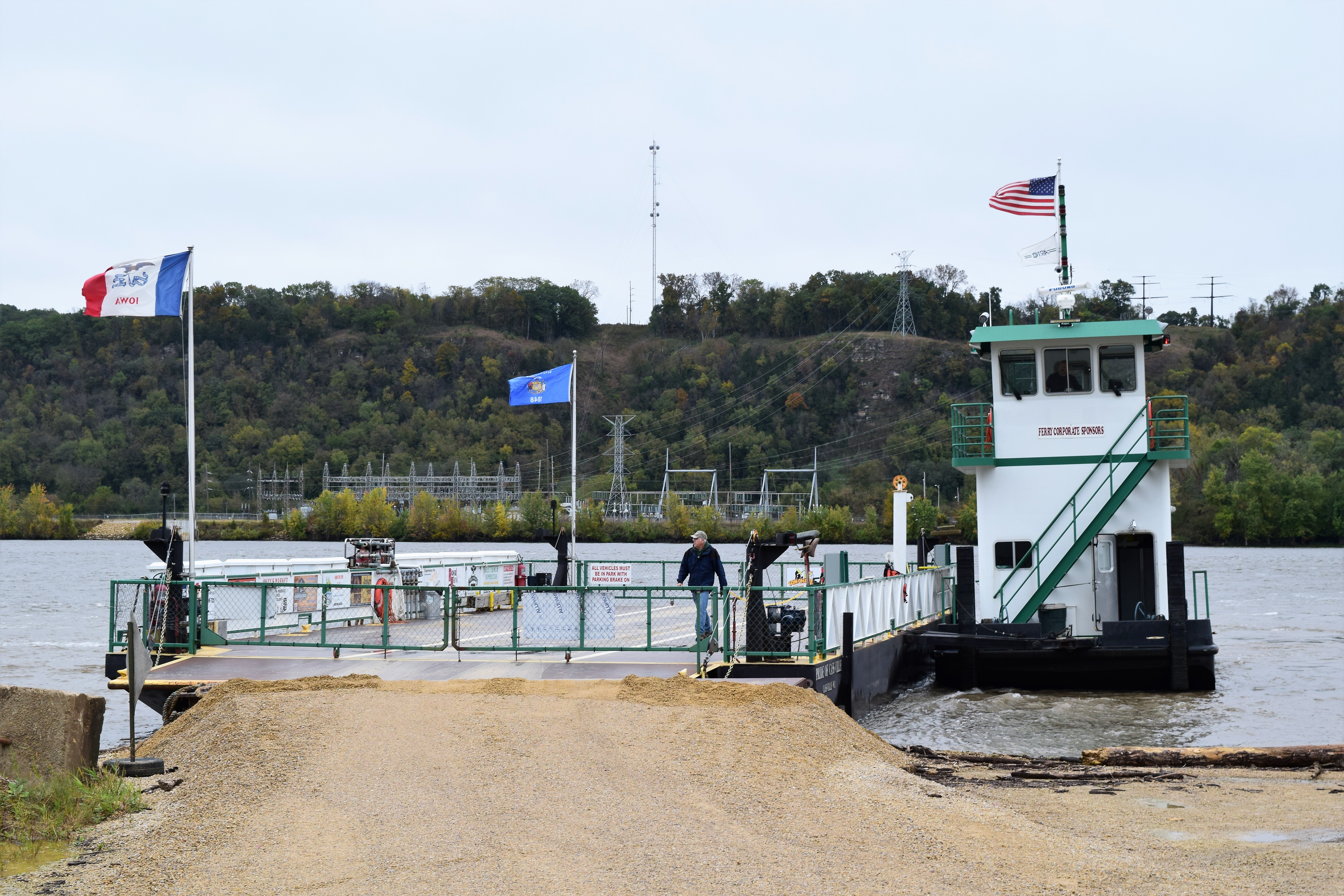
The Cassville Car Ferry on the Iowa side of the river

From late spring through early fall, the Cassville Car Ferry connects Cassville with rural Clayton County, Iowa, near Millville. During periods of high water, the ferry may not operate.

The Cassville Municipal Airport is located one mile (1.6 km) southeast of the village, along the banks of the Mississippi River.

== Notable people ==
- Joseph Bock, soldier and member of the Wisconsin State Assembly
- Nelson Dewey, first Wisconsin Governor 1848−1852
- Patrick H. Kelly, educator and member of the Wisconsin State Assembly
