= Cass Township, Cedar County, Iowa =

Township in Iowa, US

Cass Township, Cedar County
- Township
- Coordinates: 41°47′16″N 091°17′16″W
- Country: United States
- State: Iowa
- County: Cedar

Area
  - Total: 26.98 sq mi (69.88 km^{2})
  - Land: 26.15 sq mi (67.72 km^{2})
  - Water: 0.83 sq mi (2.16 km^{2})
- Elevation: 771 ft (235 m)

Population (2000)
  - Total: 295
  - Density: 11/sq mi (4.4/km^{2})
- FIPS code: 19-90495
- GNIS feature ID: 0467539

Cass Township is one of seventeen townships in Cedar County, Iowa, United States. As of the 2000 census, its population was 295.

== History ==
The first settler in Cass Township was William Kester, who arrived about 1837.

== Geography ==
Cass Township covers an area of 26.98 square miles (69.9 km^{2}) and contains no incorporated settlements. According to the USGS, it contains four cemeteries: Cass, Evergreen, Mathews and Shawver.
