= Cass Township, Boone County, Iowa =

Township in Iowa, US

Cass Township, Boone County
- Township
- Coordinates: 41°54′22″N 93°54′00″W
- Country: United States
- State: Iowa
- County: Boone

Area
  - Total: 18.36 sq mi (47.55 km^{2})
  - Land: 18.05 sq mi (46.74 km^{2})
  - Water: 0.31 sq mi (0.81 km^{2})
- Elevation: 997 ft (304 m)

Population (2020)
  - Total: 612
  - Density: 34/sq mi (13.1/km^{2})
- FIPS code: 19-90489
- GNIS feature ID: 0467537

Cass Township is one of seventeen townships in Boone County, Iowa, United States. As of the 2020 United States census, its population was 612.

== History ==
Cass Township was established in 1858. It is named for Lewis Cass.

== Geography ==
Cass Township covers an area of 18.36 square miles (47.6 km^{2}) and contains no incorporated settlements. According to the USGS, it contains two cemeteries: Liberty and State Hospital.
