= Cass Township, Greene County, Missouri =

Township in Missouri, United States

Coordinates: 37.3769°N 93.4564°W

Cass Township is an inactive township in Greene County, in the U.S. state of Missouri.

Cass Township is named after the politician Lewis Cass.
