= Cassville (town), Wisconsin =

Town in Grant County, Wisconsin, US

Cassville, Wisconsin
- Town
- Town of Cassville
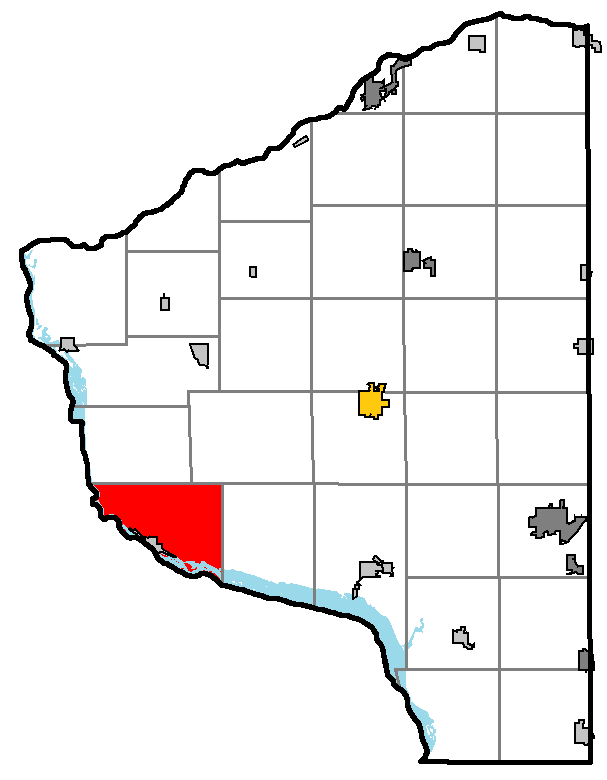
- Location of Cassville, within Grant County, Wisconsin

- Location of Grant County, within Wisconsin
- Coordinates: 42°44′39″N 90°58′00″W
- Country: United States
- State: Wisconsin
- County: Grant

Area
  - Total: 36.58 sq mi (94.7 km^{2})
  - Land: 33.31 sq mi (86.3 km^{2})
  - Water: 3.27 sq mi (8.5 km^{2})

Population (2020)
  - Total: 402
  - Density: 12.1/sq mi (4.66/km^{2})
- Time zone: UTC-6 (Central (CST))
  - Summer (DST): UTC-5 (CDT)
- ZIP Code: 53806
- Area code(s): 608 and 353
- GNIS feature ID: 1582928

Cassville is a town in Grant County, Wisconsin, United States. The population was 402 at the 2020 census. The Village of Cassville is located within the town.

== Geography ==
According to the United States Census Bureau, the town has a total area of 36.4 square miles (94.2 km^{2}), of which 33.5 square miles (86.6 km^{2}) is land and 2.9 square miles (7.5 km^{2}) (8.00%) is water.

== Demographics ==
As of the census of 2000, there were 487 people, 185 households, and 135 families living in the town. The population density was 14.6 people per square mile (5.6/km^{2}). There were 220 housing units at an average density of 6.6 per square mile (2.5/km^{2}). The racial makeup of the town was 99.59% White, 0.21% Black or African American, and 0.21% from two or more races. 0.00% of the population were Hispanic or Latino of any race.

Of the 185 households 35.7% had children under the age of 18 living with them, 63.2% were married couples living together, 5.4% had a female householder with no husband present, and 27.0% were non-families. 23.8% of households were one person and 10.3% were one person aged 65 or older. The average household size was 2.63 and the average family size was 3.14.

The age distribution was 29.0% under the age of 18, 6.0% from 18 to 24, 28.1% from 25 to 44, 24.6% from 45 to 64, and 12.3% 65 or older. The median age was 38 years. For every 100 females, there were 111.7 males. For every 100 females age 18 and over, there were 112.3 males.

The median household income was $35,104 and the median family income was $37,750. Males had a median income of $22,250 versus $19,083 for females. The per capita income for the town was $15,492. About 12.8% of families and 16.8% of the population were below the poverty line, including 25.0% of those under age 18 and 9.2% of those age 65 or over.
