= Cass Township, Jones County, Iowa =

Township in Iowa, United States

Coordinates: 42.1656°N 91.3061°W

Cass Township is a township in Jones County, Iowa, United States.

== History ==
Cass Township was organized in 1852.
