= Cass Township, Harrison County, Iowa =

Township in Iowa, USA

Coordinates: 41°39′N 95°37′W

Cass Township is a township in Harrison County, Iowa, United States.
