= Cass Township, Hamilton County, Iowa =

Township in Iowa, USA

Coordinates: 42°31′N 93°48′W

Cass Township is a township in Hamilton County, Iowa, United States.
