= Cass Township, Texas County, Missouri =

Township in the U.S. state of Missouri

Cass Township
- Township
- Location within Missouri
- Country: United States
- State: Missouri
- County: Texas County
- Established: 1845
- Elevation: 1,302 ft (397 m)

Population (2020)
  - Total: 1,065
- Time zone: CDT
- ZIP Codes: 65464, 65483, 65564, 65589, 65689, 65793
- Area code: 417

Cass Township is a township in Texas County, in the U.S. state of Missouri.

Cass Township was originally called "Benton Township", and under the latter name was established in 1845, and named after Thomas Hart Benton. The present name, adopted in 1850, honors Lewis Cass.
