= Cass Township, Douglas County, Missouri =

Township in Missouri, U.S.

Coordinates: 37°01′06″N 92°21′40″W

Cass Township is a township in northern Douglas County, in the U.S. state of Missouri.
