= Cass Township, Huntingdon County, Pennsylvania =

Township in Pennsylvania, US

Coordinates: 40°14′30″N 77°58′59″W

- Township
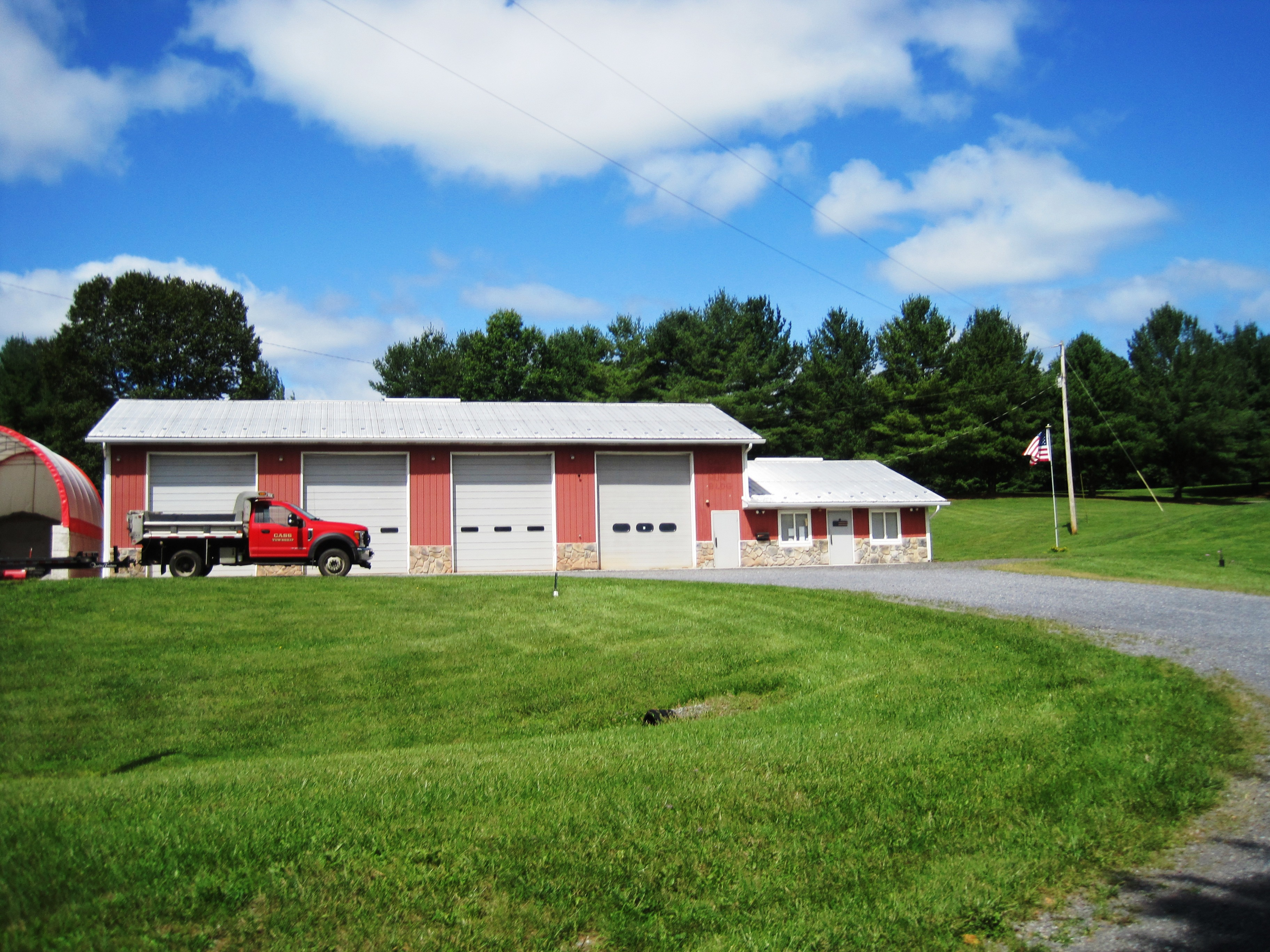
- Cass Township Municipal Building

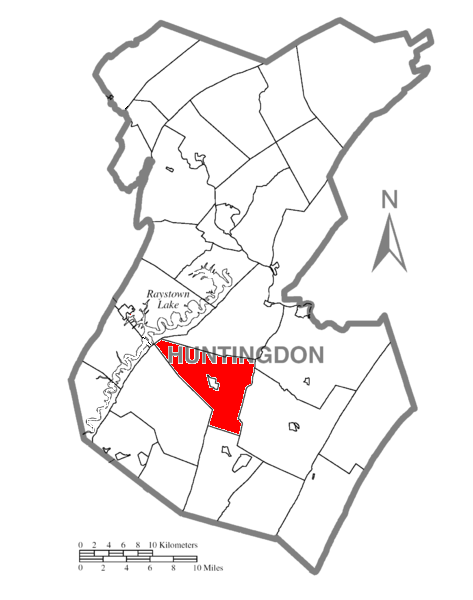
- Map of Huntingdon County, Pennsylvania Highlighting Cass Township

- Map of Huntingdon County, Pennsylvania
- Country: United States
- State: Pennsylvania
- County: Huntingdon

Area
  - Total: 32.97 sq mi (85.38 km^{2})
  - Land: 32.97 sq mi (85.38 km^{2})
  - Water: 0 sq mi (0.00 km^{2})

Population (2020)
  - Total: 1,014 ▼
  - Estimate (2022): 994
  - Density: 33.5/sq mi (12.93/km^{2})
- Time zone: UTC-5 (Eastern (EST))
  - Summer (DST): UTC-4 (EDT)
- FIPS code: 42-061-11600

Cass Township is a township in Huntingdon County, Pennsylvania, United States. The population was 1,014 at the 2020 census.

== General information ==
- ZIP Codes: 16622, 16623
- Area Code: 814
- Local Phone Exchanges: 447, 448
- School District: Southern Huntingdon County School District

== Geography ==
According to the United States Census Bureau, the township has a total area of 32.6 square miles (84 km^{2}), all land.

== Demographics ==
Historical population
Census	Pop.	Note	%±
2000	1,062		—
2010	1,119		5.4%
2020	1,014		−9.4%
2022 (est.)	994		−2.0%
U.S. Decennial Census

As of the census of 2000, there were 1,062 people, 404 households, and 324 families residing in the township. The population density was 32.6 inhabitants per square mile (12.6/km^{2}). There were 622 housing units at an average density of 19.1/sq mi (7.4/km^{2}). The racial makeup of the township was 99.53% White, 0.19% Native American, 0.09% from other races, and 0.19% from two or more races. Hispanic or Latino of any race were 0.09% of the population.

There were 404 households, out of which 34.4% had children under the age of 18 living with them, 69.8% were married couples living together, 6.4% had a female householder with no husband present, and 19.8% were non-families. 17.3% of all households were made up of individuals, and 8.4% had someone living alone who was 65 years of age or older. The average household size was 2.63 and the average family size was 2.94.

In the township the population was spread out, with 25.0% under the age of 18, 7.0% from 18 to 24, 29.0% from 25 to 44, 25.0% from 45 to 64, and 14.0% who were 65 years of age or older. The median age was 38 years. For every 100 females, there were 94.1 males. For every 100 females age 18 and over, there were 95.3 males.

The median income for a household in the township was $35,083, and the median income for a family was $40,446. Males had a median income of $30,192 versus $21,667 for females. The per capita income for the township was $16,282. About 3.9% of families and 6.3% of the population were below the poverty line, including 8.2% of those under age 18 and 8.6% of those age 65 or over.
