= Nelson Dewey =

American pioneer, first Governor of Wisconsin

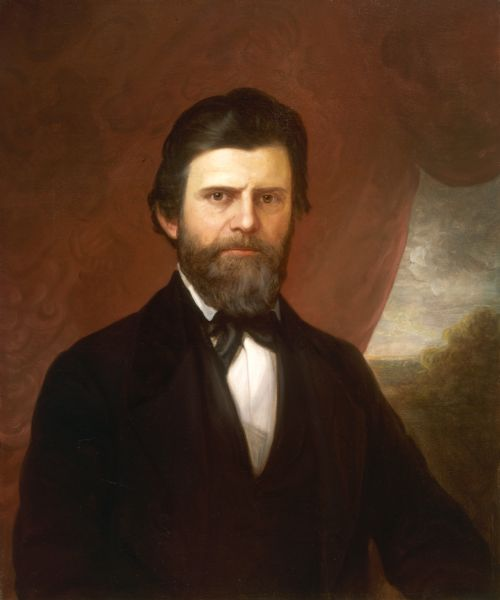
- Portrait from Wisconsin Historical Society

1st Governor of Wisconsin
- In office June 7, 1848 – January 5, 1852
- Lieutenant: John E. Holmes; Samuel W. Beall
- Preceded by: Henry Dodge (as Territorial Governor)
- Succeeded by: Leonard J. Farwell

Member of the Wisconsin Senate from the 16th district
- In office January 2, 1854 – January 7, 1856
- Preceded by: James Wilson Seaton
- Succeeded by: J. Allen Barber

12th President of the Council of the Wisconsin Territory
- In office January 5, 1846 – January 4, 1847
- Preceded by: Moses M. Strong
- Succeeded by: Horatio Wells

7th Speaker of the Legislative Assembly of the Wisconsin Territory
- In office August 3, 1840 – December 7, 1840
- Preceded by: Edward V. Whiton
- Succeeded by: David Newland

Member of the Council of the Wisconsin Territory from Grant County
- In office December 5, 1842 – January 4, 1847 Serving with John H. Rountree
- Preceded by: James Russell Vineyard
- Succeeded by: Orris McCartney

Member of the House of Representatives of the Wisconsin Territory for Grant County
- In office November 26, 1838 – December 5, 1842 Serving with Daniel Raymond Burt (1840-42) & Neely Gray (1840-42)
- Preceded by: Position established
- Succeeded by: Franklin Z. Hicks, Alonzo Platt, & Glendower M. Price

Personal details
- Born: Nelson Webster Dewey; December 19, 1813 Lebanon, Connecticut, U.S.
- Died: July 21, 1889 (aged 75) Cassville, Wisconsin, U.S.
- Resting place: Dewey Cemetery; Lancaster, Wisconsin
- Party: Democratic
- Spouse: Catherine D. Dunn (m. 1849–1889)
- Children: Charles "Charlie" Dunn Dewey^{(b. 1851; died 1859)}; Catherine "Katie" (Cole)^{(b. 1854; died 1922)}; Nelson "Nettie" Dunn Dewey^{(b. 1857; died 1929)}
- Parents: Ebenezer Dewey (father); Lucy Dewey (mother)
- Relatives: William Dewey (brother); Orin Dewey (brother); John J. Dewey (brother); Charles Dunn (father-in-law); Felix Cole (grandson)
- Profession: lawyer

Nelson Webster Dewey (December 19, 1813 – July 21, 1889) was an American lawyer, land speculator, politician, and Wisconsin pioneer. He was the first governor of Wisconsin, and also served in the Wisconsin Senate and served several years in the Wisconsin Territory government before Wisconsin achieved statehood. He was also particularly important in the development of Cassville, Wisconsin, which he had at one time hoped to make the state capitol.

== Early life ==
Dewey was born in Lebanon, Connecticut, on December 19, 1813, to Ebenezer and Lucy (née Webster) Dewey. His father's family had lived in New England since 1633, when their ancestor Thomas Due (Dewey) came to America from the county of Kent, England.

Dewey's family moved to Butternuts, New York (now called Morris) the year following his birth (Note: Because of this, some sources name him a native of New York.) and he attended school there and in Louisville, New York. At the age of 16, he began attending the Hamilton Academy in Hamilton, New York. He attended the academy for three years, and then returned to Butternut to teach.

Ebenezer Dewey, Dewey's father, was a lawyer, and wished his son to join the same profession. Dewey began studying law in 1833, first with his father, then with the law firm Hanen & Davies, then with Samuel S. Bowne in Cooperstown, New York. He left Bowne in May 1836, and in June of that year arrived in the lead-mining region of Galena, Illinois, working as a clerk for Daniels, Dennison & Co., (Note: Other sources give this company's name as the "Dennison & Brunson company".) a firm of land speculators from New York. About a week after he arrived, he moved to Cassville, Wisconsin. He became a citizen of the territory in 1836. Daniels, Dennison & Co. had purchased the land on which Cassville was built, and their plan was to develop and promote the village in the hopes that it grow and eventually be chosen as the capital of the Wisconsin Territory or of a future state.

== Territorial politics ==
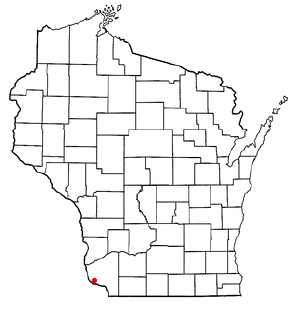
The location of Cassville within Grant County

On March 4, 1837, Dewey was elected Register of Deeds for the newly formed Grant County; he was appointed the county's Justice of the Peace by Territorial Governor Henry Dodge the same year. He was, and continued to be for the rest of his political career, a member of the Democratic Party. When Daniels, Dennison & Co.'s business plans collapsed in 1838, after Madison was chosen to be the capital, Dewey moved to Lancaster, Wisconsin, where he was admitted to the bar in an examination held by Charles Dunn, the chief justice of the Supreme Court of the Wisconsin Territory; he was appointed district attorney of Grant County that same year. As a lawyer, he entered into a partnership with J. Allen Barber, which lasted from 1840 until May 1848. Together, they became well known in Wisconsin's lead-mining region, acquiring mines and investing in mining companies.

In November 1838, Dewey was elected to the territorial assembly as representative from Grant County; he was reelected in 1840 and became that body's speaker for one session. He served as an assemblyman until 1842, when the voters of Grant County elected him to the territorial council; during the 1846 session, during which an upcoming convention which would produce a draft constitution for the State of Wisconsin was discussed, he served as the council's president. He failed to be re-elected in 1846, due to a new Whig majority in Grant County.

== Governor of Wisconsin ==
=== 1848 election ===
With the pending ratification of the new Constitution of Wisconsin, and the upcoming election for the new state's officers, the Democratic Party held a convention to nominate its candidate for Governor of Wisconsin. During the writing and attempts at ratification of the state's constitution in 1847 and 1848, the state party had become divided into two major factions, one centered in the lead-mining regions, and another centered in the eastern portion of the state. Each faction favored its own candidate for governor: Hiram Barber from the lead-region faction and Morgan L. Martin from the eastern faction; after neither candidate could gather enough votes to secure the nomination, the two factions began searching for a compromise candidate. They decided on Nelson Dewey, who was not associated with either faction. The party also hoped that Dewey might attract voters from the then-Whig majority Grant County.

The election was held on May 8, 1848; Dewey defeated Whig candidate John Hubbard Tweedy and the independent Charles Durkee, and thus became the first governor of the State of Wisconsin. John E. Holmes, also a Democrat, was elected lieutenant governor in the same election.

Also in May, Dewey's law and business partnership with Barber came to an end; by the time of its dissolution, Dewey was known to be one of the leading men in Wisconsin.

=== First term ===
Dewey's first term as governor began on June 7, 1848, and lasted until January 7, 1850. During his time as governor, Dewey oversaw the transition from the territorial to the new state government. He encouraged the development of the state's infrastructure, particularly the construction of new roads, railroads, canals, and harbors, as well as the improvement of the Fox and Wisconsin Rivers. During his administration, the State Board of Public Works was organized.

Dewey was known for opposing the spread of slavery into new states and territories and for advocating the popular election of U.S. Senators.

Near the end of his term, he married Catherine Dunn, (or Katherine) the daughter of Charles Dunn, the former chief justice of Wisconsin Territory.

=== 1849 election ===
During Dewey's first term as governor, the Wisconsin Legislature passed an act decreeing that the biennial elections for governor would begin in 1849; that year, in an election held in November, Dewey again defeated the Whig candidate, Alexander Collins, and the Free Soiler Warren Chase. Samuel W. Beall, also a Democrat, was elected lieutenant governor in the same election.

Dewey was elected the first president of the Wisconsin Historical Society the same year.

=== Second term ===
Dewey's second term began on January 7, 1850 and lasted until January 5, 1852.

Dewey lost much popular support during his terms as governor, due both to his inability to overcome the factionalism within his own party and to his association with Wisconsin's lead-mining regions, which were losing power in Wisconsin politics. He chose not to run for a third term.

== Later life ==
After his time as governor, Dewey returned to Lancaster, where he speculated in real estate. He remained active in politics, however: in 1853, Dewey ran against Chief Justice Orasmus Cole for a seat in the Wisconsin State Senate for Wisconsin's Sixteenth District; he was elected by a majority of three votes, serving a two-year term. Throughout the remainder of his life, he was a delegate to most of the state conventions of the Democratic Party. From 1854 until 1865, he was regent of the University of Wisconsin. During his time in Lancaster, Dewey served at various times as the chairman of the town board of supervisor and a member of the school board.

In 1854, Dewey and his wife Catherine began to plan to begin anew the development of Cassville, once the goal of Daniels, Dennison & Co. In 1855, he was able to purchase the village under foreclosure; he remodelled the village plot and repaired the Denniston House, a hotel which had been built by the now-defunct firm, at a cost of $15,000; his ultimate hope was that Cassville would be developed into a large city. He also acquired about 2,000 acres (8.1 km^{2}) of land northwest of Cassville, on which he built a three-story Gothic-revival mansion, which he named "Stonefield", at a cost of about $70,000; he expended another $30,000 on eleven miles (18 km) of stone fence. It was said that to have been the most modern house in Wisconsin at that time. At this time, Dewey employed around forty to fifty men as a means of returning money to Cassville; it is said that this was the origin of the prosperity of several of Cassville's residents.

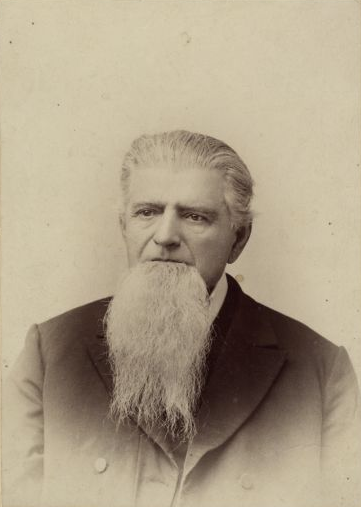
Photo of Dewey from later in life.

Dewey lived in Cassville for the rest of his life, except the time from 1858 until 1863, when he lived at Platteville, Wisconsin. In 1863, Dewey unsuccessfully ran for Lieutenant Governor; he also lost his 1869 and 1871 attempts at re-election to State Senate.

Dewey's Cassville project was attracting few people, so he began investing in a railroad line to the village. On January 2, 1873, Dewey's mansion was destroyed in a fire, and he was forced to give up the property to pay his creditors. His property passed into the ownership of Walter C. Newberry of Chicago. Also this year, Dewey lost his entire investment in the railroad line during the Panic of 1873. At some time during this period, Dewey was involved in another financial setback involving the estate of the deceased Ben Eastman, a former Congressman, of which he was the executor. Dewey returned to his law practice.

In 1874, Governor William R. Taylor appointed Dewey to the board of directors of the State Prison at Waupun; he served on the board until 1881.

On February 22, 1889, Dewey suffered a stroke while at court in Lancaster. He was paralyzed and was brought home to Cassville the next day. He was not well prior to this, and was apparently aware of the possibility of becoming paralyzed. (Note: The Teller of Lancaster reports a conversation to this effect which apparently took place the day of the stroke.) From the time of his paralysis, he was almost entirely confined to bed. He died in poverty at the Denniston House, which he had helped rebuild, a few minutes past midnight on the morning of July 21, 1889, (Note: Because of the time of his death, some sources give Dewey's death date as July 20, 1889.) after being unconscious for the previous forty-eight hours. He was seventy-five years old.

Dewey was at one time considered a wealthy man, but by the time of his death, he had little money. Dewey was buried on July 23, 1889, in the Episcopal cemetery in Lancaster, next to the graves of his brother Orin and his son Charlie.

== Personal life ==
Dewey married Catherine Dunn in 1849 during his first term as governor. The couple had three children: Charlie (1851–1859), their elder son who died while still a child, Katie (1854–1922), whose married name was later Cole, and another son Nelson Jr. (1857–1929), who at the time of Dewey's death lived in the West.

In 1886, Dewey filed for a divorce from his wife, but the matter never came to trial. Catherine eventually moved to St. Louis, Missouri, where her daughter and son-in-law lived.

Dewey had a brother named William Dewey, who survived him, and another brother, Orin, who died in 1840. He also a third brother, John J. Dewey, who was a physician who lived in Saint Paul, Minnesota and was a member of the Minnesota Territorial Legislature.

Dewey was called a "friend of the poor" and known for his generosity.

== Political views ==
Dewey was a member of the Democratic Party. He opposed the spread of slavery into new states and territories and advocated electing United States senators by popular vote. He was described as one of "the old guard that never surrendered".

== Legacy ==
Nelson Dewey State Park was created in 1935 using land from Dewey's former Stonefield estate.

An 11-mile portion of Wisconsin state highway 81 from Cassville to the intersection of state highway 35 in Grant County was designated Nelson Dewey Memorial Highway by the Wisconsin Legislature.

The former Nelson Dewey Generating Station was named after the governor.

== Footnotes ==
Party political offices
First	Democratic nominee for Governor of Wisconsin; 1848, 1849	Succeeded by Don A. J. Upham
Preceded by Henry M. Billings	Democratic nominee for Lieutenant Governor of Wisconsin; 1863	Succeeded by Densmore Maxon
Wisconsin Senate
Preceded by James Wilson Seaton	Member of the Wisconsin Senate from the 16th district 1854–1856	Succeeded by J. Allen Barber
Political offices
Preceded by Edward V. Whiton	Speaker of the Legislative Assembly of the Wisconsin Territory; 1840	Succeeded by David Newland
Preceded by Moses M. Strong	President of the Council of the Wisconsin Territory; 1846–1847	Succeeded by Horatio Wells
Preceded by Henry Dodge as Governor of Wisconsin Territory	Governor of Wisconsin; 1848–1852	Succeeded by Leonard J. Farwell
