= Attorney General Sloan =

Attorney General Sloan may refer to:

- A. Scott Sloan (1820–1895), Attorney General of Wisconsin
- Gordon McGregor Sloan (1898–1959), Attorney General of British Columbia
