= Henry Clay Sloan =

Member of the Wisconsin State Assembly

Henry C. Sloan

District Attorney of Douglas County, Wisconsin
- In office July 1895 – January 2, 1899
- Preceded by: C. J. Monson
- Succeeded by: Isaac Ross

Member of the Wisconsin State Assembly from the Douglas district
- In office January 7, 1895 – January 4, 1897
- Preceded by: Edgar G. Mills
- Succeeded by: James H. Agen (1st dist.); Jarvis White (2nd dist.)

Member of the Wisconsin State Assembly from the Outagamie 1st district
- In office January 3, 1881 – January 2, 1882
- Preceded by: John C. Peterson
- Succeeded by: Humphrey Pierce

Personal details
- Born: Henry Clay Sloan; August 12, 1846 DeRuyter, New York, U.S.
- Died: February 15, 1915 (aged 68) Appleton, Wisconsin, U.S.
- Party: Republican; Democratic (before 1882)
- Spouse: Helen Lois Phinney (m. 1879)
- Children: None
- Parents: A. Scott Sloan (father); Ann (Dodge) Sloan (mother)
- Relatives: Ithamar Sloan (uncle)
- Profession: lawyer, politician

Military service
- Allegiance: United States
- Branch/service: United States Volunteers; Union Army; United States Army
- Years of service: 1863–1866 (USV); 1866–1871 (USA)
- Rank: 1st Lieutenant, USV; 1st Lieutenant, USA
- Unit: 5th Reg. Wis. Vol. Infantry; 48th Reg. Wis. Vol. Infantry; 4th Reg. U.S. Infantry
- Battles/wars: American Civil War: Overland Campaign; Battle of the Wilderness; Battle of Spotsylvania Court House; Battle of Cold Harbor; Siege of Petersburg

Henry Clay Sloan (August 12, 1846 – January 19, 1915) was an American lawyer and politician. He served two non-consecutive terms in the Wisconsin State Assembly. His father, A. Scott Sloan, and uncle, Ithamar Sloan, both served in the United States House of Representatives.

== Early life ==
Henry C. Sloan was born in DeRuyter, Madison County, New York, on August 12, 1846. As a child, he moved west with his parents in 1854, settling at Beaver Dam, Wisconsin, where he was raised and educated. When he was old enough, he was sent to New York City to study law with his uncle.

== Military service ==
While in New York, he ran away from his uncle's home and joined up with a New York regiment for service in the Union Army in the American Civil War. In December 1863, he transferred to the 5th Wisconsin Infantry Regiment and served as a private in Company D. He served with the 5th Wisconsin Infantry in the Army of the Potomac in the eastern theater of the war and participated in the battles at the Wilderness, Spotsylvania Courthouse, North Anna, Cold Harbor, and the Siege of Petersburg. In July 1864, he was commissioned as a 2nd lieutenant in the United States Marine Corps, but when it was determined that he was just 17 years old, he was forced to resign. He re-enlisted with the Wisconsin volunteers and was commissioned 1st lieutenant of Company I in the new 48th Wisconsin Infantry Regiment.

He served with the 48th Wisconsin Infantry through the end of the war, and then secured a commission as a 2nd lieutenant in the regular U.S. Army. He was promoted to 1st lieutenant in July 1866 and served with the 4th U.S. Infantry Regiment through the end of 1870, working on railroad construction in the west.

== Legal and political career ==
After leaving the Army, Sloan returned to studying law, this time at his father's office in Beaver Dam. He was admitted to the bar on March 5, 1872, and practiced law at Beaver Dam until 1875, when he moved to Appleton, Wisconsin. At Appleton, he was quickly elected city attorney, serving from 1876 through 1880. In the Fall of 1880, he was elected to the Wisconsin State Assembly, serving in the 1881 session.

After the 1881 legislative session, he moved to Milwaukee and worked in a legal partnership with Winfield Smith until 1889. During this time he changed his political affiliation from Democratic to Republican and remained a devoted Republican for the rest of his life.

He then moved to Superior, Wisconsin, and engaged in the real estate business. At Superior, he was again elected city attorney; he served on the board of public works and was president of the board of education. He was elected to his second term in the State Assembly in 1894, representing Douglas County. After the 1895 legislative session, he was appointed district attorney of Douglas County to fill the unexpired term of C. J. Monson, who had died unexpectedly. He was subsequently elected to a full term as district attorney in the 1896 general election, serving through 1898.

In 1901, he returned to Appleton, where he resumed his legal practice, working until his death in 1915. Sloan died January 19, 1915, after an abscess burst on his lung.

== Personal life and family ==
Henry Sloan was one of eight children born to A. Scott Sloan and his wife Mary Angeline "Ann" (née Dodge). A. Scott Sloan was a prominent lawyer in early Wisconsin and served as a U.S. congressman, Wisconsin Attorney General, and Wisconsin circuit court judge. Henry Sloan's uncle, Ithamar Sloan, was also a prominent lawyer and served as a U.S. congressman.

Henry Sloan married Helen Lois Phinney of Green Lake, Wisconsin, on November 19, 1879. Helen Phinney was a descendant of John Howland, one of the signers of the Mayflower Compact. They had no children.

== Electoral history ==
=== Wisconsin Assembly (1880) ===
Wisconsin Assembly, Outagamie 1st District Election, 1880
Party	Candidate	Votes	%	±%
General Election, November 2, 1880
Democratic	Henry C. Sloan	3,088	97.41%	
Greenback	L. L. Randale	82	2.59%	
Plurality		3,006	94.83%	
Total votes		3,170	100.0%	+45.68%
Democratic gain from Greenback				

=== Wisconsin Assembly (1894) ===
Wisconsin Assembly, Douglas District Election, 1894
Party	Candidate	Votes	%	±%
General Election, November 6, 1894
Republican	Henry C. Sloan	3,066	59.25%	+8.63%
Democratic	John J. Atkinson	1,080	20.87%	−21.83%
Populist	A. G. Newberg	990	19.13%	+12.45%
Independent Republican	F. E. C. Bryant	39	0.75%	
Plurality		1,986	38.38%	+30.46%
Total votes		5,175	100.0%	-7.11%
Republican hold				

Wisconsin State Assembly
Preceded by John C. Peterson	Member of the Wisconsin State Assembly from the Outagamie 1st district January 3, 1881 – January 2, 1882	Succeeded by Humphrey Pierce
Preceded by Edgar G. Mills	Member of the Wisconsin State Assembly from the Douglas district January 7, 1895 – January 4, 1897	Succeeded by James H. Agen (1st dist.); Jarvis White (2nd dist.)
Legal offices
Preceded by C. J. Monson	District Attorney of Douglas County, Wisconsin; July 1895 – January 2, 1899	Succeeded by Isaac Ross
