= Ithamar Sloan =

American lawyer and politician (1822–1898)

I. C. Sloan
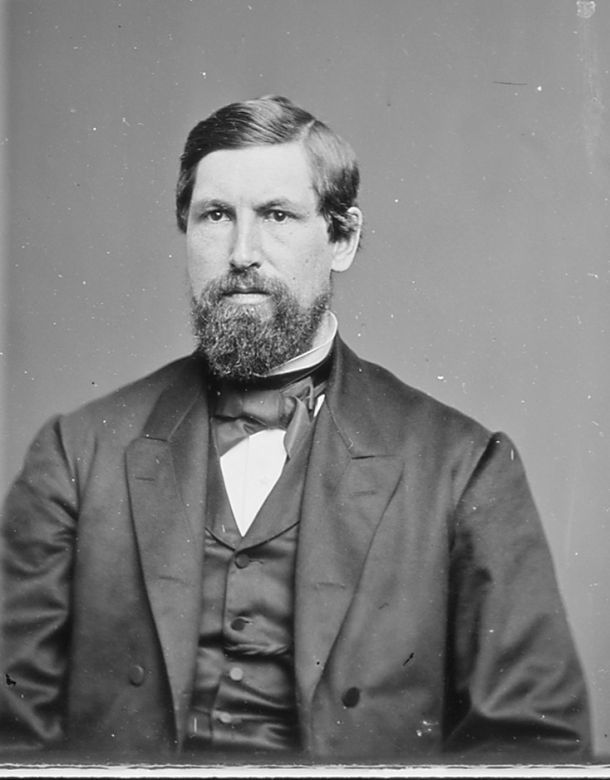

Member of the U.S. House of Representatives from Wisconsin's 2nd district
- In office March 4, 1863 – March 3, 1867
- Preceded by: Walter D. McIndoe
- Succeeded by: Benjamin F. Hopkins

District Attorney of Rock County, Wisconsin
- In office January 3, 1859 – January 1, 1863
- Preceded by: W. D. Parker
- Succeeded by: John R. Bennett

Personal details
- Born: Ithamar Conkey Sloan; May 9, 1822 Morrisville, New York, U.S.
- Died: December 24, 1898 (aged 76) Janesville, Wisconsin, U.S.
- Cause of death: Stroke
- Resting place: Oak Hill Cemetery, Janesville
- Party: Republican; Reform Coalition (1873); Liberal Republican (1872–1878)
- Spouse: Celestia Eldridge Sears (m. 1854–1898)
- Children: Francis S. Sloan^{(b.ca.1855; died young)}; Charles Ithamar Sloan^{(b. 1857; died 1934)}; Andrew C. Sloan^{(b. 1859; died 1865)}; Mary Francis Sloan^{(b. 1862; died 1882)}; Henry Scott Sloan^{(b. 1867; died 1930)}; Unnamed child^{(b. 1870; died 1870)}; Horace Greeley Sloan^{(b. 1871; died 1922)}
- Relatives: A. Scott Sloan (brother); Henry Clay Sloan (nephew)
- Profession: Lawyer, politician

Ithamar Conkey Sloan (May 9, 1822 – December 24, 1898) was an American lawyer, politician, and Wisconsin pioneer. He served two terms in the U.S. House of Representatives, representing Wisconsin's 2nd congressional district from 1863 to 1867. Subsequently, he served as assistant attorney general of Wisconsin under his brother, A. Scott Sloan; in that capacity, he was special counsel for the state of Wisconsin and successfully defended the state's Granger Laws; during those years, he also represented Lavinia Goodell in her petitions to become the first woman admitted to practice law in Wisconsin. Later in life, he became dean of the law department of the University of Wisconsin, and was one of the founders of the State Bar of Wisconsin.

Politically, Sloan was a member of the Republican Party during his years in Congress, but became a Liberal Republican in the 1870s, joining the short-lived Reform Coalition with the Democrats. He served as assistant attorney general during the Reform coalition years, before rejoining the Republican Party in the late 1870s.

His brother, A. Scott Sloan, and nephew, Henry Clay Sloan, were also prominent lawyers and politicians in early Wisconsin. In historical documents his name is often abbreviated as I. C. Sloan.

== Early life and career ==
Ithamar C. Sloan was born in Morrisville, New York, in 1822. He attended common schools and an academy in that vicinity, and then studied law in the office of Timothy Jenkins in Oneida County, New York. Around the time of his bar admission, in 1848, he was elected to his first public office, serving as the first village clerk of Canastota, New York. He practiced law in Oneida County until 1853, when he left New York to seek opportunity in the new state of Wisconsin.

Arriving in Wisconsin, Sloan chose to settle in Janesville, Wisconsin, where he made his home and started a legal practice. He was admitted to the practice of law in Wisconsin in December 1853, and formed a legal partnership with LaFayette Patten, another recent arrival from New York. Within a few years, their partnership expanded to include John R. Bennett, and expanded into real estate representation.

== Wisconsin political career ==
Shortly after arriving in Wisconsin, Sloan became involved with the nascent Republican Party, and by 1856, he was considered a potential Republican candidate for circuit court judge. At the start of the 2nd term of the Janesville city council that April, Sloan was elected city attorney of Janesville, his first public office in his new state.

In 1857, Sloan sought his district nomination for Wisconsin State Assembly, but fell short at the Republican convention to William A. Lawrence. The following spring, Sloan was elected without opposition to the Janesville city council. That fall, the county Republican convention nominated Sloan for district attorney of Rock County, Wisconsin, and he was elected in November for a two-year term. Shortly after taking office as district attorney, he resigned from his seat on the city council. He won a second two-year term as district attorney in 1860.

During these years, Sloan's reputation continued to grow in the Wisconsin legal community. At the funeral of Chief Justice Edward V. Whiton in 1859, Sloan was selected to serve as an honorary pallbearer. Sloan also continued to rise in prominence in the Republican Party of Wisconsin, and was an active campaigner on behalf of the state Republican ticket in the 1859 elections.

In the spring of 1860, Sloan's brother, A. Scott Sloan, was the Republican candidate for Wisconsin Supreme Court. During that campaign, Ithamar Sloan was called to be a sort of informal character witness for his brother's political positions, as his brother thought it would be improper to directly comment on issues that may come before the court. In particular, Ithamar Sloan had to validate for the Republican audience that his brother was committed to a "states rights" position, which at that time meant defying the U.S. Supreme Court ruling in the case of Ableman v. Booth. Sloan narrowly lost the Supreme Court election to incumbent Luther S. Dixon, but was elected to Congress later that year from Wisconsin's northeastern district.

Also that year, in the lead-up to the 1860 United States presidential election, Sloan became an active supporter of William H. Seward, and a member of the Radical Republican Wide Awakes club. But he and the Rock County Republicans quickly embraced Abraham Lincoln after his nomination, and Sloan was again a leading campaigner for the Republican ticket in the fall election.

After Lincoln's victory and the start of the American Civil War in early 1861, Sloan became a vocal supporter of the Union cause. He became one of the organizers and leading donors to the Rock County soldier's relief fund, which—in the era of the Civil War—was responsible for much of the financial upkeep of soldiers' families during their service.

=== Congress ===
Wisconsin's 2nd congressional district 1862–1871

In 1862, Sloan ran for a seat in the U.S. House of Representatives. This was the first congressional election after the 1860 reapportionment, in which Wisconsin's delegation had doubled from 3 to 6 members. the new 2nd congressional district was anchored by Sloan's Rock County, and neighboring Dane County, and also contained the less-populated Columbia and Jefferson counties. There was no incumbent representative living in the new district.

Sloan came to the Republican congressional district convention with the full support of the Rock County delegation, but faced an intense fight for the nomination from Benjamin F. Hopkins, who was the candidate of Dane County boss Elisha W. Keyes with the full support of the Dane County delegation; the other county delegations split among various local favorites. Sloan began picking up delegates after the first few rounds of voting; Hopkins dropped out after the 13th ballot, on instruction from Keyes, in favor of the popular Madison newspaper publisher David Atwood. Atwood rallied the Dane County delegation, and picked up significant support from Columbia County, but Sloan also benefited from the consolidation. Sloan won the nomination on the 16th ballot, receiving 25 delegate votes to Atwood's 21.

The Democrats of the 2nd district nominated Joshua J. Guppey, a former county judge who was then serving as colonel of the 23rd Wisconsin Infantry Regiment in the western theater of the American Civil War. Guppey, who had previously been elected as a Democrat, was not considered an active member of the party since the start of the war, but received the nomination because of his potential to appeal to the more pro-Union constituency in the 2nd district. There was some dispute about whether Guppey actually accepted the party's nomination; regardless, he did not return to Wisconsin to campaign. The Wisconsin State Journal speculated that the effort to secure the nomination for Guppey was entirely concocted by Judge Levi Baker Vilas to remove Guppey from his regiment in order to see his son, William F. Vilas, promoted to colonel.

1862 was a strong Democratic year in the congressional elections, but Sloan easily prevailed, receiving 55% of the vote in Wisconsin's 2nd congressional district. Shortly after the election, Guppey declared himself a Republican. Sloan was sworn in as a member of the 38th U.S. Congress on March 4, 1863. He remained very politically active in Wisconsin during his congressional term. By 1864, the Union was faring much better in the war, and Republican politics recovered accordingly; Sloan was re-elected by a wide margin in 1864, defeating former Wisconsin attorney general George Baldwin Smith. The question of the not-yet-ratified Thirteenth Amendment became an issue in the campaign, as Smith and his political allies tried to suggest that abolishing slavery would exacerbate the war. Sloan voted with the majority to ratify the amendment shortly after the election; the Civil War ended a few months later.

Sloan attempted to run for re-election again in 1866, but at the nominating convention, he faced a rematch with Benjamin F. Hopkins. This time, Hopkins arrived with the solid support of his Dane County delegation, with fractures in Sloan's Rock County delegation. Columbia and Jefferson counties also sent delegations favoring candidates from their own counties, Israel Holmes and Lucien B. Caswell, respectively. Another long convention battle ensued over the course of several days; Hopkins finally prevailed on the 136th ballot.

=== After congress ===
Sloan immediately returned to his legal practice in Janesville after his term in Congress expired. He formed a new partnership with Harmon S. Conger, a former U.S. representative from New York; that partnership endured until Conger was elected a Wisconsin circuit court judge in 1870.

Wisconsin's 1st congressional district 1872–1881

Sloan remained highly active in politics, campaigning for the Republican ticket in the 1867 state elections and 1868 federal elections. In 1870, President Ulysses S. Grant appointed Sloan to the board of visitors of the United States Military Academy. He was considered a potential candidate for chairman of the Republican state central committee in 1871.

In the tumultuous 1872 election, Sloan split with Grant and the Republican Party and endorsed Liberal Republican Horace Greeley, in a coalition with the Democratic Party. That fall, Sloan accepted the Greeley coalition nomination for U.S. House of Representatives. By 1872, Rock County had shifted into the 1st congressional district, with Walworth, Waukesha, Racine, and Kenosha counties. In the general election, Sloan lost in a landslide to Charles G. Williams, another prominent Janesville lawyer, running on the regular Republican ticket.

Sloan did not reconcile with the Republican Party after the election, and instead became a leader of the Liberal Republicans in Wisconsin. He and his brother embraced the Reform Coalition, a political alliance of Democrats, Liberal Republicans, and Grangers, seeking railroad regulation and other populist reforms.

=== Whiting v. Sheboygan & Fond du Lac Railroad Co. ===
During the preceding years, Sloan had become involved in the case of Warren Whiting, a Wisconsin resident (and former state legislator) who brought suit against the government of Fond du Lac County, Wisconsin, and the Sheboygan and Fond du Lac Railroad Company. At issue was an 1867 Wisconsin law which authorized counties to provide up to $150,000 to fund private railroad construction, and to levy a tax on residents to pay for it. Sloan and Conger represented Whiting before the Wisconsin Supreme Court and won a significant victory; the court majority ruled that the state could not use public money to fund a private enterprise. Since the outcome of the lawsuit invalidated bonds which had already been issued, it resulted in another lawsuit from the bondholders in federal court to compel the county to fulfill its obligation. Immediately after the 1872 election, Sloan traveled to Washington, D.C., to argue again for Whiting; the U.S. Supreme Court, however, ruled in favor of the railroads, finding that the railroads—although privately owned—were public highways for legal purposes, and the state could impose taxes for their construction, use, and maintenance.

=== Assistant attorney general ===
The Reform coalition won the 1873 elections in Wisconsin, and Sloan's brother, A. Scott Sloan, was elected attorney general of Wisconsin on the Reform ticket. Immediately after his brother was sworn in, Ithamar Sloan was appointed assistant attorney general.

Sloan's chief contribution as assistant attorney general was serving as special counsel for the government in the lawsuits defending the signature legislation of the Reform government, 1874 Wisconsin Act 273, known commonly as the "Potter Law". The railroads sued the state in federal court, and Sloan went on to represent the state in those cases, earning notoriety in state newspapers as the federal district court declined to act on behalf of the railroads. Sloan and his Reform allies then won a resounding victory at the Wisconsin Supreme Court in the case Attorney General v. Chicago & Northwestern Railway Co.; writing for the court, the new chief justice, Edward G. Ryan, delivered a strident opinion in favor of state regulatory power, regarded as one of the most consequential decisions in the history of the Wisconsin Supreme Court.

The Reform coalition was mostly defeated in the 1875 elections, but Sloan's brother won re-election as attorney general, and Sloan was retained as assistant attorney general.

=== Lavinia Goodell bar admission ===
During his first year as assistant attorney general, Sloan played an important role in the history of the legal profession in Wisconsin, when he represented Lavinia Goodell in her effort to become the first female admitted to practice law in Wisconsin. As Goodell was prohibited from making her own case before the Wisconsin Supreme Court, Sloan made the case for her, using the brief she had written. The Supreme Court denied her on that attempt, with Chief Justice Edward G. Ryan clearly opposed to the idea. Ryan's legal opinion relied on the rationale that the Wisconsin Legislature had intentionally used male-only pronouns in writing legislation relating to the practice of law in Wisconsin. Goodell would then pressure the legislature to amend the law to utilize gender-neutral language, which it did in 1877, allowing Goodell to reapply. Sloan again represented her before the Supreme Court; on June 18, 1879, Goodell won the right to become the first woman admitted to practice law in Wisconsin.

== Later years ==
In the year after he left office as assistant attorney general, he also became one of the founders of the State Bar of Wisconsin, and was instrumental in its initial organization, alongside state supreme court chief justice Edward G. Ryan. Prior to 1878, bar admission and standards in Wisconsin were governed largely by bars of the county or circuit court.

In the late 1870s, Sloan also reconciled himself with the Republican Party, though he mostly avoided overt political activity for the remainder of his life.

Sloan remained in Madison, Wisconsin, for many years after leaving office. He became a professor of law at the University of Wisconsin, and was dean of the law faculty. He retired in 1888 and returned to Janesville.

== Personal life and family ==
Ithamar Conkey Sloan was the second of three sons born to Andrew Scott Sloan, of Madison County, New York, and his wife Mehitable (née Conkey). Andrew S. Sloan was the first lawyer to settle in the town of Morrisville, New York, and was prominent in the legal community of Madison County, serving as a judge of the New York Court of Common Pleas, and county clerk. Andrew Sloan's father, David Sloan served as a volunteer in the Massachusetts militia during the American Revolutionary War.

Ithamar's elder brother, also named Andrew Scott Sloan (more commonly known as "A. Scott Sloan"), was also a Wisconsin pioneer, but settled in Dodge County, Wisconsin, where he served as a mayor of Beaver Dam, state legislator, and circuit judge, before being elected to the 37th U.S. Congress, and serving as the 11th attorney general of Wisconsin.

A. Scott Sloan's son, Henry Clay Sloan, also became a successful lawyer and served two terms as a member of the Wisconsin State Assembly, and served as district attorney of Douglas County, Wisconsin.

Ithamar Conkey Sloan married Celestia Eldridge Sears on September 5, 1854, in Madison County, New York. They had seven children together, though three died in childhood, and their only daughter died at age 20.

Sloan died of a stroke at his home in Janesville, Wisconsin, on December 24, 1898, and was interred in Oak Hill Cemetery in Janesville.

== Electoral history ==
=== U.S. House of Representatives, Wisconsin's 2nd district (1862, 1864) ===
Wisconsin's 2nd Congressional District Election, 1862
Party	Candidate	Votes	%	±%
General Election, November 4, 1862
Republican	Ithamar C. Sloan	13,107	54.43%	−6.73pp
Democratic	Joshua J. Guppey	10,974	45.57%	
Plurality		2,133	8.86%	
Total votes		24,081	100.0%	-59.34%
Republican hold				

Wisconsin's 2nd Congressional District Election, 1864
Party	Candidate	Votes	%	±%
General Election, November 8, 1864
National Union	Ithamar C. Sloan (incumbent)	15,148	60.31%	+5.88pp
Democratic	George Baldwin Smith	9,969	39.69%	
Plurality		5,179	20.62%	
Total votes		25,117	100.0%	+4.30%
Republican hold				

=== U.S. House of Representatives, Wisconsin's 1st district (1872) ===
Wisconsin's 2nd Congressional District Election, 1872
Party	Candidate	Votes	%	±%
General Election, November 5, 1872
Republican	Charles G. Williams	15,666	62.55%	+20.03pp
Liberal Republican	Ithamar C. Sloan	9,380	37.45%	
Plurality		6,286	25.10%	
Total votes		25,046	100.0%	-13.06%
Republican gain from Democratic				

U.S. House of Representatives
Preceded by Walter D. McIndoe	Member of the U.S. House of Representatives from Wisconsin's 2nd congressional district March 4, 1863 – March 3, 1867	Succeeded by Benjamin F. Hopkins
Legal offices
Preceded by W. D. Parker	District Attorney of Rock County, Wisconsin; January 1, 1859 – January 1, 1863	Succeeded by John R. Bennett
