= Kate Kane Rossi =

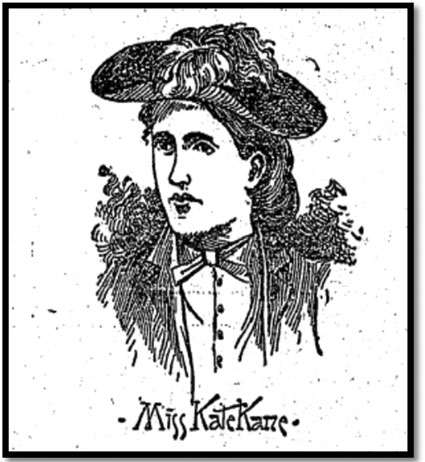
- Milwaukee Journal, 1891
- Born: June 16, 1855; Wheeling
- Died: November 21, 1928 (aged 73); Palos Park
- Occupation: Lawyer

Kate Kane Rossi (June 16, 1855– November 21, 1928) was an American lawyer. She was the first female lawyer to practice in Milwaukee, Wisconsin, the second female lawyer admitted to practice law in Wisconsin, and the eighth female lawyer admitted to practice law before the U.S. Supreme Court.

Kate Kane was born on June 16, 1855 in Wheeling, West Virginia to Irish parents. Her family moved to Wisconsin when she was a child. She attended Oshkosh Normal School in 1874-75 and worked briefly as a teacher in La Crosse, Wisconsin. She attended the University of Michigan Law School in 1876- 77 and, like Wisconsin's first female lawyer Lavinia Goodell, read law in the offices of Pliny Norcross and A. A. Jackson in Janesville, Wisconsin. She was admitted to the bar in Janesville in 1878, then relocated to Milwaukee and was admitted to the bar there the following year. She was admitted to the bar of the Wisconsin Supreme Court in 1881. Her Wisconsin legal career came to an end in 1883. After Judge James Mallory assigned a defendant who had specifically requested Kane to a male attorney and political supporter, she threw a glass of water in Mallory's face, later saying "Judge Mallory has been trying to drive me out of this court; he has continuously insulted and misused me." She was imprisoned for refusing to pay a contempt of court fine and subjected to misogynistic ridicule in the press.

In 1884 she was admitted to the bar in Illinois and began practicing law in Chicago. Many of her clients were marginalized in society, from the working classes, immigrants, women, or African-Americans. One of her most prominent trials was in 1885, when she served on the defense team for three Italian immigrants accused of what was called the Chicago Trunk Murder. She also successfully defended activist Lizzie Holmes following the 1886 arrest of the staff Arbeiter Zeitung in a post-Haymarket bombing crackdown. She was involved in a number of physical altercations, including allegedly chasing her neighbor with a broom, breaking a parasol over the head of an assistant city prosecutor, slapping an attorney and a policeman in open court on separate occasions, and being arrested for disorderly conduct in the office of Chicago Mayor Fred Busse.

Kate Kane Rossi died on 21 November 1928 in Palos Park.

== Personal life ==
In 1895, she married Vincenzo Rossi.
