= 1863 Wisconsin Supreme Court Chief Justice election =

- April 7, 1863
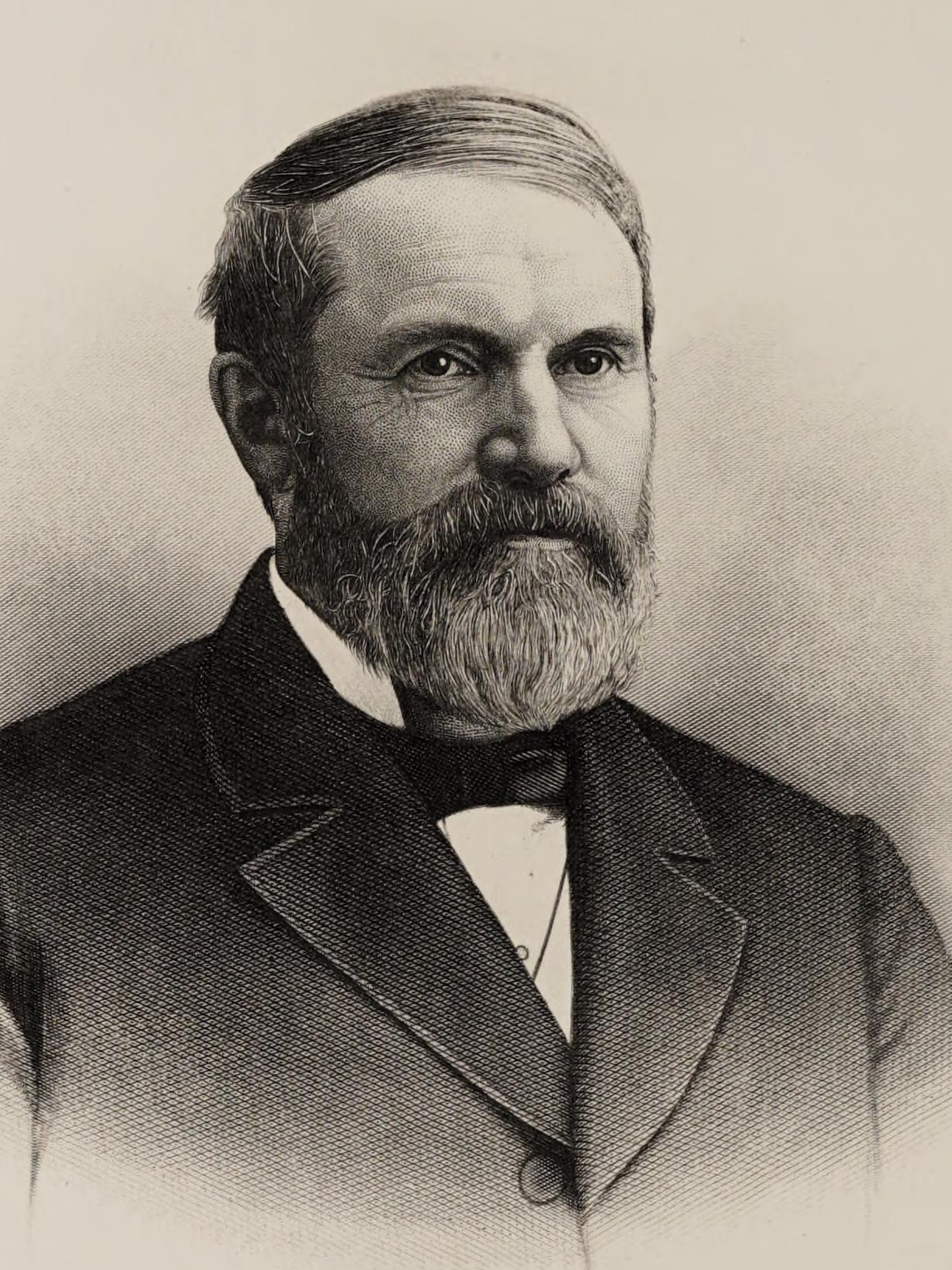

Candidate	Luther S. Dixon	Montgomery Morrison Cothren
Party	Republican	Democratic
Popular vote	61,388	58,587
Percentage	50.98%	48.65%
Justice before election
Luther S. Dixon
Republican
Elected Justice
Luther S. Dixon
Republican

The 1863 Wisconsin Supreme Court Chief Justice election was held on Tuesday, April 3, 1863, to elect the chief justice of the Wisconsin Supreme Court. Incumbent chief justice Luther S. Dixon was re-elected.

== Background ==
Incumbent chief justice Luther S. Dixon had been appointed to the chief justice seat in 1860, and was elected to a partial term that April after winning a narrow victory as an independent candidate in a special election.

The 1863 election was a regularly scheduled election, and took place during the American Civil War. While serving on the court, Dixon (the incumbent) had involved in the state's contributions to the Union effort. Dixon was active in the Wisconsin militia as captain of the Madison militia company, the "Hickory Guards". At the outbreak of the American Civil War, he had attempted to enter the Union Army, but had been dissuaded by Governor Randall who argued that he could do more for the country by staying in his position as chief justice than he could on a battlefield. During the war, Dixon was involved in recruiting and training troops to prepare them for service in the army. At the same time, Dixon had been regarded as a prospective potential candidate for President Abraham Lincoln to nominate for appointment to the United States Supreme Court (though he was ultimately not nominated).

Wisconsin had enacted laws allowing for absentee ballots in its elections. This was adopted amid the American Civil War.

== Campaign ==
The election was tightly contested. Dixon was nominated by the Republican Party. The Democratic Party nominated Montgomery Morrison Cothren, who ran on an anti-war platform.

== Results ==
Dixon won election, leading Cothren by a margin of more than 2.3%. Cothren had won a majority of votes cast in-person. However, Dixon prevailed due to his lead in the absentee votescast through mail by the state's Union Army soldiers in the field.

1863 Wisconsin Supreme Court Chief Justice election
Party	Candidate	Votes	%	±%
General election (April 7, 1863)
Republican	Luther S. Dixon (incumbent)	61,388	50.98	
Democratic	Montgomery Morrison Cothren	58,587	48.65	
	Scattering	442	0.37	
Plurality		2,801	2.33	
Total votes		120,417	100.	
