= Montgomery Morrison Cothren =

19th century American politician

Montgomery M. Cothren

25th Mayor of Mineral Point, Wisconsin
- In office April 1887 – April 1888
- Preceded by: Charles Gillmann
- Succeeded by: Joseph F. LaMalle

Wisconsin Circuit Court Judge for the 5th Circuit
- In office January 1, 1877 – January 1, 1883
- Preceded by: Joseph Trotter Mills
- Succeeded by: George Clementson
- In office June 1, 1853 – May 31, 1864
- Preceded by: Mortimer M. Jackson
- Succeeded by: Joseph Trotter Mills

Member of the Wisconsin Senate from the 5th district
- In office January 1, 1849 – January 1, 1851
- Preceded by: Henry M. Billings
- Succeeded by: Levi Sterling

Representative to the Legislative Assembly of the Wisconsin Territory from Iowa, Lafayette, and Richland counties
- In office October 18, 1847 – March 13, 1848 Serving with Timothy Burns and Charles Pole
- Preceded by: Timothy Burns, James D. Jenkins, and Thomas Chilton
- Succeeded by: Position abolished

Personal details
- Born: September 18, 1819 Jerusalem, New York, U.S.
- Died: October 27, 1888 (aged 69) Calamine, Wisconsin, U.S.
- Cause of death: Bilious fever
- Resting place: Graceland Cemetery, Mineral Point, Wisconsin
- Party: Democratic
- Spouse: Esther Marie Pulford (m. 1848–1888)
- Children: Cordelia M. Cothern^{(died 1872)}; Clara Weed (Ladd)^{(b. 1852; died 1921)}
- Occupation: Lawyer, judge

Montgomery Morrison Cothren (September 18, 1819 – October 27, 1888) was an American lawyer, Democratic politician, and Wisconsin pioneer. He served 18 years as a Wisconsin circuit court judge, and was a member of the Wisconsin State Senate.

== Biography ==
Montgomery Cothren was born in Jerusalem, New York, in 1819, and, as a child, moved west to the Michigan Territory with his parents. He worked on his father's farm near Kalamazoo until age 19. He had some common school education in New York, but had little formal education in the Michigan Territory. Nevertheless, he studied the legal profession in his free time. At age 19, he went to the lead mining region of the Wisconsin Territory and taught school. He continued to study the law in his free time, and was admitted to the bar in 1843. Shortly after, he was also chosen as Clerk of the County Board of Iowa County, and moved to Mineral Point, where he would reside for the rest of his life.

That same year, he became a junior partner to attorney Parley Eaton in a firm known as Eaton & Cothren, and began to distinguish himself in the legal profession. By 1847, he had won the approval of his community and was elected to the Territorial Legislature for the 1847 special session, and subsequently to the 1848 session. After the establishment of the Wisconsin state government, in the fall of 1848 he won election to the Wisconsin State Senate, serving in the 1849 and 1850 sessions. He was chairman of the Senate Judiciary Committee in 1849 and led a commission of lawyers in compiling the revised statutes of 1849—the first compilation of the state's laws.

He became a prominent member of the Democratic Party in Wisconsin and, in the fall of 1852, he was nominated by the party for Wisconsin circuit court judge in the 5th circuit, and was also chosen as a state at-large presidential elector for Franklin Pierce. Cothren won both elections, defeating incumbent Judge Mortimer M. Jackson, and representing Wisconsin in the election of Franklin Pierce. Cothren was re-elected to another six-year term in 1858, and in 1863, he was the Democratic nominee for Chief Justice of the Wisconsin Supreme Court, but was defeated by the incumbent, Luther S. Dixon.

He did not stand for re-election in 1864 and left office that spring to resume his law practice. He returned to politics in 1876 and was elected to a final six-year term as circuit court judge. Over these six years, he would stand for office three more times and lost all three elections. In 1879, he was defeated in the election for Wisconsin Supreme Court; in 1880, he lost election to the United States House of Representatives in the 3rd congressional district; in 1882, he lost his bid for re-election in his circuit court seat.

Cothren died at his home in Calamine, Wisconsin, from bilious fever in 1888.

== Electoral history ==
=== Wisconsin Supreme Court (1863) ===
1863 Wisconsin Supreme Court Chief Justice election
Party	Candidate	Votes	%	±%
General Election, April 7, 1863
Republican	Luther S. Dixon (incumbent)	61,388	50.98%	
Democratic	Montgomery Morrison Cothren	58,587	48.65%	
	Scattering	442	0.37%	
Plurality		2,801	2.33%	
Total votes		120,417	100.0%	
Republican hold				

Wisconsin Senate
Preceded by Henry M. Billings	Member of the Wisconsin Senate from the 5th district January 1, 1849 – January 1, 1851	Succeeded by Levi Sterling
Political offices
Preceded by Charles Gillmann	Mayor of Mineral Point, Wisconsin; April 1887 – April 1888	Succeeded by Joseph F. LaMalle
Legal offices
Preceded by Mortimer M. Jackson	Wisconsin Circuit Court Judge for the 5th Circuit; June 1, 1853 – May 31, 1864	Succeeded by Joseph Trotter Mills
Preceded by Joseph Trotter Mills	Wisconsin Circuit Court Judge for the 5th Circuit; January 1, 1877 – January 1, 1883	Succeeded by George Clementson
