= John Black (Wisconsin politician) =

19th century American politician

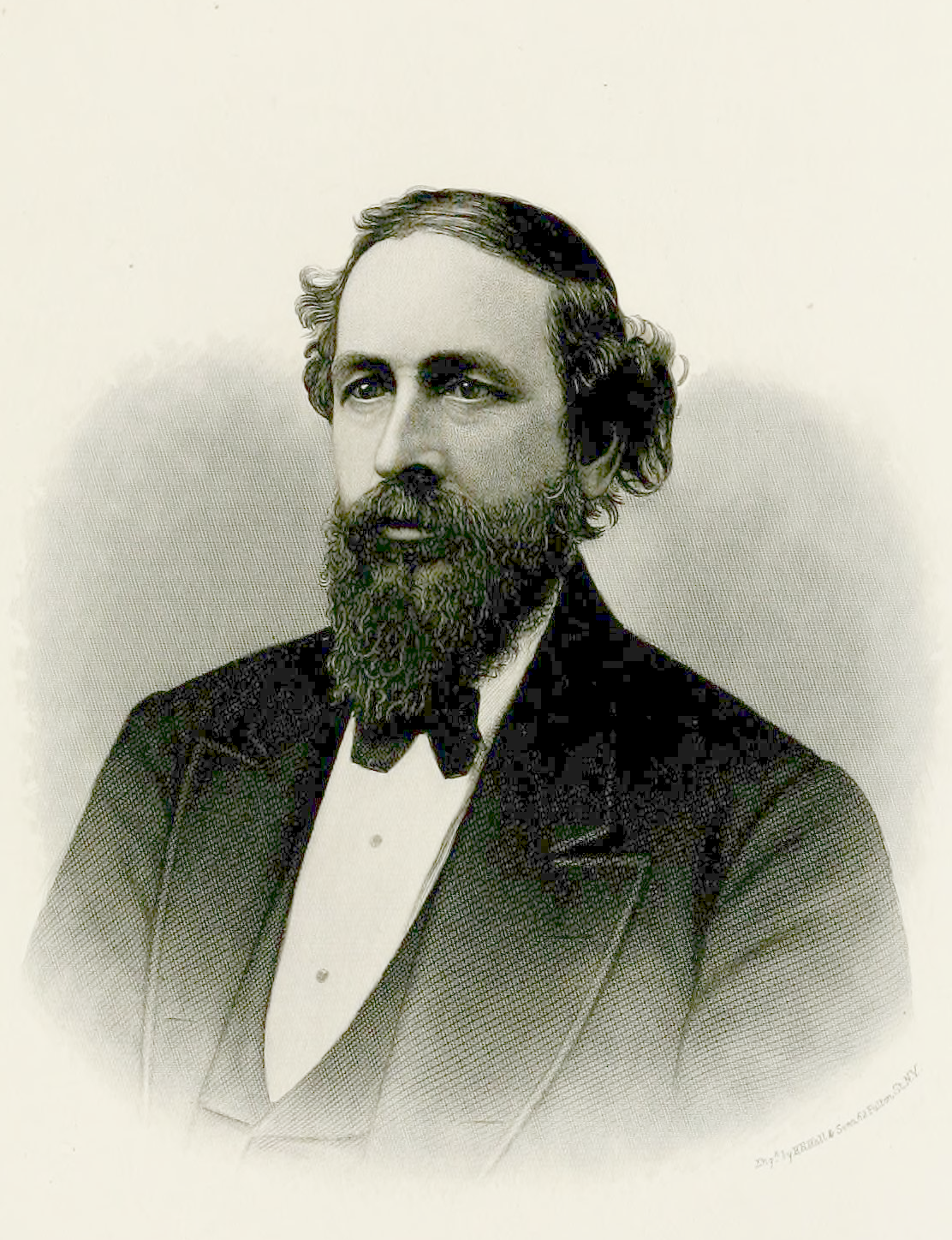
- Portrait from the United States biographical dictionary and portrait gallery of eminent and self-made men; Wisconsin volume (1877)

24th Mayor of Milwaukee
- In office April 1878 – April 1880
- Preceded by: Ammi R. Butler
- Succeeded by: Thomas H. Brown

Member of the Wisconsin Senate from the 6th district
- In office January 5, 1874 – January 3, 1876
- Preceded by: John L. Mitchell
- Succeeded by: John L. Mitchell

Member of the Wisconsin State Assembly from the Milwaukee 3rd district
- In office January 1, 1872 – January 6, 1873
- Preceded by: James Hoye
- Succeeded by: James McGrath

Personal details
- Born: Jean Schwartz; August 16, 1830 Bitche, Lorraine, France
- Died: October 25, 1899 (aged 69) Milwaukee, Wisconsin, U.S.
- Resting place: Calvary Cemetery, Milwaukee, Wisconsin
- Spouse: Elizabeth M. Schoeffel (died 1891)
- Children: Elizabeth M. Black; (b. 1856; died 1939)
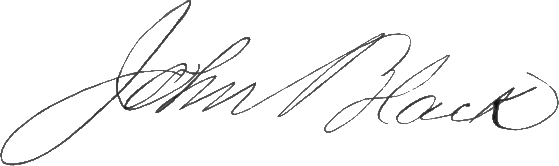
- Signature

John Black (born Jean Schwartz; August 16, 1830 – October 25, 1899) was a French American immigrant and Democratic politician. He served as the 24th mayor of Milwaukee, Wisconsin, and represented Milwaukee County for three years in the Wisconsin Legislature.

== Biography ==
Black was born near Bitche, Lorraine, France. He attended college in Metz before moving with his family to the United States in 1844, settling near Lockport, New York. He moved with his wife to Milwaukee in 1857, where he started a wholesale wine and liquor business. Black was active in politics, having served in the Wisconsin State Assembly, the Wisconsin State Senate, the Milwaukee Common Council, and, in 1878, as Mayor of Milwaukee for a two-year term, a Democrat in a city largely Republican at the time. He appointed a fellow Democrat as police chief, who fired twenty-five Republican policemen (as part of the spoils system then prevalent). He was described by a contemporary, publisher William George Bruce, as "a tall, broad-shouldered, dark-bearded man, a positive character who spoke his mind freely and who called a spade a spade." Black was the Democratic nominee to the United States Congress in 1886, but was defeated by Henry Smith of the Union Labor Party.

He died at his home in Milwaukee on October 25, 1899. He is buried at Calvary Cemetery.

Party political offices
Preceded by Peter Rupp	Democratic nominee for State Treasurer of Wisconsin; 1869	Succeeded by Anton Klaus
Wisconsin State Assembly
Preceded by James Hoye	Member of the Wisconsin State Assembly from the Milwaukee 3rd district January 1, 1872 – January 6, 1873	Succeeded by James McGrath
Wisconsin Senate
Preceded by John L. Mitchell	Member of the Wisconsin Senate from the 6th district January 5, 1874 – January 3, 1876	Succeeded by John L. Mitchell
Political offices
Preceded by Ammi R. Butler	Mayor of Milwaukee, Wisconsin; April 1878 – April 1880	Succeeded by Thomas H. Brown
