= Calamine, Wisconsin =

- Unincorporated community
- Location within Wisconsin Location within the United States
- Coordinates: 42°44′33″N 90°09′43″W
- Country: United States
- State: Wisconsin
- County: Lafayette
- Town: Willow Springs
- Elevation: 889 ft (271 m)
- Time zone: UTC-6 (Central (CST))
  - Summer (DST): UTC-5 (CDT)
- Area code: 608
- GNIS feature ID: 1562506

Calamine is an unincorporated community in the town of Willow Springs in Lafayette County, Wisconsin, United States. The Cheese Country Trail runs through the community, as does the Pecatonica River. The community is home to 100-year-old St. Michael Church, within the Roman Catholic Diocese of Madison. Next to the church is the Willow Springs township hall, which was the former one room school house until 1961, when the new Willow Springs school opened. Many scholars were produced between its walls.

Calamine was once a bustling community with prosperous mines and farms with an active railroad. The railroad was operated by the Milwaukee Road RR and switched at Calamine, either going north to Slateford and Mineral Point or West to Belmont, Ipswich and Platteville. In the 1950s and 1960s, large cattle trains would unload Texas cattle in the spring at Calamine and Slateford to be hauled to Kenyon Cattle Company’s pastures. Stores, hotels, blacksmiths, and taverns thrived. For many years local farmers hauled their milk to the Calamine cheese factory to be made into famous Swiss cheese. Later the Cornland fertilizer plant was built and supplied farmers for miles around with granular and liquid fertilizer, making the nearby Pecatonica River bottoms top producers in non flood years. North of Calamine, there was a popular swimming hole known as the “Mill” on the Pecatonica River, named after a prehistoric gristmill, which was burned to the ground during the Blackhawk war. Fourth Cavalry troopers from Fort Defiance were unable to extinguish it and through the procedure somehow discovered this swimming hole.

== Notable people ==
- Montgomery Morrison Cothren, Wisconsin legislator and jurist, lived in Calamine.
- Danverse Neff, Wisconsin legislator, lived in Calamine.
