= Mortimer M. Jackson =

American judge

The Honorable Mortimer M. Jackson
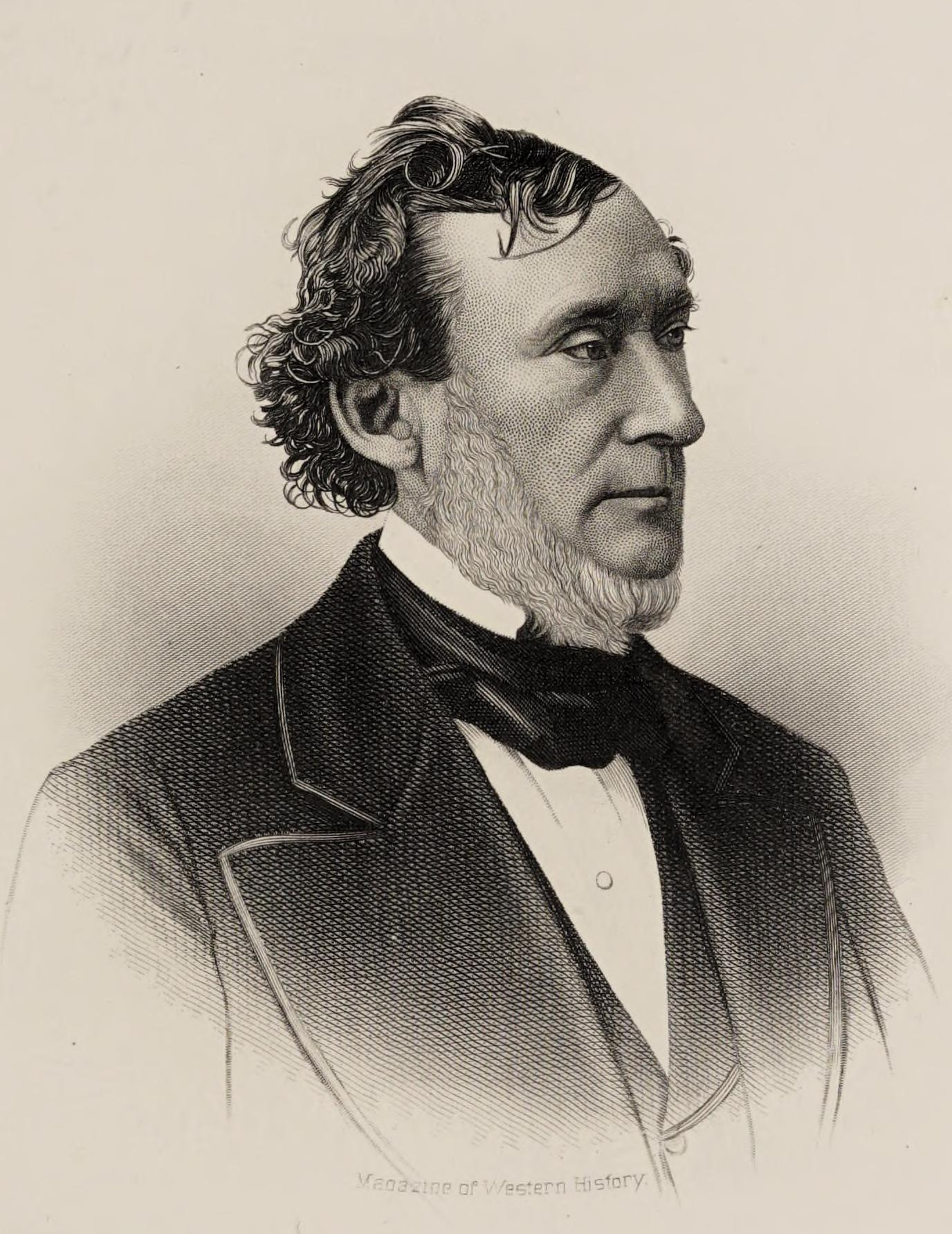

Justice of the Wisconsin Supreme Court
- ex officio
- In office September 1848 – June 1, 1853

Wisconsin Circuit Court Judge for the 5th Circuit
- In office September 1848 – June 1, 1853
- Preceded by: Position Established
- Succeeded by: Montgomery M. Cothren

3rd and 5th Attorney General of the Wisconsin Territory
- In office 1845 – January 22, 1846
- Governor: Henry Dodge
- Preceded by: William Pitt Lynde
- Succeeded by: A. Hyatt Smith
- In office June 26, 1842 – 1844
- Governor: James Duane Doty
- Preceded by: Horatio Wells
- Succeeded by: William Pitt Lynde

Personal details
- Born: Mortimer Melville Jackson; March 5, 1809 Rensselaerville, New York, U.S.
- Died: October 13, 1889 (aged 80) Madison, Wisconsin, U.S.
- Resting place: Forest Hill Cemetery; Madison, Wisconsin
- Party: Republican; Whig (before 1855)
- Spouses: Catharine Garr; (m. 1838; died 1875)
- Occupation: Lawyer, judge

Mortimer Melville Jackson (March 5, 1809 – October 13, 1889) was an American lawyer, judge, and diplomat. He was a justice of the original Wisconsin Supreme Court from 1848 through 1853 and was later a United States consul general in Canada for twenty years. Prior to Wisconsin statehood, he was Attorney General of the Wisconsin Territory.

== Biography ==
Jackson was born in Rensselaerville, New York. He received his education in New York City, where he studied law and was admitted to the bar. In 1838, Jackson moved to Milwaukee, and then in 1839, to Mineral Point, Wisconsin Territory, where he practiced law, involving the lead-mining industry.

In 1842, Wisconsin Territorial Governor James Duane Doty appointed Jackson Attorney General of the Wisconsin Territory, where he served until 1846. When Wisconsin became a state in 1848, Jackson was elected one of the first five Wisconsin Circuit Court judges. At the time, the Wisconsin Supreme Court was constituted of the five circuit court judges; thus, Jackson was also a justice of the Wisconsin Supreme Court until a separate Supreme Court was formed in 1853.

Politically, Judge Jackson was involved with the Whig Party from as early as 1834, and joined the Republican Party when it was formed in the 1850s. After Republicans won a legislative majority in the 10th Wisconsin Legislature—and therefore the ability to elect a United States senator at the start of that term—Republican leaders of western Wisconsin pushed for Jackson to be the party's selection for U.S. Senate. The debate was intense among the Republican caucus as they tried to come to consensus on their nominee; other candidates included Timothy O. Howe, Edward D. Holton, Alexander Randall, Wyman Spooner, and James Rood Doolittle. After several days of voting and debate, the Republican caucus coalesced around Doolittle as their nominee on January 21, formally electing him in a joint session of the Legislature two days later.

Later in 1857, Jackson was chosen by the Republican state convention as their candidate for Attorney General of Wisconsin; his opponent at the general election was Oshkosh lawyer Gabriel Bouck. The Wisconsin electorate was nearly evenly split along partisan lines at the 1857 election, Jackson lost by about 400 votes while Republican gubernatorial candidate Alexander Randall won his race by a mere 118 votes.

In 1861, President Abraham Lincoln appointed Jackson United States consul general in Halifax, Canada. As consul general, he was instrumental in the seizure of about $3,000,000 worth of Confederate property during the American Civil War (about $49,000,000 in inflation-adjusted dollars). He would remain in this role for 21 years until his retirement in 1882. He then returned to Madison, Wisconsin, where he died seven years later at the Park Hotel.

== Legacy ==
Jackson's will donated $20,000 to the Law School at the University of Wisconsin to create the Mortimer M. Jackson Professorship of Law.

== Electoral history ==
=== Wisconsin Attorney General (1857) ===
Wisconsin Attorney General Election, 1857
Party	Candidate	Votes	%	±%
General Election, November 3, 1857
Democratic	Gabriel Bouck	44,764	50.23%	−1.00%
Republican	Mortimer M. Jackson	44,362	49.77%	
Plurality		402	0.45%	-1.99%
Total votes		89,126	100.0%	+22.35%
Democratic hold				

Party political offices
Preceded by Alexander Randall	Republican nominee for Attorney General of Wisconsin; 1857	Succeeded by James Henry Howe
Legal offices
Preceded by Horatio Wells	Attorney General of the Wisconsin Territory; 1842 – 1844	Succeeded by William Pitt Lynde
Preceded by William Pitt Lynde	Attorney General of the Wisconsin Territory; 1845 – 1846	Succeeded by A. Hyatt Smith
New court	Wisconsin Circuit Court Judge for the 5th Circuit; 1848 – 1853	Succeeded by Montgomery M. Cothren
New court	Justice of the Wisconsin Supreme Court; 1848 – 1853	Court abolished
