= A. Scott Sloan =

American politician and judge (1820–1895)

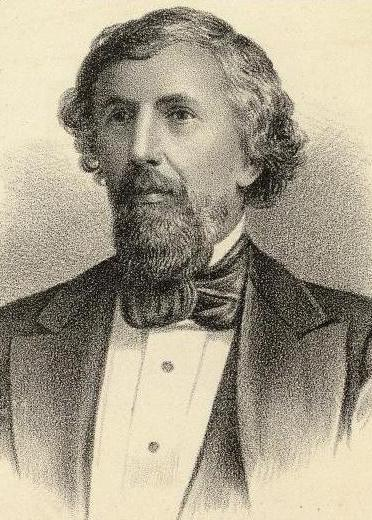

11th Attorney General of Wisconsin
- In office January 5, 1874 – January 7, 1878
- Governor: William Robert Taylor; Harrison Ludington
- Preceded by: Stephen Steele Barlow
- Succeeded by: Alexander Wilson

Member of the U.S. House of Representatives from Wisconsin's 3rd district
- In office March 4, 1861 – March 3, 1863
- Preceded by: Charles H. Larrabee
- Succeeded by: Amasa Cobb

Wisconsin Circuit Court Judge for the 13th circuit
- In office January 2, 1882 – April 8, 1895
- Preceded by: Position established
- Succeeded by: James J. Dick

Wisconsin Circuit Court Judge for the 3rd circuit
- In office September 22, 1858 – June 1, 1859
- Appointed by: Alexander Randall
- Preceded by: Charles H. Larrabee
- Succeeded by: John E. Mann

2nd & 21st Mayor of Beaver Dam, Wisconsin
- In office April 1879 – April 1880
- Preceded by: Edward Elwell
- Succeeded by: George E. Swan
- In office April 1857 – April 1858
- Preceded by: John Robinson
- Succeeded by: E. P. Smith

Member of the Wisconsin State Assembly from the Dodge 5th district
- In office January 5, 1857 – January 4, 1858
- Preceded by: Charles Burchard
- Succeeded by: Frederick H. Kribs

Personal details
- Born: Andrew Scott Sloan; June 12, 1820 Morrisville, New York, U.S.
- Died: April 8, 1895 (aged 74) Beaver Dam, Wisconsin, U.S.
- Resting place: Oakwood Cemetery, Beaver Dam, Wisconsin
- Party: Republican; Lib. Republican (1873–1876)
- Spouse: Ann Dodge
- Children: Henry Clay Sloan^{(b. 1846; died 1915)}; Catherine B. Sloan; Ledyard L. Sloan; five others
- Parents: Andrew Scott Sloan (father); Mehitable (Conkey) Sloan (mother)
- Relatives: Ithamar Sloan (brother)

Andrew Scott Sloan (June 12, 1820 – April 8, 1895) was an American lawyer, politician, and Wisconsin pioneer. He served one term in the U.S. House of Representatives (1861–1863) and served as Wisconsin's 11th Attorney General (1874–1878). For most of his political career, he was a Republican, but while serving as attorney general, he ran as a Liberal Republican, part of the short-lived Reform coalition in Wisconsin.

Later in life, Sloan also served 14 years as a Wisconsin circuit court judge and was a three-term mayor of Beaver Dam, Wisconsin. His name was almost always abbreviated as A. Scott Sloan or A. S. Sloan.

His son, Henry Clay Sloan, and younger brother, Ithamar Sloan, were also prominent politicians and lawyers in Wisconsin during the latter half of the 19th century.

== Biography ==
Born in Morrisville, New York, Sloan attended the public schools and Morrisville Academy. He married Angelina Mary Dodge in 1841 or 1843. He studied law and was admitted to the bar in 1842, commencing practice in Morrisville, New York. He served as clerk of the Madison County Court from 1847 to 1849.

In 1854, Sloan moved to Wisconsin, settling in Beaver Dam, Wisconsin, where he continued the practice of law. He served as member of the Wisconsin State Assembly in 1857, and as mayor of Beaver Dam in 1857, 1858, and again in 1879. In 1858, he was also appointed in 1858 as Wisconsin circuit court judge for Wisconsin's 3rd circuit.

Sloan was elected as a Republican to the Thirty-seventh Congress (March 4, 1861 – March 3, 1863) as the representative of Wisconsin's 3rd congressional district. He was not a candidate for renomination in 1862, and afterwards resumed the practice of law. He was an unsuccessful candidate of the Union Party for election in 1864 to the Thirty-ninth Congress. He then served as clerk of the United States District Court for the District of Wisconsin from 1864 until 1866, and as judge of the Dodge County Court from 1868 to 1874. He was Attorney General of Wisconsin from 1874 to 1878, and served as judge of the circuit court for the thirteenth judicial district from January 1882 until his death.

He died of pneumonia in Beaver Dam at the age of 74, and was interred in Oakwood Cemetery. His son, Henry Clay Sloan, was also a member of the Wisconsin State Assembly.

== Electoral history ==
=== Wisconsin Supreme Court (1860) ===
1860 Wisconsin Supreme Court Chief Justice special election
Party	Candidate	Votes	%	±%
General Election, April 3, 1860
Independent	Luther S. Dixon (incumbent)	58,508	50.13%	
Republican	A. Scott Sloan	58,113	49.79%	
	Scattering	95	0.08%	
Plurality		395	0.34%	
Total votes		116,716	100.0%	
Independent hold				

=== U.S. House of Representatives (1860) ===
Wisconsin's 3rd Congressional District Election, 1860
Party	Candidate	Votes	%	±%
General Election, November 6, 1860
Republican	A. Scott Sloan	34,002	53.98%	+4.93%
Democratic	Charles H. Larrabee (incumbent)	28,986	46.02%	
Plurality		5,016	7.96%	+6.06%
Total votes		62,988	100.0%	+34.26%
Republican gain from Democratic				

=== U.S. House of Representatives (1864) ===
Wisconsin's 4th Congressional District Election, 1864
Party	Candidate	Votes	%	±%
General Election, November 8, 1864
Democratic	Charles A. Eldredge (incumbent)	15,547	58.93%	
Republican	A. Scott Sloan	10,835	41.07%	+2.57%
Plurality		4,712	17.86%	-5.15%
Total votes		26,382	100.0%	+5.76%
Democratic hold				

=== Wisconsin Attorney General (1873, 1875) ===
1873 Wisconsin Attorney General election
Party	Candidate	Votes	%	±%
General Election, November 4, 1873
Reform	A. Scott Sloan	79,594	52.59%	−5.11%
Republican	Leander F. Frisby	67,921	34.59%	−7.71%
Plurality		11,673	7.91%	+1.44%
Total votes		147,515	100.0%	+0.26%
Reform gain from Republican				

1875 Wisconsin Attorney General election
Party	Candidate	Votes	%	±%
General Election, November 2, 1875
Liberal Republican	A. Scott Sloan (incumbent)	85,745	50.53%	
Republican	John R. Bennett	83,934	49.47%	+3.42%
Plurality		1,811	1.07%	-6.85%
Total votes		169,679	100.0%	+15.02%
Liberal Republican gain from Reform				

Party political offices
Party established	Reform nominee for Attorney General of Wisconsin; 1873, 1875	Party abolished
Wisconsin State Assembly
Preceded by Charles Burchard	Member of the Wisconsin State Assembly from the Dodge 5th district January 5, 1857 – January 4, 1858	Succeeded by Frederick H. Kribs
U.S. House of Representatives
Preceded by Charles H. Larrabee	Member of the U.S. House of Representatives from Wisconsin's 3rd congressional district March 4, 1861 – March 3, 1863	Succeeded by Amasa Cobb
Political offices
Preceded by John Robinson	Mayor of Beaver Dam, Wisconsin; April 1857 – April 1859	Succeeded by E. P. Smith
Preceded by Edward Elwell	Mayor of Beaver Dam, Wisconsin; April 1879 – April 1880	Succeeded by George E. Swan
Legal offices
Preceded by Charles H. Larrabee	Wisconsin Circuit Court Judge for the 3rd circuit September 22, 1858 – June 1, 1859	Succeeded by John E. Mann
Preceded by Stephen Steele Barlow	Attorney General of Wisconsin; January 5, 1874 – January 7, 1878	Succeeded by Alexander Wilson
New circuit created	Wisconsin Circuit Court Judge for the 13th circuit January 2, 1882 – April 8, 1895	Succeeded by James J. Dick
