= Ammi R. Butler =

19th century American lawyer and politician

A. R. R. Butler
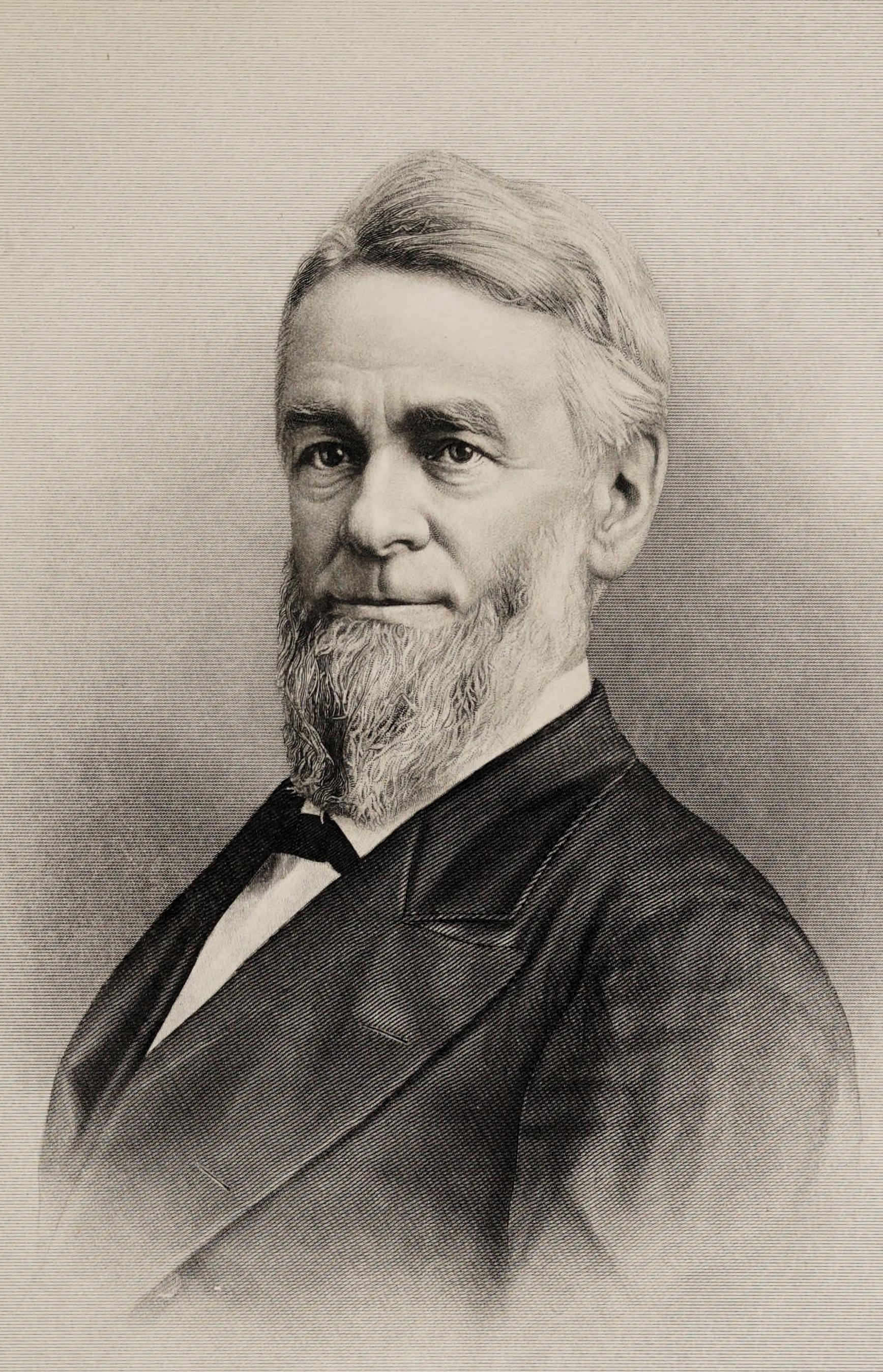

23rd Mayor of Milwaukee
- In office April 1876 – April 1878
- Preceded by: Harrison Ludington
- Succeeded by: John Black

Member of the Wisconsin State Assembly from the Milwaukee 4th district
- In office January 1, 1866 – January 1, 1867
- Preceded by: DeWitt Davis
- Succeeded by: Edwin Hyde

District Attorney of Milwaukee County, Wisconsin
- In office January 1, 1849 – January 1, 1855
- Preceded by: James S. Brown
- Succeeded by: James A. Mallory

Personal details
- Born: September 4, 1821 Vermont, U.S.
- Died: April 4, 1901 (aged 79) Milwaukee, Wisconsin, U.S.
- Resting place: Forest Home Cemetery, Milwaukee
- Party: Democratic
- Spouse: Orvilla Lurana Tanner (died 1895)
- Children: Mary O. Butler^{(b. 1844; died 1849)}; John Ammi Butler^{(b. 1851; died 1922)}
- Profession: lawyer

Ammi Ruhama Robbins Butler Jr. (September 4, 1821 – April 4, 1901) was an American lawyer, Democratic politician, and Wisconsin pioneer. He was the 23rd mayor of Milwaukee, Wisconsin, serving from 1876 to 1878. He also served one term in the Wisconsin State Assembly in 1866. In historical documents, his name is almost always abbreviated as A. R. R. Butler.

== Biography ==
Butler was born in Vermont. The year after his birth, he moved with his parents to Genesee County, New York, where Butler was educated. He completed his training in law at Buffalo, and was admitted to the New York State Bar Association in 1846.

He moved to Milwaukee, Wisconsin, later that year, and entered the legal profession. In 1848, he was elected district attorney for Milwaukee County. He served in that role for the next six years, after which, he returned to private practice.

As district attorney, Butler was the prosecutor at Wisconsin's first moral insanity case. The case occurred when 23 year old seamstress Mary Ann Wheeler used a pistol to shoot John M. W. Lace in the back of the head while he was standing on a public sidewalk looking at a store window display, surrounded by witnesses. Initially, witnesses did not realize that Wheeler had shot him, and instead assumed that Lace's own pistol had gone off and shot himself. Wheeler did not attempt to flee, and instead confessed when police arrived, subsequently revealing that she had bought the gun and a knife to kill Lace, having had a previous grievance with him, that she was happy she had done it, and that she would be content to be executed for it. Her lawyer asserted that Wheeler had been seduced by Lace and became pregnant, but that Lace refused to marry her, and attempted to break off the affair eventually leading Wheeler to seek an abortion. Her attorneys argued that her anguish from these circumstances, as well as a fear about public disclosure, led to a temporary insanity before the shooting. The jury deadlocked after three days of deliberation, a new trial was ordered, and the second jury voted to acquit on grounds of temporary insanity.

He was elected on the Democratic Party ticket, in 1865, to represent Milwaukee County in the Wisconsin State Assembly, but was not a candidate for re-election in 1866. His name was placed on several tickets as a Democratic candidate for Wisconsin Supreme Court in the 1869 election, but he did not seek the office and was not formally nominated.

In 1876, Butler was nominated for mayor of Milwaukee by the Milwaukee Democratic Party, although he had previously declined being a candidate. Delegates chose him for the nomination over Henry M. Benjamin, a prominent businessman. He went on to win the general election without facing serious opponent, and was re-elected in 1877 also without opposition. Butler was also mentioned as a candidate for Governor of Wisconsin in the 1877 election, but he never entered that race.

In 1882, the Milwaukee Democrats attempted to induce him into another race, offering him the nomination for Wisconsin Senate in the 7th Senate district, which then comprised most of downtown Milwaukee. Butler declined the nomination.

Butler retired from the legal profession in the mid-1880s and moved to Oconomowoc, Wisconsin, where he took over a ranch. In his new home in Waukesha County, Butler again became the subject of unsolicited party nomination votes. At the 1886 Democratic congressional convention in the 2nd congressional district, the incumbent Edward S. Bragg, eventually lost the nomination on the 216th ballot to his perennial rival, Arthur Delaney. In earlier rounds of voting, Butler had received a large number of votes from delegates who did not want to pledge to either major candidate, eventually forcing Butler to formally write to the convention that he would decline the nomination.

In the winter of 1888, Butler suffered a major fire at his estate in Oconomowoc, resulting in a loss of property valued between $30,000 and $40,000 (about $1M to $1.3M adjusted for inflation to 2024) as well as a number of items that were irreplaceable, including valuable paintings and his library.

== Personal life and family ==
A. R. R. Butler Jr. was one of six children born to Dr. A. R. R. Butler, a prominent physician, and his wife Matilda (née Stone).

Ammi R. R. Butler married Orvilla Lurana Tanner. They had two children together, though one died in childhood. Orvilla died in 1895 after a short illness. Their one surviving son, John A. Butler, also became an attorney and partnered for some time with his father before his retirement. Later in life, John Butler was prominent in the progressive push for a merit-based civil service in Wisconsin.

A. R. R. Butler died in 1901, at his home in Milwaukee, and was interred at Forest Home Cemetery in Milwaukee.

== Electoral history ==
=== Wisconsin Supreme Court (1869) ===
1869 Wisconsin Supreme Court Chief Justice election
Party	Candidate	Votes	%	±%
General Election, April 6, 1869
Republican	Luther S. Dixon (incumbent)	100,945	93.73%	
Democratic	Ammi R. Butler	6,428	5.97%	
	Scattering	326	0.30%	
Plurality		94,517	87.76%	
Total votes		107,699	100.0%	
Republican hold				

Political offices
Preceded by Harrison Ludington	Mayor of Milwaukee, Wisconsin; 1876 – 1878	Succeeded by John Black
Legal offices
Preceded by James S. Brown as Prosecuting Attorney	District Attorney of Milwaukee County, Wisconsin; 1849 – 1855	Succeeded by James A. Mallory
