= 1860 Wisconsin Supreme Court Chief Justice special election =

- April 3, 1860
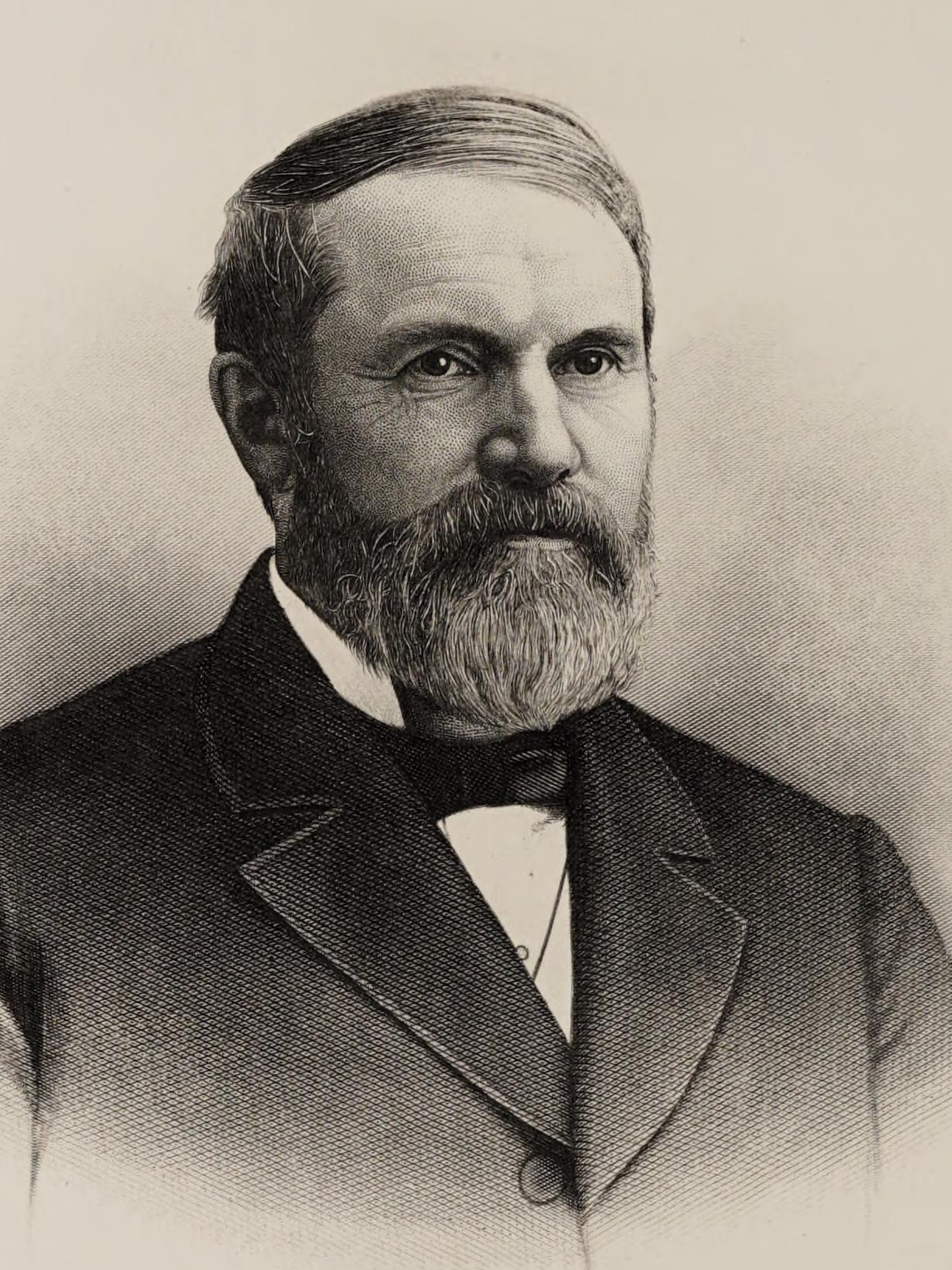

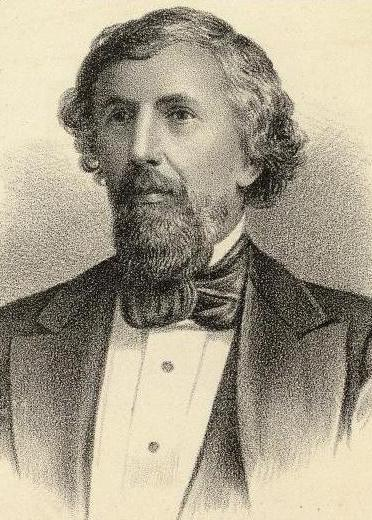
Candidate	Luther S. Dixon	A. Scott Sloan
Party	Independent	Republican
Popular vote	58,508	58,113
Percentage	50.13%	49.79%
- Dixon: 50–60% 60–70% 70–80% 80–90% >90% Sloan: 50–60% 60–70% 70–80% 80–90% Other: No data/No votes
Justice before election
Luther S. Dixon
Elected Justice
Luther S. Dixon

The 1860 Wisconsin Supreme Court Chief Justice special election was a special election held on Tuesday, April 3, 1860, to elect the chief justice of the Wisconsin Supreme Court. Incumbent appointed chief justice Luther S. Dixon very narrowly won election to a partial term.

== Background ==
After the sudden death of Chief Justice Edward V. Whiton, Governor Alexander Randall appointed Luther S. Dixon as chief justice of the court, pending the special election. Dixon ran in the special election for the remainder of Whiton's unexpired term.

== Result ==
1860 Wisconsin Supreme Court Chief Justice special election
Party	Candidate	Votes	%	±%
General Election, April 3, 1860
Independent	Luther S. Dixon (incumbent)	58,508	50.13	
Republican	A. Scott Sloan	58,113	49.79	
	Scattering	95	0.08	
Plurality		395	0.34	
Total votes		116,716	100.0	
Independent hold				
