= 1869 Wisconsin Supreme Court Chief Justice election =

- April 7, 1869
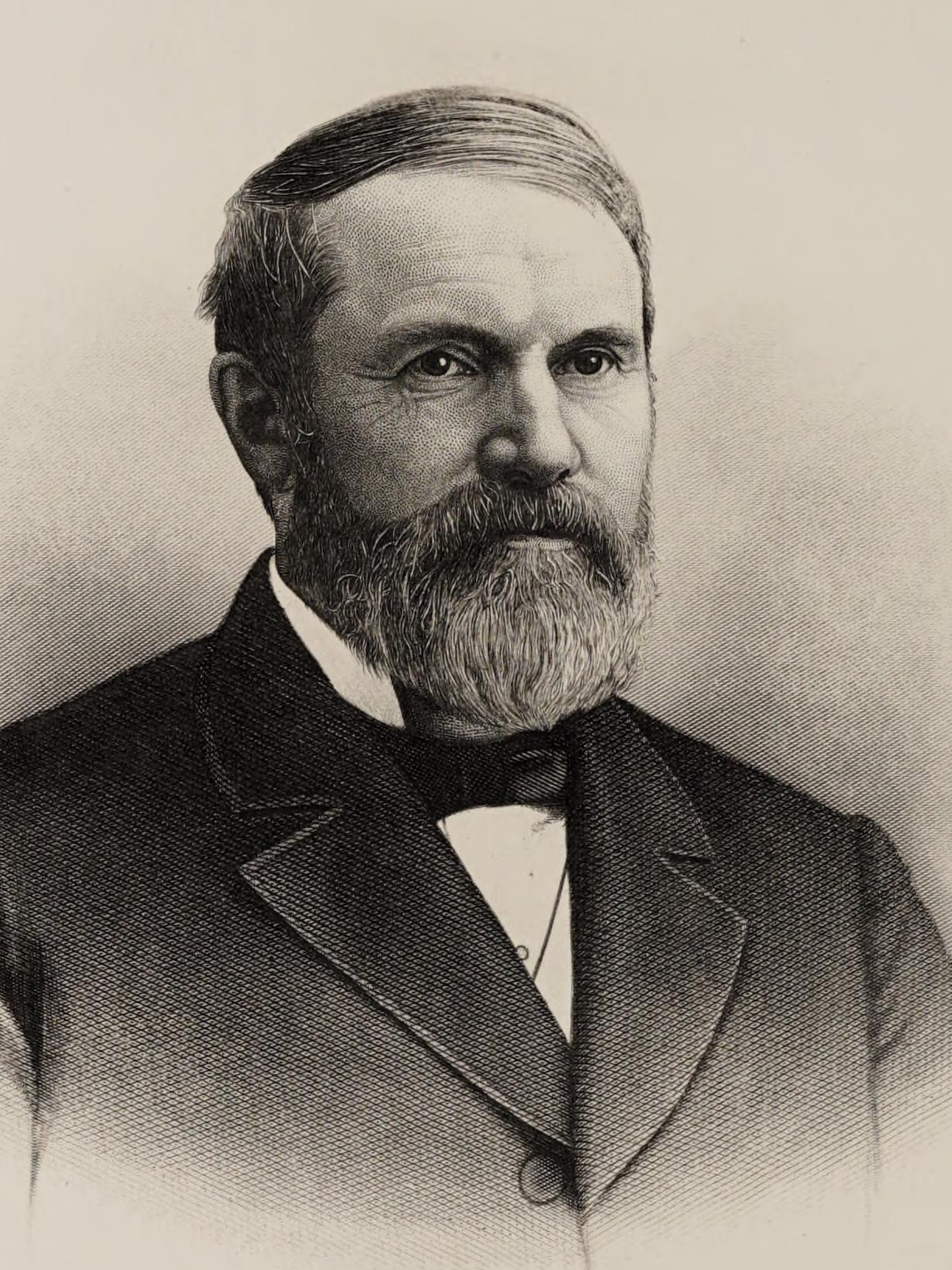

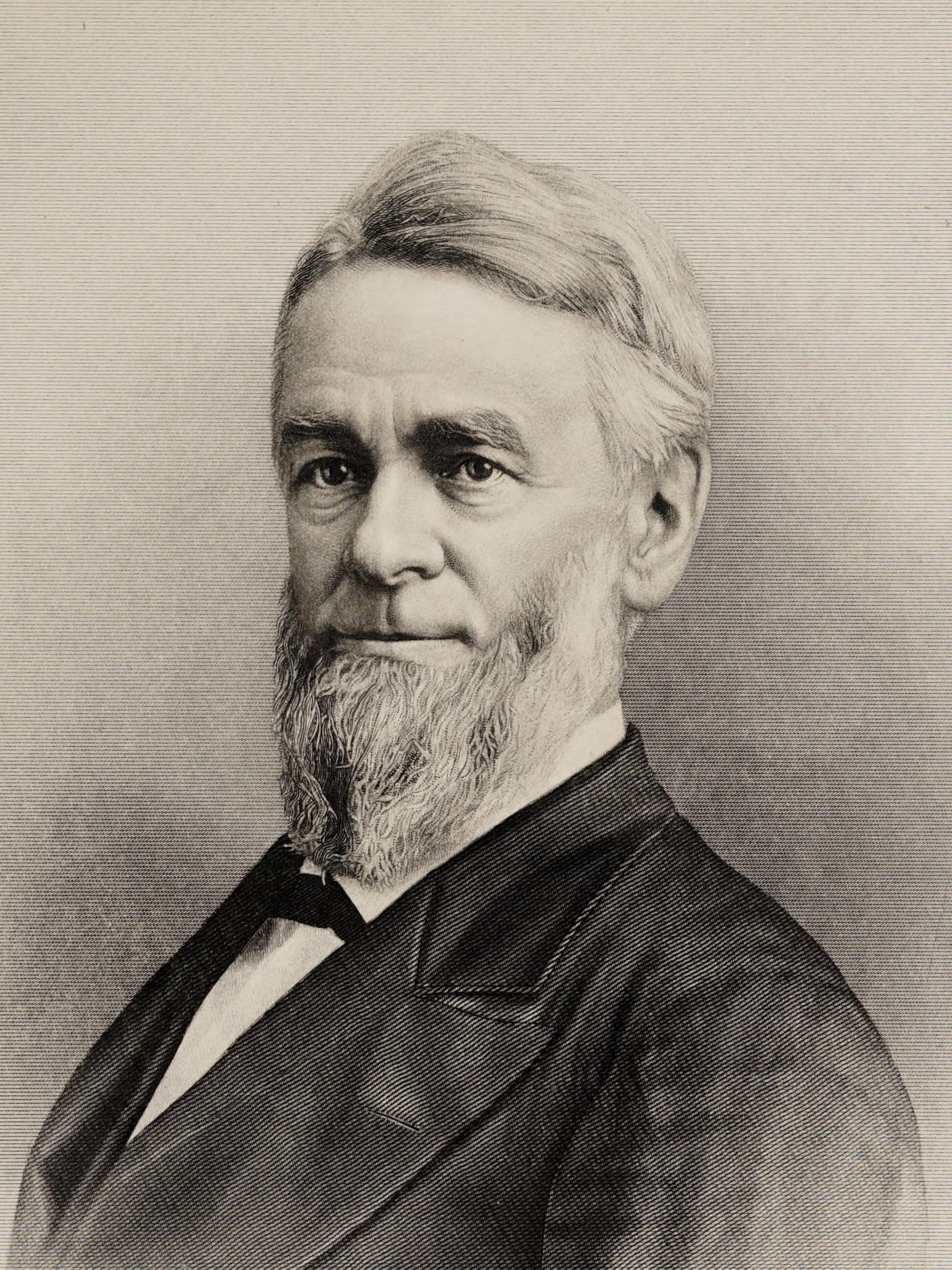
Candidate	Luther S. Dixon	Ammi R. Butler
Party	Republican	Democratic
Popular vote	100,945	6,428
Percentage	93.73%	5.97%
Justice before election
Luther S. Dixon
Republican
Elected Justice
Luther S. Dixon
Republican

The 1869 Wisconsin Supreme Court Chief Justice election was held on Tuesday, April 6, 1869, to elect the chief justice of the Wisconsin Supreme Court for a ten-year term. Incumbent justice Luther S. Dixon was re-elected.

1869 was a regularly scheduled election. Dixon had recently been re-elected the previous year in a special election held because he had briefly vacated his seat (being re-appointed immediately thereafter) in order to receive a salary increase. While he faced a fairly competitive race in 1868, he faced no serious opposition in 1869.

1869 Wisconsin Supreme Court Chief Justice election
Party	Candidate	Votes	%	±%
General election, April 6, 1869
Republican	Luther S. Dixon (incumbent)	100,945	93.73	
Democratic	Ammi R. Butler	6,428	5.97	
	Scattering	326	0.30	
Plurality		94,517	87.76	
Total votes		107,699	100	
Republican hold				
