= Charles Burchard =

American politician

Charles Burchard (January 1, 1810 – April 1, 1879) was an American politician.

Burchard was born in Granby, Massachusetts. He married Martha Pitcher (1810–1901) in 1829. Burchard moved to western New York, where he took part in the United States Liberty Party. In 1844, Burchard supported the presidential campaign of Henry Clay. Then in 1845, he moved to Waukesha (then known as Prairieville), Wisconsin Territory. He then served in the first Wisconsin Constitutional Convention of 1846 as a Whig. Burchard moved to Mayville, Wisconsin in 1854 and then to Beaver Dam, Wisconsin in 1854. He served in the Wisconsin State Assembly in 1856. He also served on the Dodge County, Wisconsin Board of Supervisors. During the American Civil War, he was a member of the enrollment board with the rank of major. He fell ill in February 1879 and died of paralysis in Beaver Dam, Wisconsin in April that year.

He was the father of the politician Samuel D. Burchard.
