= Luther S. Dixon =

19th century American judge, 4th Chief Justice of the Wisconsin Supreme Court

The Honorable Luther S. Dixon
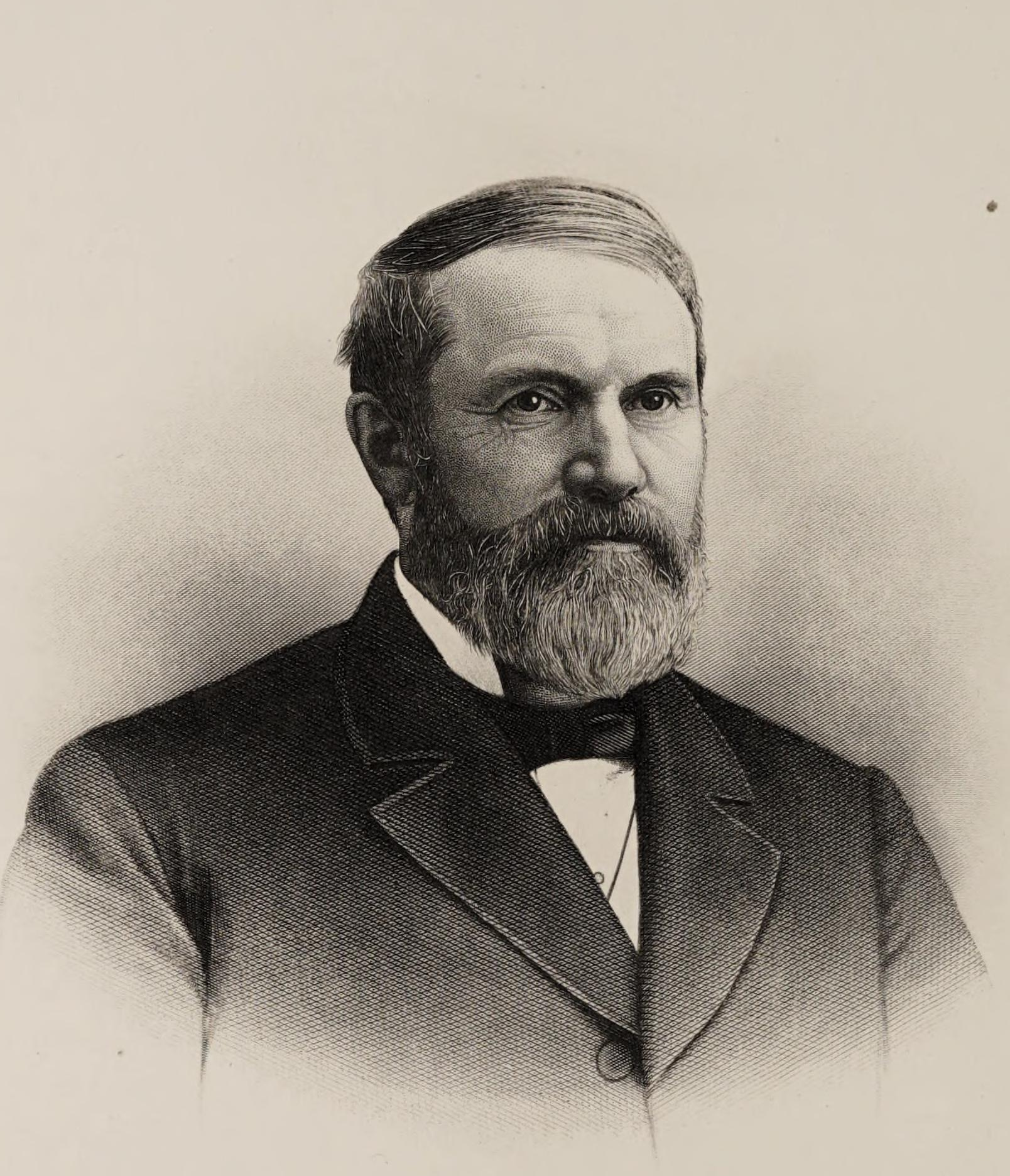

4th Chief Justice of the Wisconsin Supreme Court
- In office April 19, 1859 – June 17, 1874
- Appointed by: Alexander Randall
- Preceded by: Edward V. Whiton
- Succeeded by: Edward George Ryan

Wisconsin Circuit Court Judge for the 9th Circuit
- In office September 5, 1858 – April 19, 1859
- Appointed by: Alexander Randall
- Preceded by: Alexander L. Collins
- Succeeded by: Harlow S. Orton

District Attorney of Columbia County, Wisconsin
- In office January 1, 1853 – December 31, 1856
- Preceded by: Amasa G. Cook
- Succeeded by: Levi W. Barden

Personal details
- Born: June 17, 1825 Milton, Vermont, U.S.
- Died: December 6, 1891 (aged 66) Milwaukee, Wisconsin, U.S.
- Resting place: Forest Hill Cemetery; Madison, Wisconsin
- Party: Republican; Independent (1860); Democratic (before 1855)
- Height: 6 ft 4 in (193 cm)
- Spouse: Mary Eliza Woods (m. 1852–1891)
- Children: Henry Woods Dixon^{(b. 1853; died 1888)}; Luther Swift Dixon^{(b. 1860; died 1860)}; William A. Dixon^{(b. 1862; died 1909)}; Edward L. Dixon^{(b. 1864; died 1904)}; Daisy Dixon^{(b. 1866; died 1906)}
- Parents: Luther Dixon (father); Sarah (Pearl) (Seeger) Dixon (mother)
- Education: Norwich University
- Profession: Lawyer, judge

Luther Swift Dixon (June 17, 1825 – December 6, 1891) was an American lawyer, jurist, and Wisconsin pioneer. He was the 4th chief justice of the Wisconsin Supreme Court, serving from 1859 to 1874. He previously served as a Wisconsin circuit court judge and district attorney in Columbia County, Wisconsin.

== Early life and career ==
Luther S. Dixon was born in Milton, Vermont, and raised on his father's farm. He attended common schools and academies in the region, and began studying law in Milton in 1842, under attorney Albert G. Whittemore. He entered Norwich University in 1845, and studied there for two years, but did not complete his education. His education was interrupted by the outbreak of the Mexican–American War, when the Norwich president Truman B. Ransom volunteered for service in the war and many of the students attempted to join him. Dixon went to New York to enlist, but was persuaded by his brother to return home.

He instead resumed his legal studies under Luke P. Poland, who became a judge on the Supreme Court of Vermont, and who later represented Vermont as a United States senator and congressman. Dixon was admitted to the bar in 1850.

Later that year, Dixon traveled west to Wisconsin and settled in Portage, in Columbia County, where he started a legal practice. At the fall 1852 election, he was elected district attorney of Columbia County, running on the Democratic Party ticket. He was re-elected for another two-year term in 1854.

=== State of Wisconsin vs. John B. DuBay ===
In the year after his term as district attorney expired, Dixon earned wide recognition for his prosecution of John Baptiste DuBay in his murder trial. DuBay had been involved in a property dispute with William Reynolds, and killed him after a confrontation. DuBay was a prominent character in the Wisconsin Territory and the early years of statehood. He was a celebrated pioneer character, connected to the American Fur Company, which was one of the most powerful businesses in the Wisconsin Territory. He was part French Canadian, part Menominee Indian, and served as an interpreter for many important negotiations with Wisconsin's Native American communities.

DuBay's attorneys were both esteemed lawyers and prominent politicians—Moses M. Strong had been Speaker of the Wisconsin Assembly, and had famously secured the acquittal of James Russell Vineyard after he had killed a fellow representative on the floor of the territorial legislature; Harlow S. Orton had been an attorney for Governor Coles Bashford when he successfully challenged the results of the 1855 Wisconsin gubernatorial election. The judge in the case, Wisconsin Circuit Court Judge Alexander L. Collins, gave wide deference to the defense to bring in a number of prominent Wisconsin pioneers and statesmen to testify to the character of the defendant.

DuBay was ultimately acquitted, but Dixon's reputation was secure. Within a year, he would take the place of the judge who had presided over the case, and within two years he would be Chief Justice of the Wisconsin Supreme Court. Dixon later summarized that the real defendant in the trial was the "pioneer spirit," and that DuBay's crimes went unpunished due to a parade of prominent Wisconsin pioneer character witnesses, which muddied the facts of the crime.

== Wisconsin judiciary ==
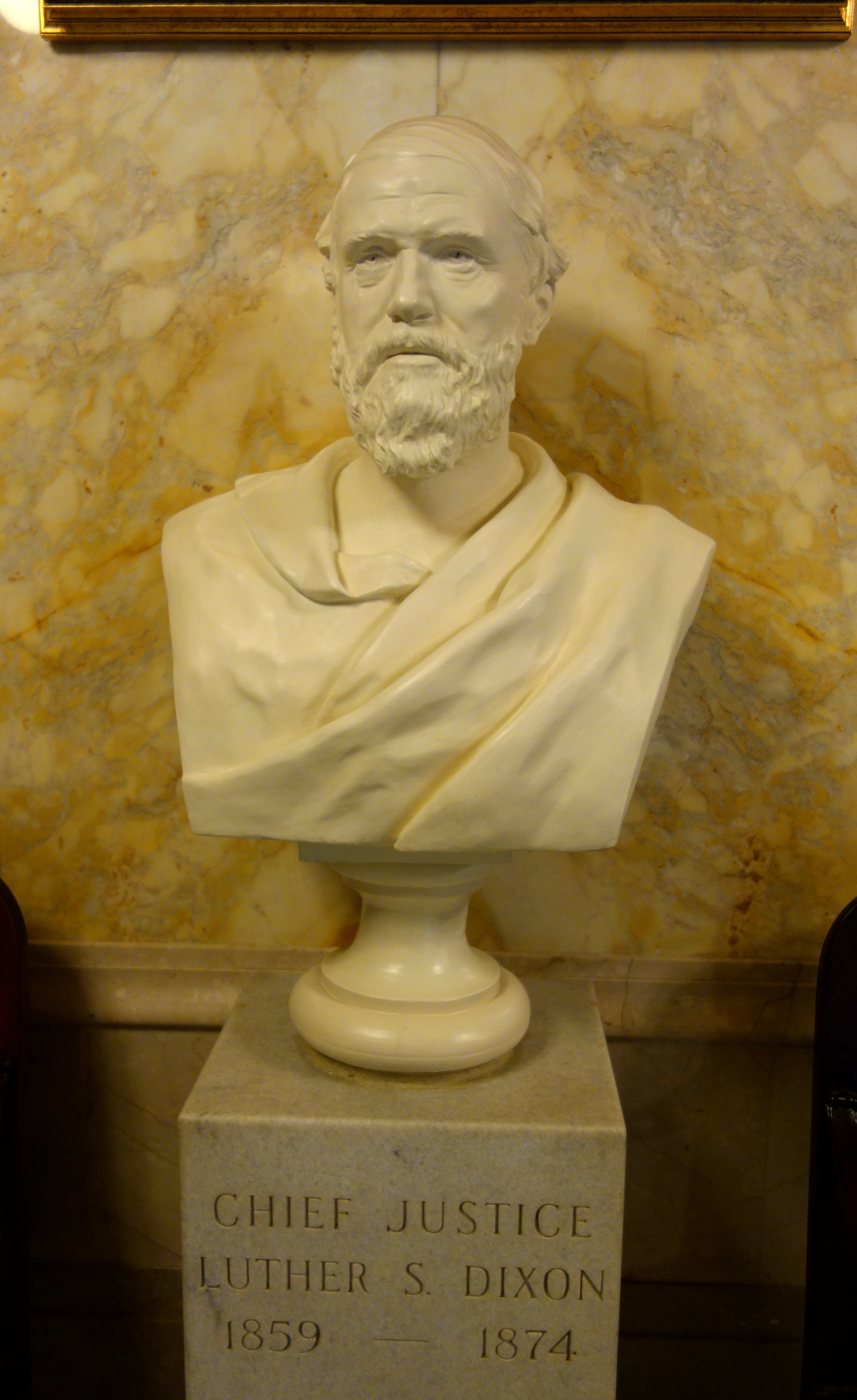
Bust of Justice Dixon at the Wisconsin State Capitol in Madison

Politically, Dixon was an anti-slavery Democrat, and shortly after its founding, he became a member of the Republican Party. In 1858, Judge Alexander Collins resigned his seat in Wisconsin's 9th judicial circuit. The new governor, Alexander Randall, appointed Dixon to the seat, which had jurisdiction over Columbia, Dane, Jefferson, and Sauk counties.

Less than a year later, in April 1859, Chief Justice Edward V. Whiton, of the Wisconsin Supreme Court, died suddenly. Governor Randall again turned to Dixon, naming him Chief Justice of the Wisconsin Supreme Court at the age of 33.

Only months after his appointment as Chief Justice, Dixon ran into controversy when he dissented from the majority of the court which had voted to ignore the ruling of the United States Supreme Court in the case of Ableman v. Booth. The Wisconsin Supreme Court had previously ruled that the federal Fugitive Slave Act of 1850 was unconstitutional, a position which was popular with the ascendant abolitionist Republican party in Wisconsin. The Supreme Court overruled the Wisconsin Court, ruling that state courts could not annul federal laws. Dixon wrote in favor of accepting the decision of the U.S. Supreme Court, stating that while he personally believed the Fugitive Slave Act was unconstitutional, he agreed with the federal court's interpretation of their jurisdiction.

His dissent resulted in him losing the support of the Republican Party for the election in the Spring of 1860, when he was scheduled to run for a full term on the court. Dixon opted to run as an independent. Republicans instead supported A. Scott Sloan, who ran on an extreme state's rights platform against the federal slavery laws. The issue of state's rights thus loomed large over the entire election, animated by a celebrated debate at the state Republican convention, between justice Abram D. Smith, speaking out for his majority opinion against recognizing the authority of the U.S. Supreme Court, and former justice Timothy O. Howe, speaking in defense of Dixon's position that the state court must recognize the appellate authority of the federal court. Dixon ultimately prevailed in the election by a mere 395 votes out of 116,716 cast.

While serving on the court, Dixon was active in the Wisconsin militia as captain of the Madison militia company, the "Hickory Guards". At the outbreak of the American Civil War, Dixon attempted to enter the military service but was dissuaded by Governor Randall, who said he could do more for the country from his position as chief justice than he could on a battlefield. Nevertheless, Dixon did work to recruit and drill troops to prepare them for service in the Union Army. During the presidency of Abraham Lincoln, Dixon was also suggested as a potential candidate for the United States Supreme Court, but he was not nominated. He also faced another difficult election during the war, as Montgomery Morrison Cothren was nominated by the Democratic Party in 1863 on an anti-war platform. Cothren actually won the majority of votes cast by voters in Wisconsin, but Dixon's seat was saved by the absentee votes of Wisconsin's Union Army soldiers in the field.

The salary for a Wisconsin Supreme Court justice was quite small in that era, at just $2,500 (about $50,000 adjusted for inflation to 2023 dollars). In 1867, the legislature voted to increase the salary to $3,500 (about $70,000, adjusted). However, the Constitution of Wisconsin prohibited Dixon from receiving the new salary until he started a new term, so he resigned in March 1867 and was immediately re-appointed by the governor. This led to his second contested election, as the re-appointment meant he was required to stand for election again in 1868. That year, the Democrats nominated Charles Dunn, who had served as chief justice of the supreme court under the Wisconsin Territory government. This time, Dixon had unified support of the Republican Party and he prevailed in the election with 52% of the vote. Dixon had to run for re-election again in 1869 when his regularly scheduled election was up, but faced no serious opposition that year.

Dixon continued to struggle, however, with the low pay of the state court, and resigned from the court in 1874 to return to private legal practice. From 1868 to 1874, Dixon had also served as a lecturer and professor of law at the University of Wisconsin.

== Later years ==
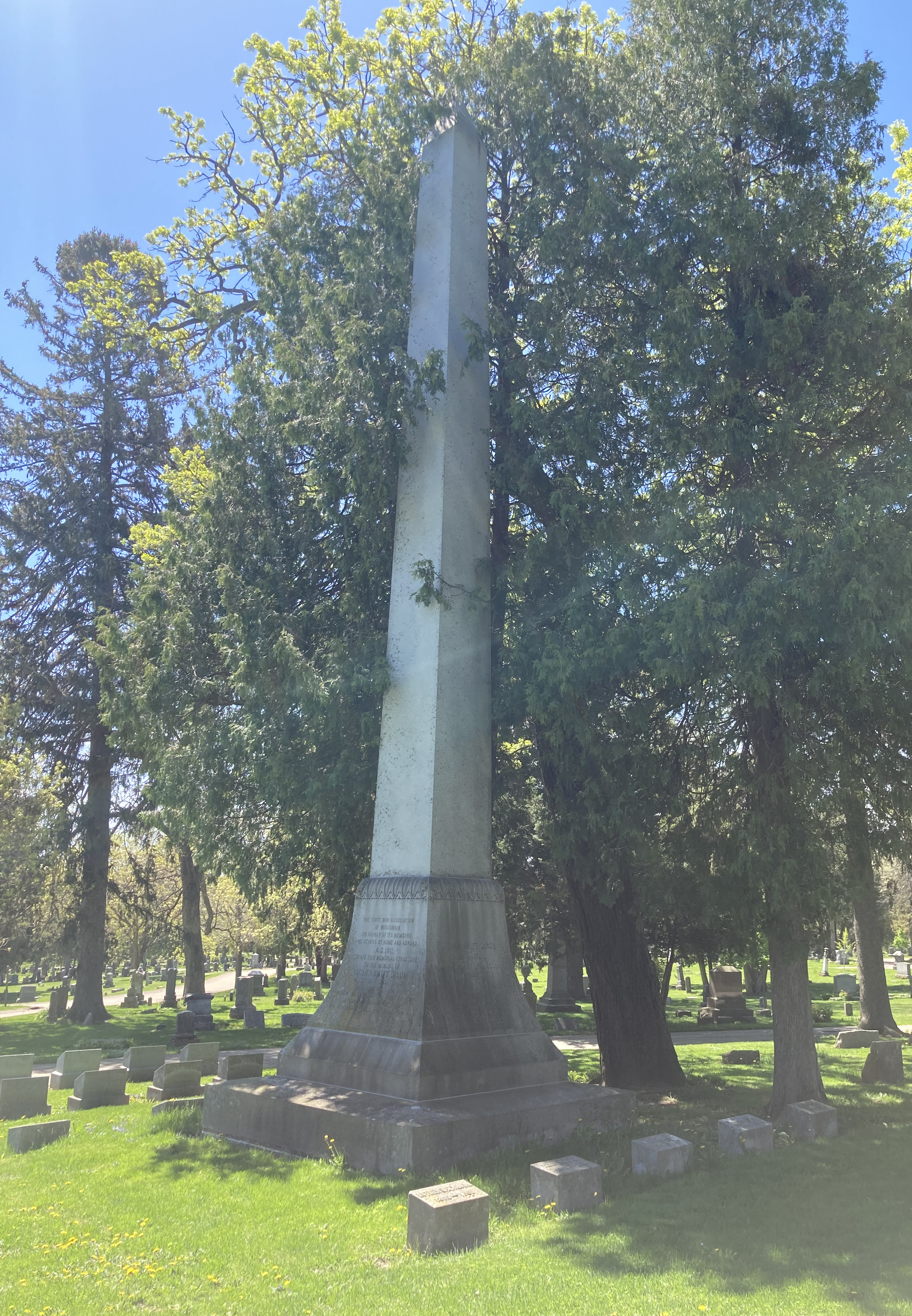
Dixon's grave at Forest Hill Cemetery

He moved to Milwaukee, where he formed a partnership known as Dixon, Hooker, Wegg, & Noyes, which became one of the strongest law firms in the state in that era. He immediately distinguished himself in this new phase of his career, representing the State of Wisconsin in federal court to defend the constitutionality of the state's railroad regulation "Granger" laws. He ultimately argued the case, known as Peik v. Chicago & Northwestern Railway Co., before the United States Supreme Court. Spectators were unimpressed with his remarks at the Supreme Court, but accounts of the deliberations suggested the justices were thoroughly convinced by his presentation, with justice David Davis quoted as remarking "Dixon has told us the law of this case."

In 1875, as the United States Senate election in the Wisconsin Legislature was deadlocked over Republican opposition to their incumbent, Matthew H. Carpenter, Dixon was approached as a potential compromise candidate. But he declined, saying that he could not afford it.

A short time later, he represented the Santa Fe Railroad Company in significant litigation in Colorado, and so he began spending a great deal of time in that state. Dixon had suffered from asthma for his entire life; in Colorado, he came to believe the climate was beneficial to his health, thus he relocated to Denver, Colorado, in 1881. He concentrated his business in Colorado for the remainder of his career, but also maintained his home in Milwaukee.

In 1891, he attended sessions of the United States Supreme Court, in Washington, D.C. He returned from Washington to Milwaukee, exhausted, and died at his home there on December 6, 1891. He was buried at Forest Hill Cemetery in Madison.

== Family and personal life ==
Luther Dixon was a son of Colonel Luther Dixon with his second wife, Sarah Seegar (née Pearl).

Luther Swift Dixon married Mary Eliza Woods, of Colchester, Vermont, in November 1852. They had five children together, though one died in infancy and all of the children died relatively young. Their eldest son, Henry Woods Dixon, became a lawyer but died of a sudden heart attack at age 33 while sitting in a restaurant in 1888. Edward Luther Dixon also became an attorney and partnered with his father in his Colorado law firm, but died of a brain ailment in 1904 at the relatively young age of 39. Their only daughter, Daisy, died of a stroke at age 40 in 1906. Their last son, William A. Dixon, suffered from depression and committed suicide in 1909.

== Electoral history ==
=== Wisconsin Supreme Court (1860, 1863, 1868, 1869) ===
1860 Wisconsin Supreme Court Chief Justice election
Party	Candidate	Votes	%	±%
General Election, April 3, 1860
Independent	Luther S. Dixon (incumbent)	58,508	50.13%	
Republican	A. Scott Sloan	58,113	49.79%	
	Scattering	95	0.08%	
Plurality		395	0.34%	
Total votes		116,716	100.0%	
Independent hold				

1863 Wisconsin Supreme Court Chief Justice election
Party	Candidate	Votes	%	±%
General Election, April 7, 1863
Republican	Luther S. Dixon (incumbent)	61,388	50.98%	
Democratic	Montgomery Morrison Cothren	58,587	48.65%	
	Scattering	442	0.37%	
Plurality		2,801	2.33%	
Total votes		120,417	100.0%	
Republican hold				

1868 Wisconsin Supreme Court Chief Justice special election
Party	Candidate	Votes	%	±%
General Election, April 7, 1868
Republican	Luther S. Dixon (incumbent)	72,470	52.40%	
Democratic	Charles Dunn	65,683	47.49%	
	Scattering	145	0.10%	
Plurality		6,787	4.91%	
Total votes		138,298	100.0%	
Republican hold				

1869 Wisconsin Supreme Court Chief Justice election
Party	Candidate	Votes	%	±%
General Election, April 6, 1869
Republican	Luther S. Dixon (incumbent)	100,945	93.73%	
Democratic	Ammi R. Butler	6,428	5.97%	
	Scattering	326	0.30%	
Plurality		94,517	87.76%	
Total votes		107,699	100.0%	
Republican hold				

Legal offices
Preceded by Amasa G. Cook	District Attorney of Columbia County, Wisconsin; January 1, 1853 – December 31, 1856	Succeeded by Levi W. Barden
Preceded by Alexander L. Collins	Wisconsin Circuit Court Judge for the 9th Circuit; September 5, 1858 – April 19, 1859	Succeeded by Harlow S. Orton
Preceded by Edward V. Whiton	Chief Justice of the Wisconsin Supreme Court; April 19, 1859 – June 17, 1874	Succeeded by Edward George Ryan
