= Lavinia Goodell =

American lawyer (1839–1880)

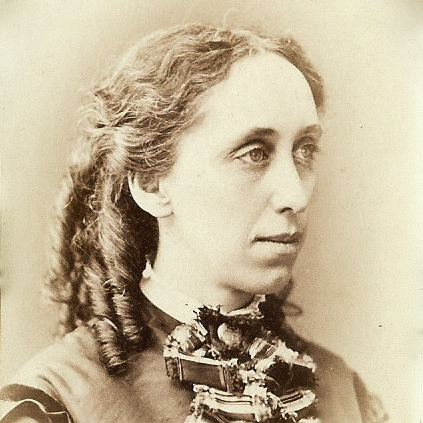
- Lavinia Goodell, c. 1870
- Born: May 2, 1839; Utica, New York
- Died: March 31, 1880 (aged 40); Milwaukee, Wisconsin
- Occupation: Lawyer

Rhoda Lavinia Goodell (May 2, 1839 – March 31, 1880) was the first woman licensed to practice law in Wisconsin and the first woman admitted to the Supreme Court of Wisconsin. In 1880, she also became the first to litigate (and win) an appeal to the Supreme Court of Wisconsin. She was a strong proponent of women's suffrage, abolition, temperance, and prison reform. She was also the first woman to run for city attorney.

== Early life ==
Goodell was born in Utica, New York, to Clarissa and William Goodell. Her father was a prominent abolitionist and she shared his strong beliefs in abolition. In 1858, she wrote a letter to her sister Maria just before graduating from Brooklyn Heights Seminary where she expressed her desire to study law:

I think the study of law would be pleasant, but the practice attended with many embarrassments. Indeed I fear it would be utterly unpracticable [sic]

She stayed in New York during the Civil War and worked at her father's newspaper, The Principia, even filling in as editor-in-chief while her father was ill. She also worked at Harper's Bazaar as an assistant in the editorial room. However when her parents moved to Janesville, Wisconsin, she followed them in 1871.

She began to study law on her own the following year, directed by local attorney A. A. Jackson. She also regularly attended the local circuit court but was unsuccessful in convincing any attorney to take her on as an apprentice.

== Career ==
In 1874, she convinced a local attorney and civic leader Pliny Norcross to sponsor her application for the Rock County, Wisconsin, bar. However, he informed her that Judge Harmon Conger intended to reject her application unless she could find precedent. Goodell wrote to Lucy Stone and other female lawyers across the country to find previous judges who had allowed women to be admitted to the bar. Ultimately the judge could not bar her application and she wrote to her cousin on June 18 that she was a member of the Wisconsin bar.

In 1879, she was present when another female lawyer, Angie King, was examined for admission to the bar. On January 28, 1879, they formed a partnership which is believed to have been the third female legal partnership in the United States.

=== Wisconsin Supreme Court ===
Her first significant case was representing temperance women who wanted to sue two men for the illegal sale of liquor. This case – along with an estate administration case – were appealed to the Wisconsin Supreme Court in 1875. In order for Goodell to appear before the court, she needed to be admitted to the Supreme Court. She petitioned to be admitted in the summer of 1875 and she went to Madison on December 14 to argue before Chief Justice Edward G. Ryan. Ithamar Sloan represented her. On February 16, 1876, her petition was denied.

In May, she wrote a reply to the ruling which denied her admission and submitted it to Wisconsin newspapers, Myra Bradwell's Chicago Legal News, and the Woman's Journal. Then, on March 22, 1877, the Wisconsin legislature enacted a law which prohibited courts from denying admission to the bar on the basis of sex. The bill had been drafted by Goodell and she worked with Speaker of the Wisconsin State Assembly John B. Cassoday for it to pass.

Goodell was admitted to practice before the Wisconsin Supreme Court on June 18, 1879. In 1880, Goodell argued and won her first case, Ingalls v. State, shortly before her death.

== Political Beliefs ==
=== Abolition ===
Goodell's father was a well-known abolitionist and she began writing for his paper, The Principia, in late 1859.

=== Women's Rights ===
Goodell was an active member of the women's rights movement and published many articles on these issues. In 1871, she wrote a series of four articles for the Woman's Journal on suffrage and later wrote a series of articles rebutting the position of the Christian Union that women should be subservient to their husbands.

She drafted a bill for the Wisconsin legislature which would have granted married women whose husbands were unable to support them the right to petition the court to take possession of his property. She convinced John B. Cassoday to introduce the bill but it was never passed.

She corresponded with Elizabeth Cady Stanton and Susan B. Anthony through her life and helped to circulate petitions for a constitutional amendment that would give women the right to vote. In 1878, Goodell signed the Susan B. Anthony amendment, which would become the nineteenth amendment in 1920.

=== Prison Reform ===
In November 1875, she was appointed to defend two criminal defendants and afterwards, she began to regularly visit the Janesville (Rock County) jail. She considered the prisoners to be her "boys" and allowed them to call her "mother". She began a prison literacy program and wrote to her sister on New Years Day:

I believe I could run that jail so as to turn out every man better than he came in. Jails and prisons could just as well be made schools of virtue as vice if people chose to have it so, and would give a very little thought to the subject.

She wrote articles for the Christian Union about prison reform where she advocated for prisoners to be given schooling and voluntary religious education and spoke about it at the 1879 American Women's Association Congress.

=== Temperance ===
She was an active public speaker about temperance. In 1875, she wrote a petition for the state legislature in favor of a prohibitory law. She attended a national temperance meeting in Chicago where she argued that temperance women should support women's suffrage because it would allow them to vote on the issue of temperance. This resolution was backed by Anna Dickinson and was passed.

== Legacy ==
Goodell died on March 31, 1880, from ovarian cancer in Milwaukee, Wisconsin.

Betty Diamond, a playwright and professor at University of Wisconsin-Whitewater, wrote a 2013 play titled Lavinia about Goodell. Wisconsin Chief Justice Shirley Abrahamson, the State Court's Office, and several notable professors of women's studies brought Goodell's story to the Wisconsin Humanities Council for grant funding in 2012. The WHC first funded Diamond's research and writing of the play, and then with a second grant in 2014 funded the performance of the play throughout Wisconsin.

In 2019 the WHC awarded another major grant to help fund the development of a digital biography of Lavinia Goodell. In November 2019 the State Bar of Wisconsin awarded Lavinia a posthumous lifetime legal innovator award for opening the Wisconsin bar to women.
