= Edwin Montgomery =

19th century American politician

Member of the Wisconsin State Assembly from the Waushara County district
- In office January 2, 1871 – January 1, 1872
- Preceded by: Theophilus F. Metcalf
- Succeeded by: Hobart Sterling Sacket

Member of the Wisconsin Senate from the 23rd district
- In office January 7, 1861 – January 5, 1863
- Preceded by: Enias D. Masters
- Succeeded by: Joseph Dorr Clapp

Member of the Iowa House of Representatives from the 32nd district
- In office December 6, 1852 – December 3, 1854 Serving with John Garber
- Preceded by: District established
- Succeeded by: Stephen Prentice Yeomans

Personal details
- Born: May 27, 1817 Harpersfield Township, Ashtabula County, Ohio, U.S.
- Died: March 30, 1881 (aged 63)
- Resting place: Hancock Cemetery, Hancock, Wisconsin
- Party: Republican; Whig (before (1854)
- Spouse: Elizabeth Brown (m. 1855)
- Children: Arthur, Cora, Nellie

Edwin Montgomery (May 27, 1817 – March 30, 1881) was an American farmer, Republican politician, and pioneer of Wisconsin and Iowa. He was a member of the Wisconsin Senate, representing Jefferson County in the 1861 and 1862 legislative sessions. Earlier, he served two years in the Iowa House of Representatives, representing Iowa's 32nd House of Representatives district, and later in life served one term in the Wisconsin State Assembly, representing Waushara County.

== Biography ==
Edwin Montgomery was born in May 1817 in Harpersfield Township, Ashtabula County, Ohio. He received a common school education and came to Wisconsin in 1848, settling originally in the town of Farmington, Jefferson County, Wisconsin. He moved to Fayette County, Iowa, in 1851 and served two years in the Iowa House of Representatives as a Whig from District 32.

He returned to Wisconsin in 1855, returning to Farmington, Jefferson County. In Farmington, he was elected to the Wisconsin Senate in 1860, running on the Republican Party ticket. He did not face an opponent in the general election. He represented the 23rd Senate district, which then comprised most of Jefferson County, in the 1861 and 1862 legislative sessions.

In the spring of 1865, he moved to the village of Hancock, in Waushara County, Wisconsin, where he operated a hotel known as Hancock House. Later he moved to a nearby farm. In 1870, he was the Republican nominee for Wisconsin State Assembly in the Waushara County district, and defeated the Republican incumbent Theophilus F. Metcalf, who ran on the "people's ticket".

== Personal life and family ==
Edwin Montgomery married Elizabeth Brown of Monroe County, Ohio, on December 22, 1855. They had at least three children.

== Electoral history ==
=== Wisconsin Assembly (1870) ===
Wisconsin Assembly, Waushara District Election, 1870
Party	Candidate	Votes	%	±%
General Election, November 8, 1870
Republican	Edwin Montgomery	923	51.39%	+21.63%
Independent Republican	Theophilus F. Metcalf (incumbent)	873	48.61%	
Plurality		50	2.78%	-37.69%
Total votes		1,796	100.0%	+32.64%
Republican gain from Independent Republican				

Iowa House of Representatives
New district	Member of the Iowa House of Representatives from the 32nd district December 6, 1852 – December 3, 1854; Served alongside: John Garber	Succeeded by Stephen Prentice Yeomans
Wisconsin State Assembly
Preceded by Theophilus F. Metcalf	Member of the Wisconsin State Assembly from the Waushara County district January 2, 1871 – January 1, 1872	Succeeded by Hobart Sterling Sacket
Wisconsin Senate
Preceded by Enias D. Masters	Member of the Wisconsin Senate from the 23rd district January 7, 1861 – January 5, 1863	Succeeded by Joseph Dorr Clapp
