= Enias D. Masters =

19th century American politician

Member of the Wisconsin Senate from the 23rd district
- In office January 3, 1859 – January 7, 1861
- Preceded by: Samuel C. Bean
- Succeeded by: Edwin Montgomery

Sergeant-at-Arms of the Wisconsin Senate
- In office January 1851 – January 1852
- Preceded by: James Hanrahan
- Succeeded by: Patrick Cosgrove

Sheriff of Jefferson County, Wisconsin
- In office January 1, 1849 – January 1, 1851
- Preceded by: Royal Tyler
- Succeeded by: James Manville

Personal details
- Born: December 8, 1815 New York, U.S.
- Died: August 5, 1875 (aged 59) Jefferson, Wisconsin, U.S.
- Resting place: Rock River Cemetery, Jefferson, Wisconsin
- Party: Republican; Democratic (before 1854)
- Spouses: Leah Tamson (m. 1844; died 1873); Harriet J. Bennett (m. 1875–1875)
- Children: Lucius Isaac Masters^{(b. 1845; died 1884)}; Charlie Masters^{(b. 1850; died 1852)}; Annie Field Masters^{(b. 1852; died 1877)}; Eugene Dewitt Masters^{(b. 1853; died 1939)}
- Parent: Robert Masters (father)
- Occupation: Sailor, farmer

Enias D. Masters (December 8, 1815 – August 5, 1875) was an American sailor, farmer, Republican politician, and Wisconsin pioneer. He was a member of the Wisconsin Senate, representing southern Jefferson County during the 1859 and 1860 sessions. He previously served as sergeant-at-arms of the Wisconsin Senate during the 1851 session, and he was the sheriff of Jefferson County in 1849 and 1850. His name was often abbreviated E. D. Masters. His first name was sometimes spelled "Enieas" or "Ennias".

== Biography ==
Enias D. Masters was born in New York in December 1815. (Note: Some places note his place of birth as "Lake Ontario" or "Ontario Lake", which could maybe suggest he was born at sea, but there's not enough information.) He followed his father to the Wisconsin Territory, where his father was one of the first settlers of what is now Jefferson County, Wisconsin.

Masters quickly became active in local politics, originally as a member of the Democratic Party. In 1848, he was elected sheriff of Jefferson County. Following his two-year term as sheriff, he was chosen by the Wisconsin Senate as sergeant-at-arms for the 1851 session. After that, he was one of the founders of the Jefferson County Agricultural Society and the Jefferson Poor House. He would remain active with both organizations, later serving as superintendent of the poor house, and serving in several offices in the agricultural society.

Masters joined the new Republican Party after its creation in 1854. He made his first run for state office in 1855. He received the Republican Party nomination for Wisconsin State Assembly in Jefferson County's 3rd Assembly district, which then comprised roughly the southwest quadrant of the county. He was defeated in the general election by Democrat David L. Morrison.

He was subsequently nominated for Wisconsin Senate in 1858 in the 23rd Senate district, which then comprised about 75% of the territory of Jefferson County. He defeated Democrat Milo Jones in the general election and served in the 1859 and 1860 legislative sessions.

During the war, he was appointed as an inspector of forage at Baltimore.

After the war, he was appointed to a special legislative commission to deal with the debt of the town of Jefferson. He was also active in the founding and construction of the Jefferson Liberal Institute. The school failed, however, in the Panic of 1873, but the building was later utilized by the Jefferson school district.

He died at his home in Jefferson on August 5, 1875, after an illness of several weeks.

== Personal life and family ==
Enias D. Masters was the second of twelve children born to Captain Robert Masters and his first wife, Olive. Robert Masters was a sailor and recognized as one of the founders of the city of Jefferson, Wisconsin. He was the first register of deeds of Jefferson County, and represented Jefferson County in the lower house during the first two sessions of the 4th Wisconsin Territorial Assembly.

Enias Masters married Leah Tamson about 1844. They had at least four children, though one died in childhood. His first wife died in 1873, and he subsequently married Harriet J. Bennett in 1875, just a few months before his own death.

His only known son, Lucius Isaac Masters, served in the 1st Wisconsin Cavalry Regiment through the entire American Civil War.

== Notes ==
Wisconsin Senate
Preceded by James Hanrahan	Sergeant-at-Arms of the Wisconsin Senate; January 1851 – January 1852	Succeeded by Patrick Cosgrove
Preceded by Samuel C. Bean	Member of the Wisconsin Senate from the 23rd district January 3, 1859 – January 7, 1861	Succeeded by Edwin Montgomery
Legal offices
Preceded by Royal Tyler	Sheriff of Jefferson County, Wisconsin; January 1, 1849 – January 1, 1851	Succeeded by James Manville
