= Senator Clapp (disambiguation) =

Moses E. Clapp (1851–1929) was a U.S. Senator from Minnesota from 1901 to 1917. Senator Clapp may also refer to:

- Alfred C. Clapp (1903–1988), New Jersey State Senate
- Jeremiah Watkins Clapp (1814–1898), Mississippi State Senate
- Joseph Dorr Clapp (1811–1900), Wisconsin State Senate
