= Roger Thomas (Iowa politician) =

American politician

Roger D. Thomas
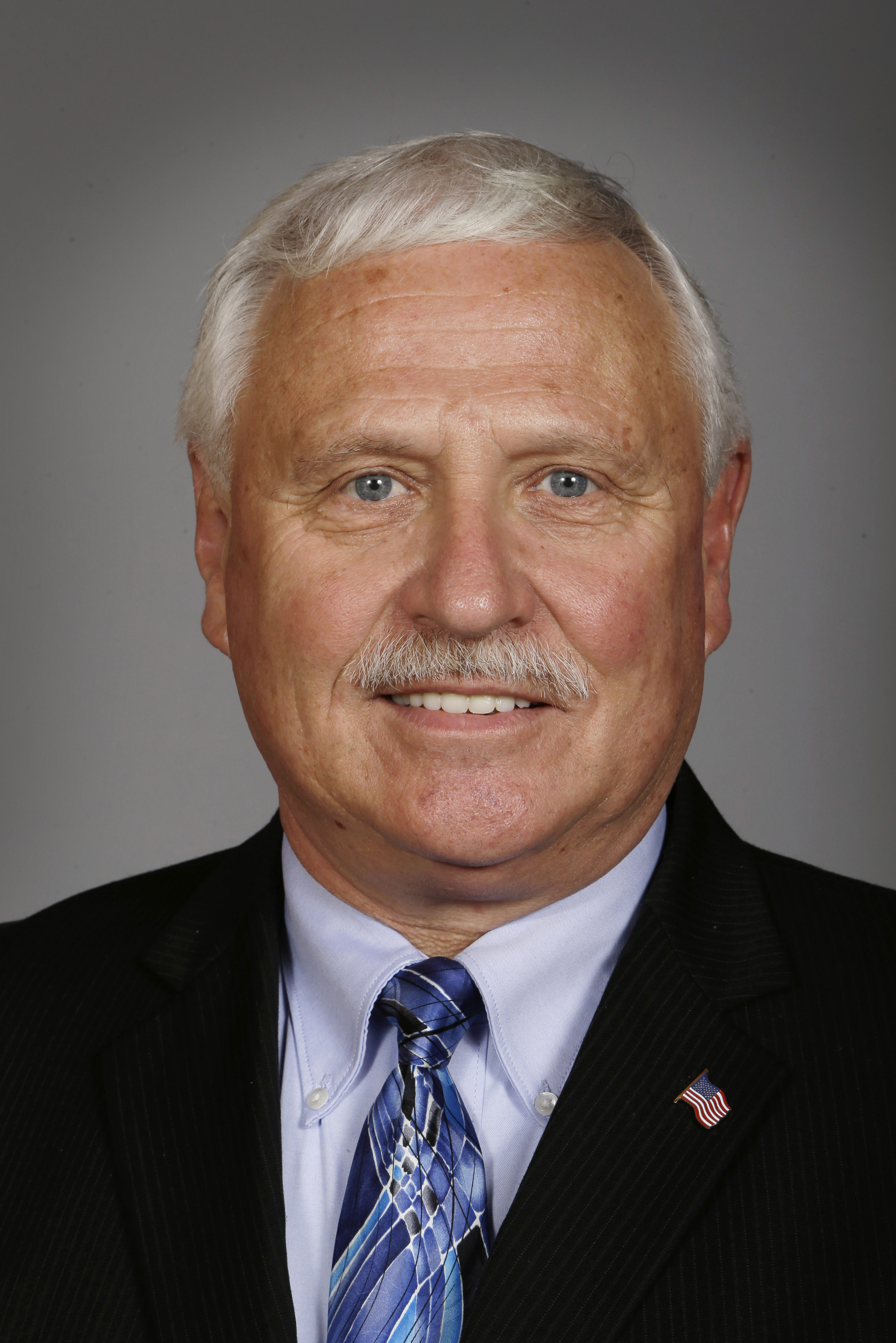

Member of the Iowa House of Representatives from the 55 district
- Incumbent
- Assumed office January 13, 2003
- Preceded by: Lee Rekow

Member of the Iowa House of Representatives from the 32nd and 24th district
- In office January 13, 1997 – January 7, 2001
- Preceded by: Roger Halvorson
- Succeeded by: Leigh Rekow

Personal details
- Born: December 13, 1950 (age 75) Oelwein, Iowa
- Party: Democratic
- Spouse: Rosemary
- Children: Rob, Ryan, and Rachelle
- Education: Upper Iowa University, Fayette IA
- Occupation: Economic Development Director
- Website: Thomas's website

Roger D. Thomas (born December 13, 1950) is the Iowa State Representative from the 55th District. He served in the Iowa House of Representatives from 1997 to 2001 in the 32nd District and from 2003 to 2011 in the 24th District. He received his BS from Upper Iowa University.

As of September 2011, Thomas serves on several committees in the Iowa House - the Natural Resources, Veterans Affairs, and Ways and Means committees. He also serves as ranking member of the Economic Growth Committee and as a member of the Economic Development Authority Board. His prior political experience includes service as a trustee for Northeast Iowa Community College.

== Electoral history ==
Thomas was first elected in 1996, defeating incumbent Republican Roger Halvorson. He left his House seat in 2001, in an unsuccessful bid for the Iowa Senate's 16th District, following incumbent Republican Lyle Zieman's retirement from the Senate. He lost the election to Republican Mark Zieman, the former senator's son. He was succeeded in the 32nd District by Republican Leigh Rekow. He contested the newly redrawn 24th District in 2003, defeating Rekow.

On March 13, 2014 Thomas announced he would not seek reelection to the Iowa House.

*incumbent

House District 32 and Senate District 16 elections (1996 – 2000)

Election	Political result	Candidate	Party	Votes	%
Iowa House of Representatives elections, 1996; District 32nd Turnout: 11,690	Democratic gain from Republican	Roger Thomas	Democratic	6,264	53.6
Iowa House of Representatives elections, 1996; District 32nd Turnout: 11,690	Democratic gain from Republican	Roger A. Halvorson*	Republican	5,424	46.4
Iowa House of Representatives elections, 1998; District 32; Turnout: 9,480	Democratic hold	Roger Thomas*	Democratic	5,905	62.3
Iowa House of Representatives elections, 1998; District 32; Turnout: 9,480	Democratic hold	Neil Schwake	Republican	3,575	37.7
Iowa Senate elections, 2000; District 16; Turnout: 24,673	Republican hold	Mark Zieman	Republican	13,847	56.1
Iowa Senate elections, 2000; District 16; Turnout: 24,673	Republican hold	Roger Thomas	Democratic	10,807	43.8

Election	Political result	Candidate	Party	Votes	%
Iowa House of Representatives elections, 2002; District 24; Turnout: 10,199	Democratic (newly redistricted)	Roger Thomas	Democratic	5,649	55.4
Iowa House of Representatives elections, 2002; District 24; Turnout: 10,199	Democratic (newly redistricted)	Leigh A. Rekow*	Republican	4,548	44.6
Iowa House of Representatives elections, 2004; District 24; Turnout: 13,672	Democratic hold	Roger Thomas*	Democratic	7,563	55.3
Iowa House of Representatives elections, 2004; District 24; Turnout: 13,672	Democratic hold	Gale Severson	Republican	6,105	44.7
Iowa House of Representatives elections, 2006; District 24	Democratic hold	Roger Thomas*	Democratic	unopposed	
Iowa House of Representatives elections, 2008; District 24	Democratic hold	Roger Thomas*	Democratic	unopposed	
Iowa House of Representatives elections, 2010; District 24; Turnout: 10,685	Democratic hold	Roger Thomas*	Democratic	5,282	49.4
Iowa House of Representatives elections, 2010; District 24; Turnout: 10,685	Democratic hold	Michael Breitbach	Republican	5,160	48.3

Iowa House of Representatives
Preceded by Roger Halvorson	32nd District; 1997 – 2001	Succeeded by Leigh Rekow
Preceded by Willard Jenkins	24th District; 2003 – present	Succeeded by Incumbent
