= Peter Van Vliet =

American farmer and politician (1801–1876)

Member of the Wisconsin State Assembly from the Racine 2nd district
- In office January 6, 1851 – January 5, 1852
- Preceded by: Stephen O. Bennett
- Succeeded by: Abram Gordon

Member of the House of Representatives of the Wisconsin Territory from Racine County
- In office November 7, 1842 – May 20, 1843 Serving with Philander Judson John Todd Trowbridge
- Preceded by: George Batchelder, Thomas E. Parmelee, Reuben H. Deming
- Succeeded by: John Todd Trowbridge, Levi Grant, Ezra Birchard

Personal details
- Born: April 30, 1801 Ferrisburgh, Vermont, U.S.
- Died: July 3, 1876 (aged 75) Racine, Wisconsin, U.S.
- Cause of death: Hemorrhage
- Resting place: Lakewood Cemetery, Lake City, Minnesota
- Party: Republican; Free Soil (1848–1854); Liberty (1844–1848); Whig (before 1844)
- Spouse: Sophia
- Children: Charlotte Van Vliet; (born 1824); Oran Van Vliet; (born 1826); Hannah Van Vliet; (born 1828); Leonard S. Van Vliet; (born 1830; died 1910)

Peter Van Vliet (April 30, 1801 – July 3, 1876) was an American farmer, politician, and Wisconsin pioneer. He was one of the earliest American settlers in Racine County, Wisconsin, and represented Racine County in the Wisconsin State Assembly during the 4th Wisconsin Legislature (1851). Before Wisconsin achieved statehood, he had also served in the Wisconsin Territory House of Representatives, and served six years as a member of the Racine County Board of Supervisors (1842, 1845, 1847, 1849, 1850, 1855). His surname was sometimes spelled Van Vleet.

Politically, he was originally a member of the Whig Party, and was elected to the Wisconsin Territory House of Representatives on the Whig ticket. He joined the abolitionist Liberty Party in the mid-1840s, then moved from that party to the Free Soil Party, when it was established in the late 1840s—he was elected to the state Assembly on the Free Soil ticket. Like most Free Soilers, he became a Republican when that party was established in 1854.

His son, Leonard Van Vliet, also served in the Wisconsin State Assembly.

== Biography ==
Peter Van Vliet was born in Ferrisburgh, Vermont, in 1801. He was raised and educated in Vermont. In 1840, he moved west to the Wisconsin Territory, bringing his wife and children. He became one of the earliest settlers in what is now Caledonia, Wisconsin, in Racine County.

Van Vliet quickly rose to prominence in his new home, in 1842, he was elected chairman of the Caledonia town board. At that time, the Wisconsin Territory government had just passed a law establishing county boards of supervisors to be composed of the various town chairmen from the county, thus Van Vliet became a member of the board of supervisors of Racine County. He would serve again in that capacity in 1845, 1847, 1849, 1850, and 1855.

After his first term on the county board, he was nominated for the Whig Party slate running for Wisconsin Territory House of Representatives in the fall 1842 election. Racine voters selected two Whigs and one Democrat in that legislative election; Van Vliet was the highest vote-getter of the candidates, receiving 527 votes, and went on to serve in the first session of the 4th Wisconsin Territorial Assembly. He resigned after the first session concluded it's business, on May 20, 1843.

Van Vliet was moved by the issue of slavery, and became a member of the short-lived abolitionist political party, the Liberty Party. He was active in local Liberty Party conventions, and stood for election at least three times on the Liberty Party ticket, running for county coroner in 1844 and 1846, running for Wisconsin Territory House of Representatives in 1845, and running for delegate to the constitutional convention of 1847–1848, but he lost all four elections.

In 1848, the Liberty Party made a pragmatic alliance with disaffected Democrats who opposed the expansion of slavery, creating the Free Soil Party. Van Vliet ran for Wisconsin State Assembly in 1850 on the Free Soil Party ticket, and was elected to serve in the 4th Wisconsin Legislature. He represented Racine County's 2nd Assembly district, which then comprised the towns of Caledonia, Mount Pleasant, Norway, and Raymond. He did not seek re-election in 1851.

Van Vliet was one of the earliest members and officers of the Racine County Agricultural Society, and was a frequent participant and judge at county fairs and expos.

After the passage of the Kansas–Nebraska Act in 1854, Van Vliet was involved in the rash of abolitionist political organizing that led to the creation of the Republican Party.

In his later years, Van Vliet moved to Lake City, Minnesota, where he remained active as a Republican, and worked toward the re-election of President Ulysses S. Grant in 1872.

In 1876, he returned briefly to Racine to visit friends. While there, he had a medical operation to lance a carbuncle on his neck. The carbuncle later reopened and bled. Van Vliet died from loss of blood on July 3, 1876.

== Personal life and family ==
Peter Van Vliet was the second of fifteen children born to Petrus Van Vliet Jr. and his wife Sarah (née Hough). The Van Vliet family were descendants of the colonist Adrian Gerritsen van Vliet, who emigrated from the Dutch Republic to New Netherland (New York) some time in the mid-17th century.

== Electoral history ==
=== Wisconsin Territory House (1842, 1845) ===
Wisconsin Territory House of Representatives, Racine County Election, 1842
Party	Candidate	Votes	%
General Election, September 26, 1842 (vote for 3)
Whig	Peter Van Vliet	527	19.02%
Whig	Philander Judson	514	18.55%
Democratic	John Todd Trowbridge	472	17.03%
Democratic	Levi Grant	460	16.60%
Whig	Richard E. Ela	457	16.49%
Democratic	C. J. True	341	12.31%
Total votes		2,771	100.0%
Whig gain from Democratic			
Whig gain from Democratic			
Democratic hold			

=== Wisconsin Constitutional Convention (1847) ===
Racine County Election for Wisconsin Constitutional Convention Delegates, 1847
Party	Candidate	Votes	%
Special Election, November 29, 1847 (vote for 8)
Democratic	Albert G. Cole	1,293	7.53%
Democratic	James DeNoon Reymert	1,285	7.48%
Democratic	Stephen A. Davenport	1,249	7.27%
Democratic	Theodore Secor	1,200	6.99%
Democratic	Andrew B. Jackson	1,195	6.96%
Democratic	Frederick S. Lovell	1,106	6.44%
Democratic	Samuel R. McClellan	1,090	6.35%
Democratic	Horace T. Sanders	1,080	6.29%
Whig	Philo Belden	925	5.39%
Whig	Elias Smith	865	5.04%
Whig	Philander Judson	830	4.83%
Whig	Hiram Tuttle	826	4.81%
Whig	Humphrey Mount	819	4.77%
Whig	Jeremiah Sanborn	812	4.73%
Whig	James Tinker	781	4.55%
Whig	Cyrus Udall	768	4.47%
Liberty	George Bennett	179	1.04%
Liberty	John R. Kendall	140	0.82%
Liberty	S. W. Wilson	131	0.76%
Liberty	David D. Burnham	131	0.76%
Liberty	Morris Smith	124	0.72%
Liberty	Jesse Stetson	120	0.70%
Liberty	Peter Van Vliet	120	0.70%
Liberty	Charles Hatch	101	0.59%
Total votes		17,170	100.0%
