= John Trowbridge =

John Trowbridge is the name of:

- John Trowbridge (physicist) (1843–1923), American physicist
- John Townsend Trowbridge (1827–1916), nineteenth century American author
- John Todd Trowbridge (1780–1858), nineteenth century American sea captain, businessman, pioneer, and legislator
