= 4th Wisconsin Territorial Assembly =

Legislative term of the Wisconsin Territory

←	3rd	5th	→

Overview
- Legislative body: Legislative Assembly of the Wisconsin Territory
- Meeting place: Madison, Wisconsin Territory
- Term: November 7, 1842 – January 4, 1847
- Election: September 26, 1842; September 25, 1843; September 23, 1844; September 22, 1845

Council
- Members: 13
- President: Moses M. Strong (D)^{(1st & 3rd sessions)}; Marshall Strong (D)^{(2nd session)}; Nelson Dewey (D)^{(4th session)}
- Party control: Democratic

House of Representatives
- Members: 26
- Speaker: Albert G. Ellis (D)^{(1st session)}; George H. Walker (D)^{(2nd & 3rd sessions)}; Mason C. Darling (D)^{(4th session)}
- Party control: Democratic

Sessions
- 1st: December 5, 1842 – April 17, 1843
- 2nd: December 4, 1843 – January 31, 1844
- 3rd: January 6, 1845 – February 24, 1845
- 4th: January 5, 1846 – February 3, 1846

The Fourth Legislative Assembly of the Wisconsin Territory convened from December 5, 1842, to April 17, 1843, from December 4, 1843, to January 31, 1844, from January 6, 1845, to February 24, 1845, and from January 5, 1846, to February 3, 1846, in regular session.

The first session of this Legislative Assembly was effected by a dispute with the Governor over whether or not the session was legally sanctioned by Congress. The session was adjourned twice, and finally came back into session on the governor's request in March 1843, when they finished their business. This Legislative Assembly was also unusually long, spanning four general elections (1843, 1844, 1845, & 1846).

== Major events ==
- May 22, 1843: The first major wagon train departed from Missouri with 1,000 settlers on the Oregon Trail to the northwest.
- May 24, 1844: The first electrical telegram was sent by Samuel Morse from the U.S. Capitol in Washington, D.C., to the B&O Railroad "outer depot" in Baltimore, saying "What hath God wrought".
- June 21, 1844: Nathaniel P. Tallmadge appointed 3rd Governor of the Wisconsin Territory.
- September 23, 1844: Morgan Lewis Martin elected delegate to the United States House of Representatives from Wisconsin Territory's at-large congressional district.
- November 1 – December 4, 1844: James K. Polk elected President of the United States.
- January 23, 1845: The United States Congress established a uniform date for the holding of federal elections—the first Tuesday after the first Monday in November, on even-numbered years.
- March 1, 1845: President John Tyler signed a bill approving the annexation of Texas.
- March 4, 1845: Inauguration of James K. Polk as the 11th President of the United States.
- April 8, 1845: Henry Dodge appointed 4th Governor of the Wisconsin Territory.
- December 2, 1845: President James K. Polk announced to Congress that the Monroe Doctrine should be strictly enforced, and that the United States should aggressively expand into the West.
- December 29, 1845: Texas was admitted to the United States as the 28th U.S. state.
- April 25, 1846: The Thornton Affair occurred on disputed land between Texas and Mexico, initiating the Mexican–American War.
- May 13, 1846: The United States officially declared war on Mexico.
- June 10, 1846: The California Republic declared independence from Mexico.
- August 3, 1846: Abraham Lincoln was elected to the United States House of Representatives from Illinois's 7th congressional district.
- October 5 – December 16, 1846: The first Wisconsin constitutional convention was held in Madison, Wisconsin Territory.

== Major legislation ==
- March 23, 1843: An Act fixing the time of holding the annual sessions of the Legislative Assembly, and for other purposes.
- April 10, 1843: An Act to repeal an act incorporating the State Bank of Wisconsin.
- April 17, 1843: An Act to abolish certain offices therein named. Abolished the offices of "district attorney" which were previously multi-county officials. County governments were instead empowered by this act to each appoint a prosecuting attorney.
- April 17, 1843: An Act to provide for completing a new roof upon the capitol, and for other purposes.
- April 17, 1843: An Act concerning removals from office. Required the Governor to make written notification when removing a person from office. The act was originally vetoed by the Governor, but the veto was overridden by the Assembly.
- January 24, 1844: An Act prescribing the time of holding the annual session of the Legislative Assembly. Set the start of the legislative session as the first Monday of January.
- January 26, 1844: An Act to submit to the people of Wisconsin the question of the expediency of forming a state government.
- January 30, 1845: Resolution to declare the name of the Territory, "Wisconsin."
- January 31, 1846: An Act in relation to the formation of a State Government in Wisconsin.

== Sessions ==
- 1st session: December 5, 1842 – April 17, 1843
- 2nd session: December 4, 1843 – January 31, 1844
- 3rd session: January 6, 1845 – February 24, 1845
- 4th session: January 5, 1846 – February 3, 1846

== Leadership ==
=== Council President ===
- Moses M. Strong (D) – during the 1st & 3rd sessions
- Marshall Strong (D) – during the 2nd session
- Nelson Dewey (D) – during the 4th session

=== Speaker of the House of Representatives ===
- Albert G. Ellis (D) – during 1st session
- George H. Walker (D) – during 2nd & 3rd sessions
- Mason C. Darling (D) – during 4th session

== Members ==
=== Members of the Council ===
Counties	Councillor	Session(s)				Party
Counties	Councillor	1st	2nd	3rd	4th	Party
Brown, Calumet, Fond du Lac, Manitowoc, Marquette, Portage, Sheboygan & Winnebago	Morgan L. Martin	✓	✓			Dem.
Brown, Calumet, Fond du Lac, Manitowoc, Marquette, Portage, Sheboygan & Winnebago	Randall Wilcox			✓	✓	Dem.
Crawford, Chippewa, La Pointe, & St. Croix	Theophilus La Chappelle	✓	✓			Dem.
Crawford, Chippewa, La Pointe, & St. Croix	Wiram Knowlton			✓	✓	Ind.
Dane, Dodge, Green, Jefferson, & Sauk	Lucius I. Barber	✓	✓			Whig
Dane, Dodge, Green, Jefferson, & Sauk	John Catlin			✓	✓	Dem.
Grant	John H. Rountree	✓	✓	✓	✓	Whig
Grant	Nelson Dewey	✓	✓	✓	✓	Dem.
Iowa	Moses M. Strong	✓	✓	✓	✓	Dem.
Milwaukee & Washington	Hans Crocker	✓	✓			Dem.
Milwaukee & Washington	Lemuel White	✓	✓			Dem.
Milwaukee & Washington	David Newland	✓	✓			Dem.
Milwaukee & Washington	Adam E. Ray			✓		
Milwaukee & Washington	James Kneeland			✓	✓	Dem.
Milwaukee & Washington	Jacob H. Kimball			✓	✓	
Milwaukee & Washington	Curtis Reed				✓	Dem.
Racine	Consider Heath	✓ (Note: Did not take his seat until March 6, 1843)				Whig
Racine	Peter D. Hugunin	✓				Whig
Racine	Michael Frank		✓	✓	✓	Dem.
Racine	Marshall Strong		✓	✓	✓	Dem.
Rock & Walworth	Charles M. Baker	✓	✓	✓	✓	Dem.
Rock & Walworth	Edward V. Whiton	✓	✓	✓	✓	Whig

=== Members of the House of Representatives ===
Members of the House of Representatives for the Fourth Wisconsin Territorial Assembly:

Counties	Representative	Session(s)				Party
Counties	Representative	1st	2nd	3rd	4th	Party
Brown, Calumet, Fond du Lac, Manitowoc, Marquette, Portage, Sheboygan & Winnebago	Albert G. Ellis	✓	✓			Dem.
Brown, Calumet, Fond du Lac, Manitowoc, Marquette, Portage, Sheboygan & Winnebago	Mason C. Darling	✓	✓	✓	✓	Dem.
Brown, Calumet, Fond du Lac, Manitowoc, Marquette, Portage, Sheboygan & Winnebago	David Agry	✓	✓			Dem.
Brown, Calumet, Fond du Lac, Manitowoc, Marquette, Portage, Sheboygan & Winnebago	Abraham Brawley			✓	✓	Dem.
Brown, Calumet, Fond du Lac, Manitowoc, Marquette, Portage, Sheboygan & Winnebago	William Fowler			✓		
Brown, Calumet, Fond du Lac, Manitowoc, Marquette, Portage, Sheboygan & Winnebago	Elisha Morrow				✓	
Crawford, Chippewa, La Pointe, & St. Croix	John H. Manahan	✓	✓			Dem.
Crawford, Chippewa, La Pointe, & St. Croix	James Fisher			✓	✓	Dem.
Dane, Dodge, Green, Jefferson, & Sauk	Isaac H. Palmer	✓	✓			Whig
Dane, Dodge, Green, Jefferson, & Sauk	Lyman Crossman	✓	✓			Dem.
Dane, Dodge, Green, Jefferson, & Sauk	Robert Masters	✓	✓			Dem.
Dane, Dodge, Green, Jefferson, & Sauk	Charles S. Bristol			✓		
Dane, Dodge, Green, Jefferson, & Sauk	Noah Phelps			✓	✓	Dem.
Dane, Dodge, Green, Jefferson, & Sauk	George H. Slaughter			✓		Dem.
Dane, Dodge, Green, Jefferson, & Sauk	Mark R. Clapp				✓	
Dane, Dodge, Green, Jefferson, & Sauk	William M. Dennis				✓	Dem.
Grant	Franklin Z. Hicks	✓	✓	✓		Whig
Grant	Alonzo Platt	✓	✓			Whig
Grant	Glendower M. Price	✓	✓			Whig
Grant	Thomas P. Burnett			✓	✓	
Grant	Thomas Cruson			✓	✓	Whig
Grant	Armstead C. Brown				✓	Whig
Iowa	Robert M. Long	✓	✓			Dem.
Iowa	Moses Meeker	✓	✓			Dem.
Iowa	William S. Hamilton	✓				Whig
Iowa	George Messersmith		✓			Whig
Iowa	James Collins			✓		Whig
Iowa	Robert C. Hoard			✓	✓	
Iowa	Solomon Oliver			✓		
Iowa	Henry M. Billings				✓	Dem.
Iowa	Charles Pole				✓	Dem.
Milwaukee & Washington	Andrew E. Elmore	✓	✓			Whig
Milwaukee & Washington	Benjamin Hunkins	✓	✓			Dem.
Milwaukee & Washington	Thomas H. Olin	✓	✓			Dem.
Milwaukee & Washington	Jonathan Parsons	✓	✓			Dem.
Milwaukee & Washington	Jared Thompson	✓	✓			Whig
Milwaukee & Washington	George H. Walker	✓	✓	✓		Dem.
Milwaukee & Washington	Charles E. Brown			✓		
Milwaukee & Washington	Pitts Ellis			✓		Dem.
Milwaukee & Washington	Byron Kilbourn			✓		Dem.
Milwaukee & Washington	Benjamin H. Mooers			✓	✓	Dem.
Milwaukee & Washington	William Shew			✓		Dem.
Milwaukee & Washington	Samuel H. Barstow				✓	
Milwaukee & Washington	John Crawford				✓	Dem.
Milwaukee & Washington	James Magone				✓	
Milwaukee & Washington	Luther Parker				✓	Dem.
Milwaukee & Washington	William H. Thomas				✓	Dem.
Racine	Philander Judson	✓				Whig
Racine	John T. Trowbridge	✓	✓			Dem.
Racine	Peter Van Vliet	✓				Whig
Racine	Levi Grant		✓			Dem.
Racine	Ezra Birchard		✓			Dem.
Racine	Robert McClellan			✓		
Racine	Orson Sheldon			✓	✓	
Racine	Albert G. Northway			✓		
Racine	Andrew B. Jackson				✓	Dem.
Racine	Julius Wooster				✓	
Rock & Walworth	John Hopkins	✓	✓			Whig
Rock & Walworth	James Tripp	✓	✓			Whig
Rock & Walworth	John M. Capron	✓	✓			Whig
Rock & Walworth	William A. Bartlett	✓	✓			Dem.
Rock & Walworth	Stephen Field			✓		
Rock & Walworth	Jesse C. Mills			✓		Whig
Rock & Walworth	Salmon Thomas			✓		Whig
Rock & Walworth	Jesse Moore			✓		Whig
Rock & Walworth	Ira Jones				✓ (Note: Only represented Rock County.)	
Rock & Walworth	Caleb Crosswell				✓ (Note: Only represented Walworth County.)	
Rock & Walworth	Warren Earl				✓	
Rock & Walworth	Gaylord Graves				✓	Dem.

== Employees ==
=== Council employees ===
- Secretary:
  - John V. Ingersol, 1st session, resigned March 31, 1843
  - John P. Sheldon, 1st session, following Ingersol's resignation
  - Ben C. Eastman, 2nd, 3rd & 4th sessions, resigned Jan. 19, 1846
  - William Rudolph Smith, 4th session, following Eastman's resignation
- Sergeant-at-Arms:
  - Charles C. Brown, 1st session
  - G. C. S. Vail, 2nd session
  - Charles H. Larkin, 3rd session
  - Joseph Brisbois, 4th session

=== House employees ===
- Chief Clerk:
  - John Catlin, 1st & 2nd sessions
  - La Fayette Kellogg, 3rd & 4th sessions
- Sergeant-at-Arms:
  - William S. Anderson, 1st session
  - J. W. Trowbridge, 2nd session
  - Chauncey Davis, 3rd session
  - David Bonham, 4th session
