= Daniel Lothian =

American politician

Daniel Lothian (February 2, 1815 – January 30, 1892) was a Scottish-born American politician.

Daniel Lothian was born in Perthshire on February 2, 1815. After his father died, Lothian and his mother moved to Canada in 1823, then subsequently settled in Lamoille County, Vermont. Lothian married Harriet Senbury in 1837, and moved with her to New York City. In 1852, the couple moved to Cedar Rapids, Iowa.

Lothian was elected to a single term on the Iowa House of Representatives between December 1, 1856, and January 10, 1858, as a Republican for District 32. After stepping down from the state legislature, Lothian's 1857 appointment as Linn County judge came into effect, and he held the post until 1864. During his judgeship, Lothian lived in Marion.

Around 1887, Lothian moved to Clay Center, Kansas. Roughly six months before his death, he relocated to San Diego, California, for health reasons. He died on January 30, 1892.
