= Robert Matheson =

Robert Matheson may refer to:

- Robert Matheson (architect) (1808–1877), Scottish architect
- Robert Matheson (entomologist)
- Robert J. Matheson (1907–1956), American politician in Wisconsin
- Bob Matheson (1944–1994), National Football League player
