= John Garber =

John Garber may refer to:

- John Garber (judge) (1833–1908), justice of the Supreme Court of Nevada
- John Garber (politician) (1818–1886), member of the Iowa House of Representatives
