= Iowa's 32nd House of Representatives district =

American legislative district

House District 32
- Type: District of the Lower house
- Location: Iowa
- Representative: Jennifer Konfrst
- Parent organization: Iowa General Assembly

The 32nd District of the Iowa House of Representatives in the state of Iowa. It is currently composed of part of Polk County.

== Current elected officials ==
Jennifer Konfrst is the representative currently representing the district.

== Past representatives ==
The district has previously been represented by:

- Richard W. Welden, 1971–1973
- Kenneth D. Miller, 1973–1982
- Paul Copenhaver, 1982–1983
- Roger Halvorson, 1983–1997
- Roger Thomas, 1997–2001
- Leigh Rekow, 2001–2003
- Steven Lukan, 2003–2013
- Ruth Ann Gaines, 2013–2023
- Jennifer Konfrst, 2023–2027
