= Robert Masters (Wisconsin pioneer) =

Pioneer settler of Wisconsin

Coroner of Jefferson County, Wisconsin Territory
- In office January 1, 1846 – January 1, 1847
- Preceded by: E. G. Darling
- Succeeded by: E. G. Darling

Member of the House of Representatives of the Wisconsin Territory for Dane, Dodge, Green, Jefferson, and Sauk counties
- In office November 7, 1842 – January 6, 1845 Serving with Isaac H. Palmer & Lyman Crossman
- Preceded by: Lucius I. Barber & Daniel S. Sutherland
- Succeeded by: Charles S. Bristol, Noah Phelps, & George H. Slaughter

Register of Deeds of Jefferson County, Wisconsin Territory
- In office September 1839 – November 7, 1842
- Preceded by: Position established
- Succeeded by: G. F. Markley

Personal details
- Born: c.1787 Pennsylvania, U.S.
- Died: January 23, 1867 (aged 79–80)
- Resting place: Rock River Cemetery, Jefferson, Wisconsin
- Party: Democratic
- Spouses: Olive Masters (died 1849); Lucina Chaffee (m. 1851–1867)
- Children: Emilio Leo Masters^{(b. 1813; died 1888)}; Enias D. Masters^{(b. 1818; died 1875)}; Eschyllus Masters^{(b. 1820; died 1864)}; Emogene Lucy Masters^{(b. 1822; died 1841)}; Evaline L. (Byington)^{(b. 1824; died 1888)}; Emma Olive Masters^{(b. 1826; died 1911)}; Emmett Masters^{(b. 1829; died 1892)}; Emanda Masters^{(b. 1830)}; Ermina (Aten)^{(b. 1833; died 1884)}; Egbert Masters^{(b. 1834; died 1880)}; Elbert Masters^{(b. 1838; died 1843)}; Emandus Addus Masters^{(b. 1838; died 1896)}
- Occupation: Sailor, farmer

Robert Masters (c.1787 – January 23, 1867) was an American sailor, politician, and Wisconsin pioneer. He was one of the first settlers of Jefferson, Wisconsin, and represented Jefferson County in the 4th Wisconsin Territorial Assembly. He was also the first register of deeds of Jefferson County.

== Biography ==
Robert Masters was born in the state of Pennsylvania about 1787. At some point he moved to New York, where most of his children were born.

In the Winter of 1836, he traveled from Milwaukee west into the wilderness of the Wisconsin Territory with his daughter and a number of other settlers. They reached the Rock River on Christmas Eve, then spent Christmas with an earlier settler in what is now the town of Aztalan. Masters set out a claim near the junction of the Crawfish River with the Rock River, roughly the site of what is now Jefferson, Wisconsin. In January 1837, he erected a rough shanty on the property and prepared to establish a farm, while his daughter Emogene kept the house.

In the Spring of 1837, the territorial legislature approved an act to create Jefferson County, and Masters was appointed a commissioner for establishing the county seat. They selected a site for a village near Masters' claim, which became the city of Jefferson. After the county was established, Masters was elected the first register of deeds, serving from 1839 through 1842, he simultaneously served as one of the county commissioners in 1841, and was on the board which approved the contract for the original county courthouse.

Subsequently, the town of Jefferson was established, and Masters served as the first chairman of the town's board of trustees.

In the 1842 Fall elections, Masters was chosen as a representative to the first session of the 4th Wisconsin Territorial Assembly, and was returned for the second session. His district comprised all of Dane, Dodge, Green, Jefferson, and Sauk counties, and elected three at-large representatives.

After his term in the territorial legislature, Master's was elected a justice of the peace and coroner of Jefferson County. After Wisconsin statehood, Masters became involved in the founding of the Jefferson County Agricultural Society, and served as an officer in that organization in the 1850s and 1860s.

Masters died on January 22, 1867.

== Personal life and family ==
Robert Masters was married twice. He had at least twelve children with his first wife, Olive, before her death in 1849. In 1851, he married Lucina Chaffee, who survived him. His children were also active in politics and local affairs in Jefferson County, Wisconsin.

All of Masters' children's names begin with the letter E. The spelling of the names is often inconsistent.

- Emilio moved to Ohio and later Kansas.
- Enias also settled in Jefferson in the early years, he was an early sheriff of Jefferson County, served as sergeant-at-arms of the Wisconsin Senate, and was later elected to the State Senate himself.
- Eschyllus settled in Jefferson with his father in the early years, and was one of the first overseers of roads in the town of Jefferson.
- Emogene was the first child to travel with her father to Jefferson and tended his house for him. She died of disease there in October 1841, at age 19.
- Evaline married Jonathan L. Byington in Wisconsin and later moved to California.
- Emma came to Wisconsin and married Edwin T. Wright, they moved to Adams County, Wisconsin, and later to Gresham, Oregon.
- Emmett came to Wisconsin, but then went west to California in 1851, where he remained for the rest of his life.
- Ermina married George Aten and moved to California.
- Egbert also moved to California.
- Elbert died at age 5 in Wisconsin
- Emandus served as an enlisted man in the 1st Wisconsin Cavalry Regiment during the American Civil War, and later settled in Missouri.

Political offices
New county government	Register of Deeds of Jefferson County, Wisconsin Territory; September 1839 – November 7, 1842	Succeeded by G. F. Markley
Preceded by E. G. Darling	Coroner of Jefferson County, Wisconsin Territory; January 1, 1846 – January 1, 1847	Succeeded by E. G. Darling
