= Steven Lukan =

American politician (born 1978)

Steven F. Lukan
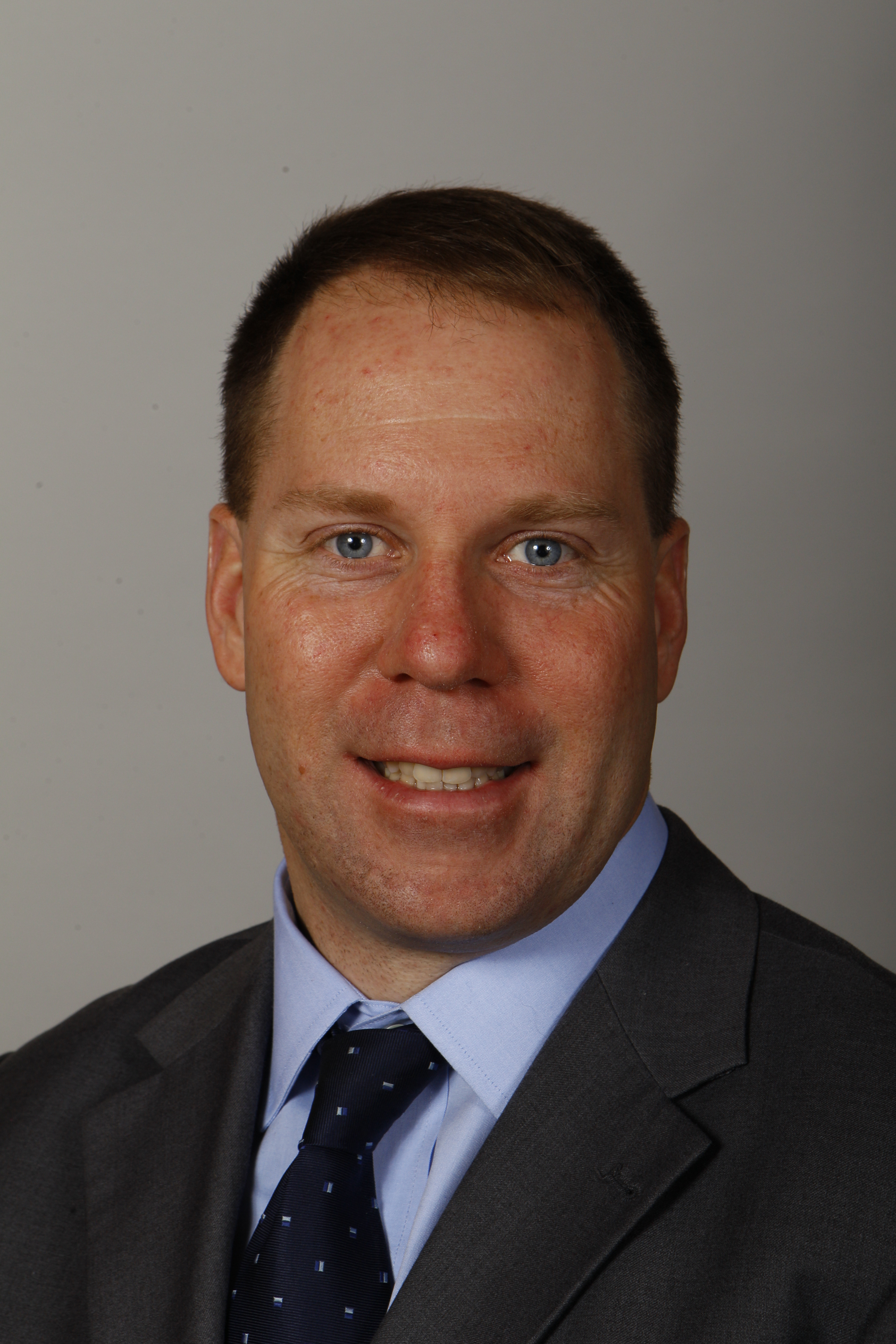

Member of the Iowa House of Representatives from the 32nd district
- Incumbent
- Assumed office 2002
- Preceded by: Leigh A. Rekow

Personal details
- Born: December 17, 1978 (age 47) New Vienna, Iowa, U.S.
- Party: Republican
- Website: Lukan's website

Steven F. Lukan (born December 17, 1978) is the Iowa State Representative from the 32nd District. He has served in the Iowa House of Representatives since 2002.

Lukan currently serves on several committees in the Iowa House: appropriations, commerce, natural resources, and public safety. He also serves as the ranking member of the Justice System Appropriations Subcommittee.

Lukan was reelected in 2006 with 8,183 votes (66%), defeating Democratic opponent Tom Avenarius.

Iowa House of Representatives
Preceded by Leigh A. Rekow	32nd District; 2002 – present	Succeeded by Incumbent
