= George Batchelder =

George Batchelder may refer to:

- George Batchelder, owner of the George Batchelder House in Reading, Massachusetts
- George A. Batchelder (1907–1975), American politician from Arizona
- George Washington Batchelder (1826–1910), American politician from Minnesota
- George Batchelder (Wisconsin pioneer) (1807–1871), American politician
