= Milton C. Garber =

American judge

Judge Milton C. Garber
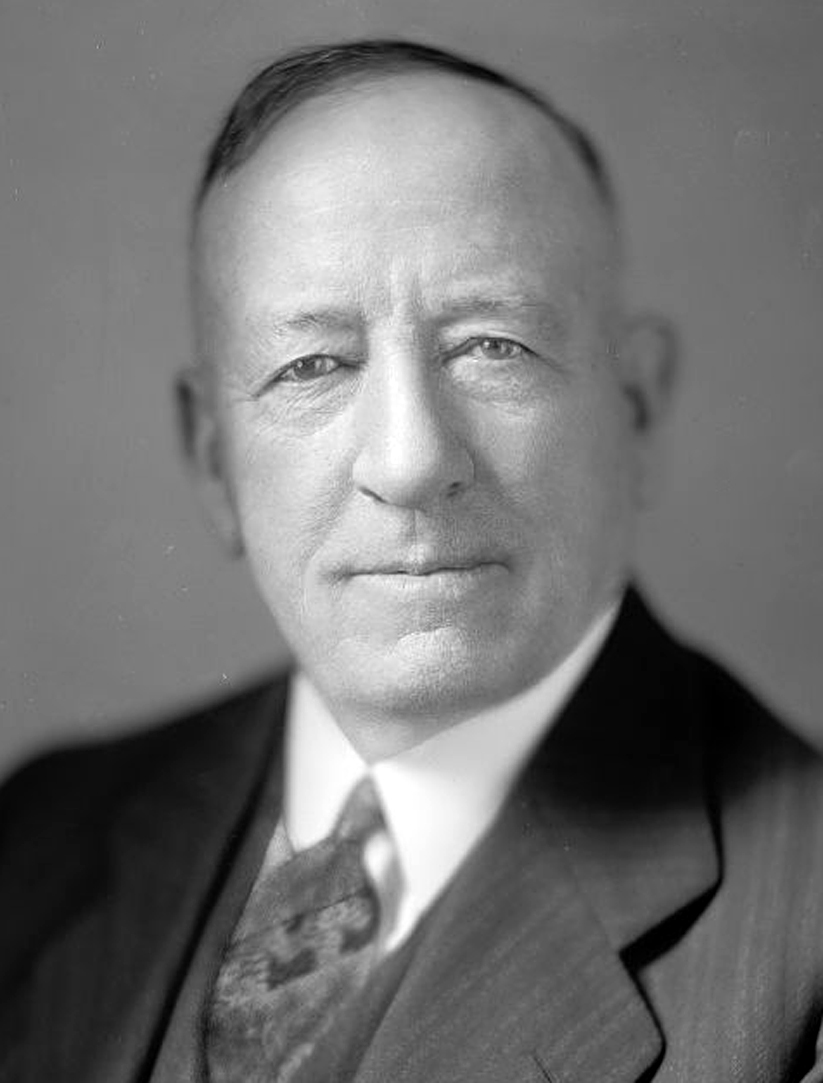

Member of the U.S. House of Representatives from Oklahoma's 8th district
- In office March 4, 1923 – March 3, 1933
- Preceded by: Manuel Herrick
- Succeeded by: Ernest W. Marland

Probate Judge of Garfield County
- In office 1902–1906

Associate Justice of the Supreme Court of the Territory of Oklahoma and Trial Judge of the Fifth Judicial District
- In office 1906–1907

Judge of the Twentieth Judicial District
- In office 1908–1912

Mayor of Enid, Oklahoma
- In office 1919–1921

Personal details
- Born: Milton Cline Garber; November 30, 1867 Humboldt County, California, U.S.
- Died: September 12, 1948 (aged 80) Alexandria, Minnesota, U.S.
- Resting place: Enid, Oklahoma
- Party: Republican
- Parent: Martin Garber (father)
- Relatives: John Garber (uncle)
- Education: Upper Iowa University; University of Iowa

Milton Cline Garber (November 30, 1867 – September 12, 1948) was a U.S. representative from Oklahoma. He also served as an associate justice of the Oklahoma Territory before Oklahoma became a state. In 1942, he was inducted into the Oklahoma Hall of Fame.

== Personal life ==
Milton Cline Garber was born to Martin Garber, a member of the Iowa State Senate, and Lucy Rife on November 30, 1867, in Humboldt County, California. He grew up on a farm in Eastport, Iowa. He attended Upper Iowa University at Fayette from 1887 to 1890, and the University of Iowa College of Law from 1891 to 1893.

On October 30, 1900, Garber married Lucy M. Bradley of Moberly, Missouri. They had three daughters, named Lucy Ann and Elizabeth, and Ruth, and also two sons, Martin D. Garber and Milton B Garber.

== Career ==
Milton Garber, his brother (Bert A. Garber), and his father (Martin Garber) participated in the Land Run of 1893, establishing the town of Garber, Oklahoma, named after his family. He was admitted to the bar in 1893 and commenced the practice of law in Guthrie, Oklahoma, then the Oklahoma capitol. His father and brother operated a general store.

He established the Northwest Oklahoma Junior Livestock Show, maintaining an interest in agriculture. He was also a partial owner of the Oxford Hotel and the Enid Radiophone Company, assisting in the establishment of radio station KCRC. M.C. Garber and B.A. Garber also opened the Garber oil fields.

=== Judicial Positions (1902-1912) ===
Following the resignation of James K. Beauchamp, M.C. Garber was appointed Probate Judge of Garfield County in 1902 and subsequently elected in 1904. He was appointed Associate Justice of the Supreme Court of the Territory of Oklahoma and Trial Judge of the fifth judicial district in 1906 by President Theodore Roosevelt, serving in these capacities until Oklahoma became a state. Garber was elected judge of the twentieth judicial district in 1908 and served until 1918. He was a candidate in the 1910 United States House of Representatives elections in Oklahoma.

=== Enid Mayor (1919-1921) ===
He served as mayor of Enid, Oklahoma from 1919 to 1921. During his tenure, Convention Hall was constructed to memorialize Garfield County World War I veterans.

=== Congressional Service (1923-1933) ===
Garber was elected for five terms as a Republican to the United States Congress. He served in the Sixty-eighth through the Seventy-second Congresses (March 4, 1923 – March 3, 1933). In 1932, he failed to win re-election to the Seventy-third Congress. E. W. Marland, Democrat of Ponca City, Oklahoma succeeded him in office. While in office, Garber served on the following committees: Expenditures in the Interior Department, Indian Affairs, Irrigation and Reclamation, Public Buildings and Grounds, Roads, and Interstate and Foreign Commerce.

=== Enid Publishing Company ===
In 1920, Garber purchased the Enid Morning News, which later merged with the Enid Eagle in 1923. He became the editor and co-publisher of the Enid Publishing Company, maintaining an active role following his congressional career. His son, Milton B. Garber, later became editor.

== Death ==
Milton Garber died of a heart attack in Alexandria, Minnesota, September 12, 1948. His funeral service, held on the anniversary of the land run, was led by Reverend Isaac Newton McCash, President Emeritus of Phillips University. He is buried in Memorial Park Cemetery, in Enid, Oklahoma.

U.S. House of Representatives
| Preceded by Manuel Herrick | Member of the U.S. House of Representatives from Oklahoma's 8th congressional district 1923–1933 | Succeeded by E. W. Marland |
