= Levi Grant =

American politician (1810–1891)

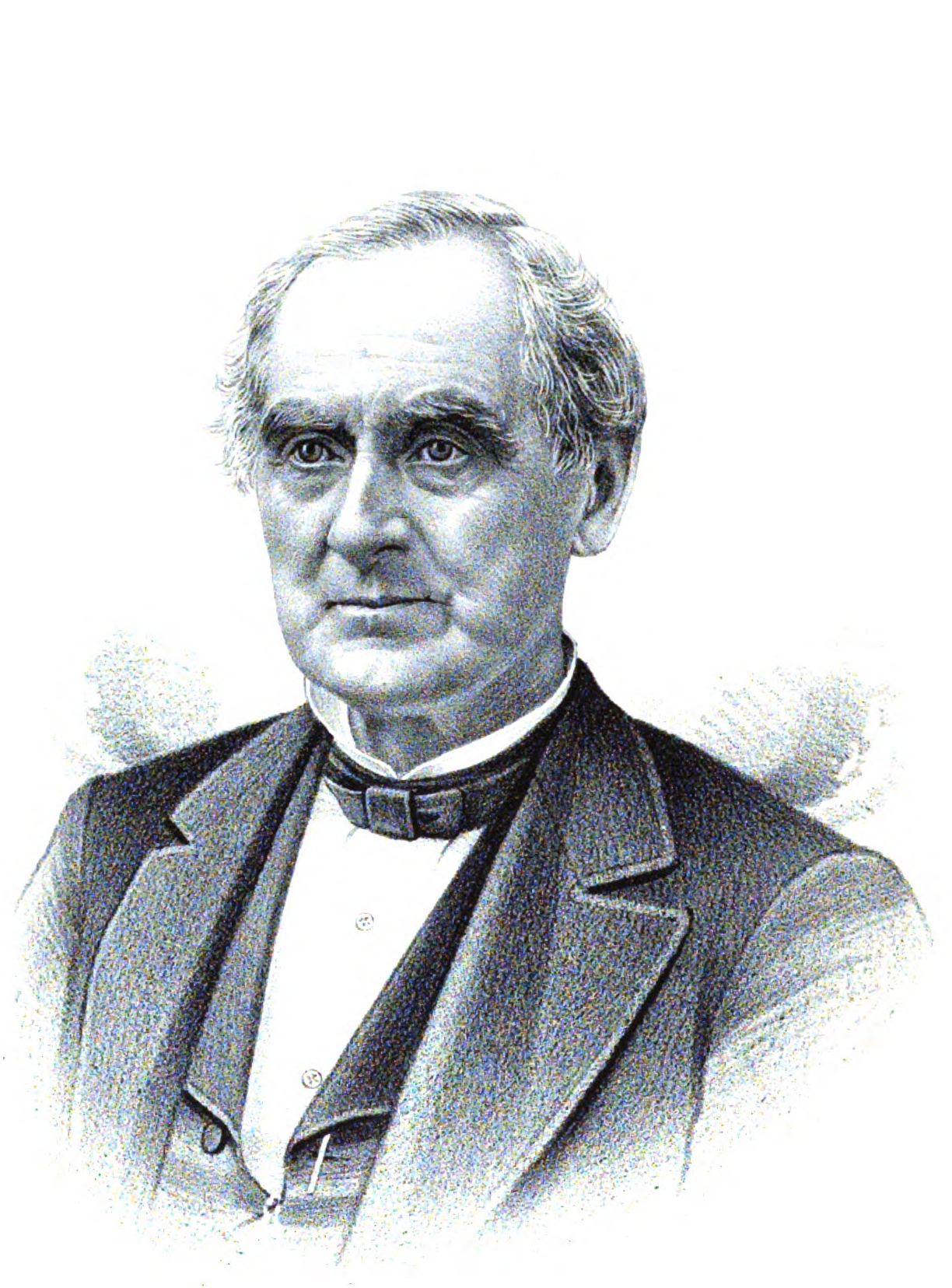
- From Portrait and Biographical Album of Racine and Kenosha Counties, Wisconsin (1892)

Coroner of Kenosha County, Wisconsin
- In office January 7, 1861 – January 3, 1863
- Preceded by: Henry Lines
- Succeeded by: Harvey Durkee

Member of the Wisconsin Senate from the 8th district
- In office January 6, 1854 – September 1854
- Preceded by: John Sharpstein
- Succeeded by: Francis Paddock

Chairman of the Board of Supervisors of Racine County, Wisconsin
- In office January 1, 1849 – January 7, 1850
- Preceded by: G. W. Willis
- Succeeded by: William H. Addington

Member of the House of Representatives of the Wisconsin Territory for Racine County
- In office December 4, 1843 – January 6, 1845 Serving with John Todd Trowbridge & Ezra Birchard
- Preceded by: Philander Judson, John Todd Trowbridge, & Peter Van Vliet
- Succeeded by: Robert McClellan, Orson Sheldon, & Albert G. Northway

Personal details
- Born: April 25, 1810 New Berlin, New York, U.S.
- Died: April 12, 1891 (aged 80) Kenosha, Wisconsin, U.S.
- Resting place: Green Ridge Cemetery, Kenosha, Wisconsin
- Spouse: Frances E. Etheridge (m. 1832; died 1887)
- Children: Julia (Durkee)^{(b. 1837; died 1924)}; Emory Levi Grant^{(b. 1844; died 1929)}
- Occupation: Farmer, lumber trader

Military service
- Allegiance: United States
- Branch/service: Wisconsin Militia
- Years of service: 1855–1856
- Rank: Brig. General

Levi Grant (April 25, 1810 – April 12, 1891) was an American farmer, businessman, and pioneer of Kenosha County, Wisconsin. He was a member of the Wisconsin State Senate, representing Kenosha County in the 1854 session. He was a distant cousin of Ulysses S. Grant.

== Biography ==
Levi Grant was born on April 25, 1810, in New Berlin, New York. He received a basic education, and then, at age 15, went to work as an apprentice in paper manufacturing. He pursued that profession and worked for five years as foreman of a paper mill in Greene County, New York. In this role, he produced the paper for the first edition of the Albany Evening Journal, edited by Thurlow Weed.

In 1836, he went west to the Wisconsin Territory and settled in the town of Bristol, in what is now Kenosha County, Wisconsin. There, he purchased and cultivated a 300-acre tract of land into a prosperous farm.

Grant was first elected to public office in the Fall of 1843, when he was chosen to represent Racine County (which then also comprised all of the territory of the present Kenosha County) in the House of Representatives of the 4th Wisconsin Territorial Assembly. He next served in the Racine County board of supervisors in 1849, and was elected chairman for that term.

Grant was originally a member of the Democratic Party, but joined the Republican Party after it was organized in 1854. He was elected to the Wisconsin State Senate in 1853 running on the Democratic ticket, but resigned during the 1854 session. His resignation coincided with his change in party. Nevertheless, in 1855 he was appointed a brigadier general of the state militia by Governor William A. Barstow.

He returned to office as a Republican, serving on the Kenosha city council in 1860, 1861, 1864, and 1871. He also won election to the county-wide office of coroner in 1860, serving a two-year term. This was the last session before the division of Racine and Kenosha counties.

He sold his farm in 1856 and moved into the city of Kenosha, where he became more involved in business pursuits. That same year he established a partnership with Nathan R. Allen in a tannery business. His principle business interest was in lumber, which he carried on for nearly 30 years in partnership with his son, Emory. In 1875, in the midst of the Long Depression, he used his lumber interests to purchase a run-down hotel in downtown Kenosha and refurbish it into a landmark. The hotel re-opened to fanfare in 1876, and was known for 25 years as the "Grant House". It changed hands several times after Grant's death, and was torn down in the 1920s.

Grant died at his home in Kenosha on April 12, 1891.

== Personal life and family ==
Levi Grant was the only child of Joshua Grant and his wife Esther (née Naramore). The Grants were descendants of Scottish American immigrants, and were distant cousins of Ulysses S. Grant.

Grant married Frances E. Etheridge on April 25, 1832. Frances was a daughter of Nathaniel Etheridge, a farmer in Greene County, New York, who died serving in the War of 1812. They had two children together.

Their son, Emory Levi Grant, also became a prominent businessman in Kenosha and served on the city council. After his father's retirement, he continued the family lumber business in partnership with George D. Head. He was also a member of the original board of directors of the Zalmon G. Simmons Library in Kenosha.

Wisconsin Senate
Preceded by John Sharpstein	Member of the Wisconsin Senate from the 8th district January 6, 1854 – September 1854	Succeeded by Francis Paddock
Political offices
Preceded by G. W. Willis	Chairman of the Board of Supervisors of Racine County, Wisconsin; January 1, 1849 – January 7, 1850	Succeeded by William H. Addington
Preceded by Henry Lines	Coroner of Kenosha County, Wisconsin; January 7, 1861 – January 3, 1863	Succeeded by Harvey Durkee
