= Robert Mutter =

American politician

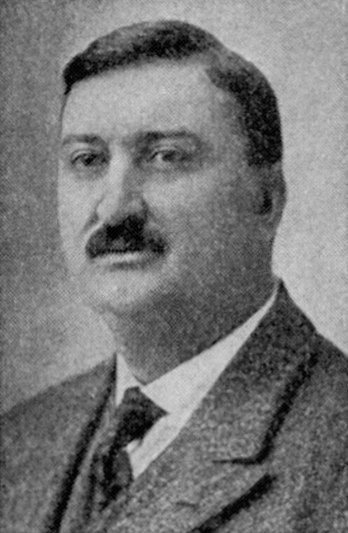

Member of the Wisconsin State Assembly
- In office 1919

Personal details
- Born: December 20, 1873 Dover, Wisconsin, US
- Died: November 7, 1948 (aged 74) San Benito, Texas, US
- Party: Republican
- Occupation: Farmer, businessman, politician

Robert Mutter (December 20, 1873 – November 7, 1948) was an American farmer, businessman, and politician.

== Biography ==
Born in the town of Dover, Racine County, Wisconsin, Mutter was a farmer and owned a hotel and saloon. Mutter served as sheriff of Racine County and on the Racine County Board. In 1919, Mutter served in the Wisconsin State Assembly. He was a Republican.

Mutter died in San Benito, Texas on November 7, 1948.
