= Dover, Racine County, Wisconsin =

Town of Dover, Wisconsin
- Town
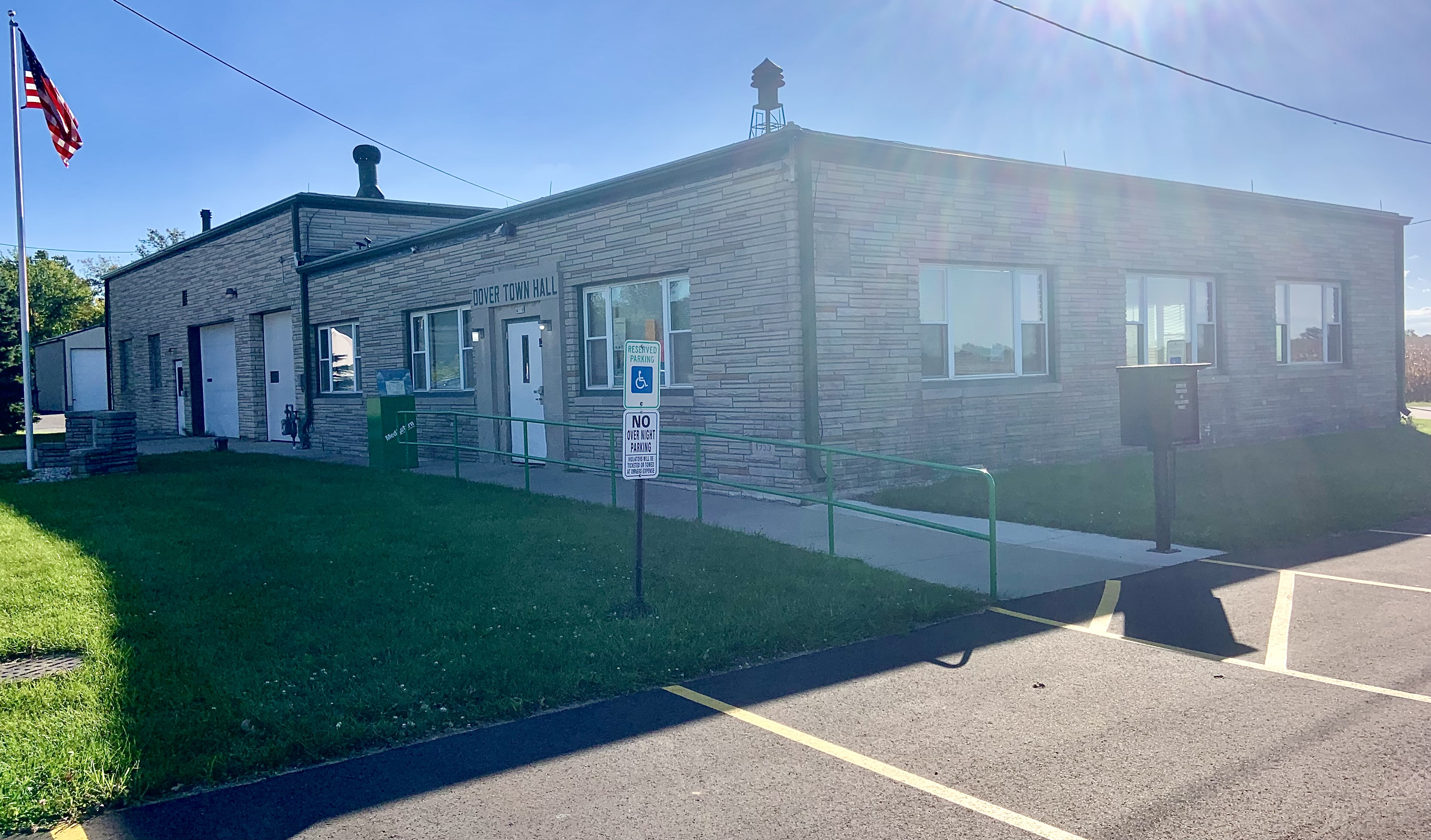
- Town hall

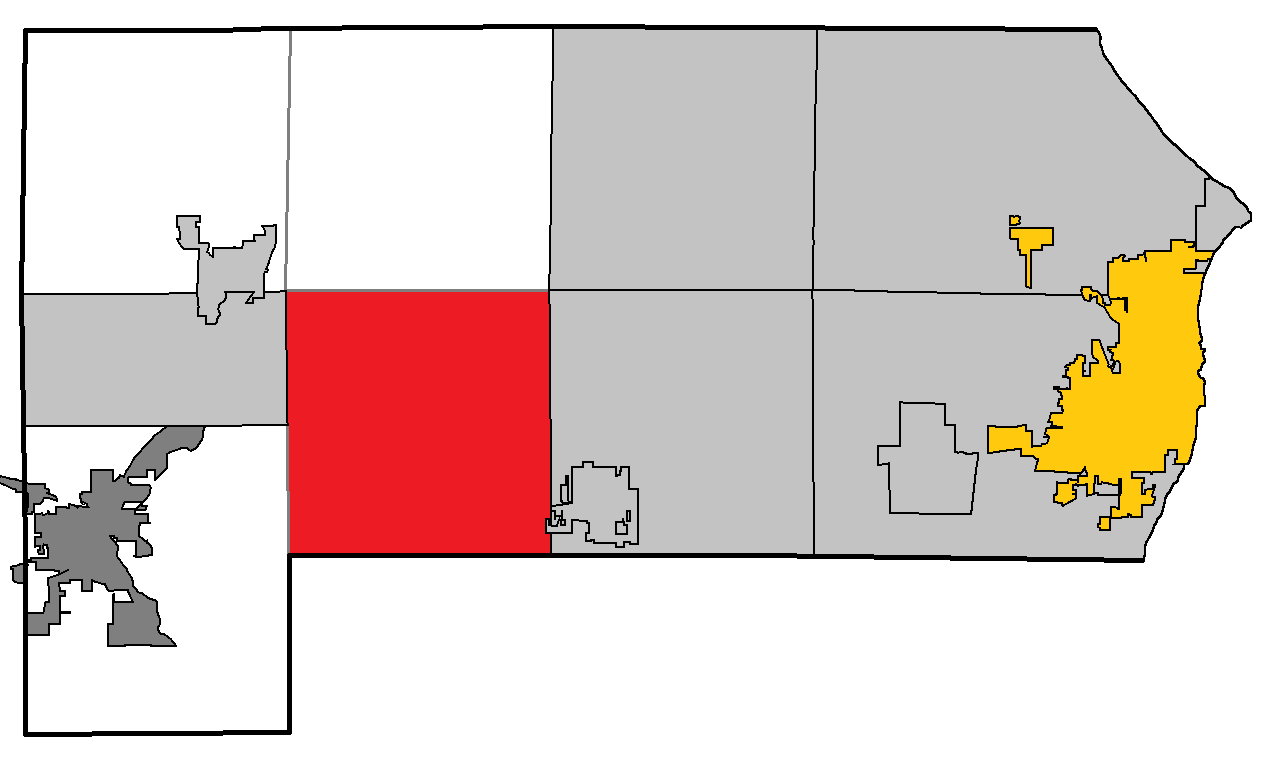
- Location of the Town of Dover, within Racine County, Wisconsin
- Coordinates: 42°42′43″N 88°7′35″W
- Country: United States
- State: Wisconsin
- County: Racine

Area
  - Total: 36.2 sq mi (93.7 km^{2})
  - Land: 35.4 sq mi (91.6 km^{2})
  - Water: 0.81 sq mi (2.1 km^{2})
- Elevation: 810 ft (247 m)

Population (2020)
  - Total: 4,282
  - Density: 111/sq mi (42.7/km^{2})
- Time zone: UTC-6 (Central (CST))
  - Summer (DST): UTC-5 (CDT)
- ZIP code: 53139
- Area code: 262
- FIPS code: 55-20625
- GNIS feature ID: 1583094
- Website: https://townofdoverwi.com/

The Town of Dover is located in Racine County, Wisconsin, United States. The population was 4,282 at the 2020 census. The unincorporated communities of Beaumont, Eagle Lake Manor, Eagle Lake Terrace, Kansasville, and Rosewood are located in the town. The census-designated place of Eagle Lake is also located in the town.

== Geography ==
According to the United States Census Bureau, the town has a total area of 36.2 square miles (93.7 km^{2}), of which 35.4 square miles (91.6 km^{2}) is land and 0.8 square mile (2.1 km^{2}) (2.27%) is water.

== Demographics ==
At the 2000 census, there were 3,908 people, 1,193 households, and 889 families in the town. The population density was 110.5 people per square mile (42.7/km^{2}). There were 1,344 housing units at an average density of 38.0 per square mile (14.7/km^{2}). The racial makeup of the town was 91.38% White, 4.71% African American, 1.07% Native American, 0.51% Asian, 0.03% Pacific Islander, 1.43% from other races, and 0.87% from two or more races. Hispanic or Latino of any race were 3.94%.

Of the 1,193 households 38.8% had children under the age of 18 living with them, 62.6% were married couples living together, 8.0% had a female householder with no husband present, and 25.4% were non-families. 18.9% of households were one person and 5.9% were one person aged 65 or older. The average household size was 2.72 and the average family size was 3.14.

The age distribution was 26.0% under the age of 18, 6.9% from 18 to 24, 35.8% from 25 to 44, 22.8% from 45 to 64, and 8.6% 65 or older. The median age was 36 years. For every 100 females, there were 90.3 males. For every 100 females age 18 and over, there were 92.9 males.

The median household income was $49,972 and the median family income was $58,176. Males had a median income of $37,209 versus $29,256 for females. The per capita income for the town was $20,275. About 2.0% of families and 11.2% of the population were below the poverty line, including 3.4% of those under age 18 and 0.7% of those age 65 or over.

== Notable people ==
- Alfred L. Buchan, Wisconsin state legislator and physician
- Robert J. Matheson, Wisconsin state legislator and businessman
- Robert Mutter, Wisconsin state legislator
- Archibald E. Spriggs, Montana politician
- John Todd Trowbridge, Wisconsin territorial legislator and sea captain
