= Abram Gordon =

19th century Wisconsin pioneer (1813–1884)

Member of the Wisconsin State Assembly from the Racine 2nd district
- In office January 5, 1852 – January 3, 1853
- Preceded by: Peter Van Vliet
- Succeeded by: William H. Roe

Personal details
- Born: March 5, 1813 Greene County, New York, U.S.
- Died: June 24, 1884 (aged 71) Waupaca County, Wisconsin, U.S.
- Resting place: Lakeside Cemetery, Waupaca, Wisconsin
- Party: Republican; Whig (before 1854)
- Spouse: Emeline Place (m. 1844–1884)
- Children: Helen Gordon^{(b. 1845; died 1846)}; Lucinda Gordon^{(b. 1847; died 1891)}; Edsil E. Gordon^{(b. 1851; died 1933)}; Alice Ann (Weed)^{(b. 1855; died 1936)}; Charlotte Edith Gordon^{(b. 1863; died 1864)}; Charles Linn Gordon^{(b. 1866; died 1934)}
- Occupation: Farmer

Abram Gordon (March 5, 1813 – June 24, 1884) was an American farmer, politician, and Wisconsin pioneer. He served one year as a member of the Wisconsin State Assembly, representing central Racine County during the 1852 term. Later he was one of the early settlers of Waupaca County, Wisconsin. During his lifetime, his name was almost always abbreviated as A. Gordon. In some historical documents, his first name is spelled "Abraham".

== Biography ==
Abram Gordon was born in Greene County, New York, in 1813. He moved to Caledonia, Wisconsin, sometime before 1850. He was elected to Wisconsin State Assembly in 1851, running on the Whig Party ticket. He represented Racine County's 2nd Assembly district, which then comprised roughly the middle third of the county.

Shortly after his term in the Legislature, Gordon was a pioneer settler in Waupaca County, Wisconsin, where he resided for much of the rest of his life. He died on June 24, 1884.

Wisconsin State Assembly
| Preceded by Peter Van Vliet | Member of the Wisconsin State Assembly from the Racine 2nd district January 5, 1852 – January 3, 1853 | Succeeded by William H. Roe |
