= Samuel C. Bean =

19th century American politician

7th State Librarian of Wisconsin
- In office July 1860 – 1863
- Appointed by: Alexander Randall
- Preceded by: Horace Rublee
- Succeeded by: O. M. Conover

Member of the Wisconsin Senate
- In office January 7, 1861 – January 5, 1863
- Preceded by: William Robert Taylor
- Succeeded by: Willard H. Chandler
- Constituency: 11th Senate district
- In office January 5, 1857 – January 3, 1859
- Preceded by: Edwin B. Kelsey
- Succeeded by: Enias D. Masters
- Constituency: 23rd Senate district

Personal details
- Born: c.1819 New Hampshire, U.S.
- Died: March 23, 1870 (aged 50–51) Freeport, Illinois, U.S.
- Cause of death: Heart disease
- Party: Republican; Free Soil (1850–1854); Democratic (before 1850)
- Spouse: Amanda Charlotte Bragg (m. 1843–1870)
- Children: at least 2

Samuel C. Bean (c.1819 – March 23, 1870) was an American farmer, Republican politician, and Wisconsin pioneer. He was a member of the Wisconsin Senate, representing Jefferson County in 1857 and 1858, and representing Dane County in 1861 and 1862. He also served as state librarian from 1860 to 1863. His name was sometimes abbreviated S. C. Bean.

== Biography ==
Samuel C. Bean was born in New Hampshire circa 1819. At some point before 1843, he relocated to Vergennes, Vermont, where he was living at the time of his marriage. Before leaving New England, Bean was involved with the Free Soil Party.

Bean moved to the state of Wisconsin in the mid-1850s, settling in Lake Mills, Jefferson County. Shortly after his arrival, he was elected to the Wisconsin Senate from the 23rd Senate district, running on the Republican Party ticket. The 23rd Senate district then comprised roughly 75% of Jefferson County. He represented Jefferson County during the 1857 and 1858 legislative sessions.

Almost immediately after his Senate term, Bean removed from Jefferson County to Dane County, where he settled in the village of Sun Prairie, near Madison. Throughout the late 1850s and early 1860s, Bean was active campaigning around the state on behalf of the Republican Party; he was also active in the Temperance movement in this era. Bean was especially active in support of the Republicans in the 1859 election, and was appointed state librarian shortly after that election. The state librarian was technically responsible for the State Library, now known as the Wisconsin State Law Library. He ultimately served three years.

Later in 1860, Bean received the Republican nomination for Wisconsin Senate in the 11th Senate district, prevailing over a number of other candidates at the Republican district convention. At the time, the district comprised roughly the eastern half of Dane County. Bean went on to win the general election, and served in the 1861 and 1862 legislative sessions.

During the Civil War, Bean briefly served as an agent of the state's Soldiers Aid Society in Kentucky and Tennessee, but resigned after only a few months on the job.

Shortly after, Bean was employed as general agent for the Madison Mutual Insurance Company. He died suddenly of heart disease while on a business trip in Freeport, Illinois, on March 23, 1870.

== Personal life and family ==
Samuel Bean married Amanda Charlotte Bragg at Warren, Vermont, on July 9, 1843. They had at least two children together. Their son Edwin S. Bean moved to Minnesota, was a sheriff of Ramsey County, Minnesota, then served as an officer in the 13th Minnesota Infantry Regiment during the Spanish–American War.

Wisconsin Senate
Preceded by Edwin B. Kelsey	Member of the Wisconsin Senate 23rd district January 5, 1857 – January 3, 1859	Succeeded by Enias D. Masters
Preceded by William Robert Taylor	Member of the Wisconsin Senate 11th district January 7, 1861 – January 5, 1863	Succeeded by Willard H. Chandler
