= Martin Garber =

American politician (1829–1903)

Member of the Iowa Senate from the 40th district
- In office January 12, 1880 – January 13, 1884
- Preceded by: John Thompson Stoneman
- Succeeded by: William Larrabee

Personal details
- Born: April 26, 1829 Augusta County, Virginia, U.S.
- Died: October 25, 1903 (aged 74) Enid, Oklahoma Territory, U.S.
- Party: Republican
- Children: Milton C. Garber
- Relatives: John Garber (brother)

Martin Garber was an American politician who served in the Iowa Senate from 1880 to 1884. He was the father of Milton C. Garber.

== Biography ==
Martin Garber was born on April 26, 1829, in Augusta County, Virginia, to Martin Garber and Magdalen Mohler. His family moved to Logan County, Ohio when he was two and then to Shelby County, Iowa. In 1856, he married Lucy A. Rife. From 1863 to 1868 he lived in California. In 1868 he moved to Clayton County, Iowa. From 1868 to 1872 he served as a deputy county auditor and from 1872 to 1880 he was elected county auditor. In 1878, he was admitted to the Iowa state bar. From January 12, 1880 to January 13, 1884, he represented the 40th district of the Iowa Senate as a member of the Republican Party. He died on October 25, 1903, in Enid, Oklahoma Territory.

He was the father of Milton C. Garber and his brother John Garber also served in Iowa Legislature.
