= John Garber (politician) =

American politician in Iowa (1818–1886)

Member of the Iowa House of Representatives
- In office January 8, 1866 – January 12, 1868
- Preceded by: William I. Gilchrist
- Succeeded by: Presley G. Bailey
- In office December 6, 1852 – December 3, 1854
- Preceded by: Eliphalet Price
- Succeeded by: Stephen Prentice Yeomans
- Constituency: 32nd district (1852-1854); 46th district (1866-1868)

Personal details
- Born: January 4, 1818 Augusta County, Virginia, U.S.
- Died: August 18, 1886 (aged 68)
- Party: Republican
- Other political affiliations: Whig (until 1854)
- Relatives: Martin Garber (brother); Milton C. Garber (nephew)

John Garber (January 4, 1818 – August 18, 1886) was an American politician.

== Personal life ==
John Garber was the eldest son of parents Martin Garber and Magdalene Mohler, born in Augusta County, Virginia, on January 4, 1818. In 1831, the Garber family moved to Bellefontaine, Ohio. John Garber married fellow Virginia native Mary C. Rife in 1840, and the couple relocated near Colesburg, Iowa, in 1846. Two years later, they moved to Elkport, where they raised six children. Garber died in Elkport on August 18, 1886.

== Political career ==
Garber won his first term on the Iowa House of Representatives as a Whig, and held the District 32 seat from 1852 to 1854. Garber was elected to a Clayton County judgeship in 1860, then elected as county sheriff in 1862. Garber returned to the state house from 1866 to 1868 as a Republican for District 46.
