= Enid News & Eagle =

Newspaper in Enid, Oklahoma

- Type: Daily newspaper
- Format: Broadsheet
- Owner(s): CNHI
- Publisher: Cindy Elliott Allen
- Editor: Cindy Elliott Allen
- Founded: September 22, 1893
- Headquarters: 227 West Broadway; Enid, Oklahoma 73702; United States
- OCLC number: 32180212
- Website: enidnews.com

The Enid News & Eagle is a daily newspaper published Tuesday through Sunday in Enid, Oklahoma, United States. The publication covers several counties in northwest Oklahoma and is owned by Community Newspaper Holdings Inc. The newspaper also provides regularly updated news coverage at enidnews.com.

Counties within (or partially within) its circulation area include Alfalfa, Blaine, Garfield, Grant, Kingfisher, Logan, Major, Noble, Woods, and Woodward. The Enid area is also home to Vance Air Force Base; the News & Eagle also produces the base's weekly newspaper.

== History ==
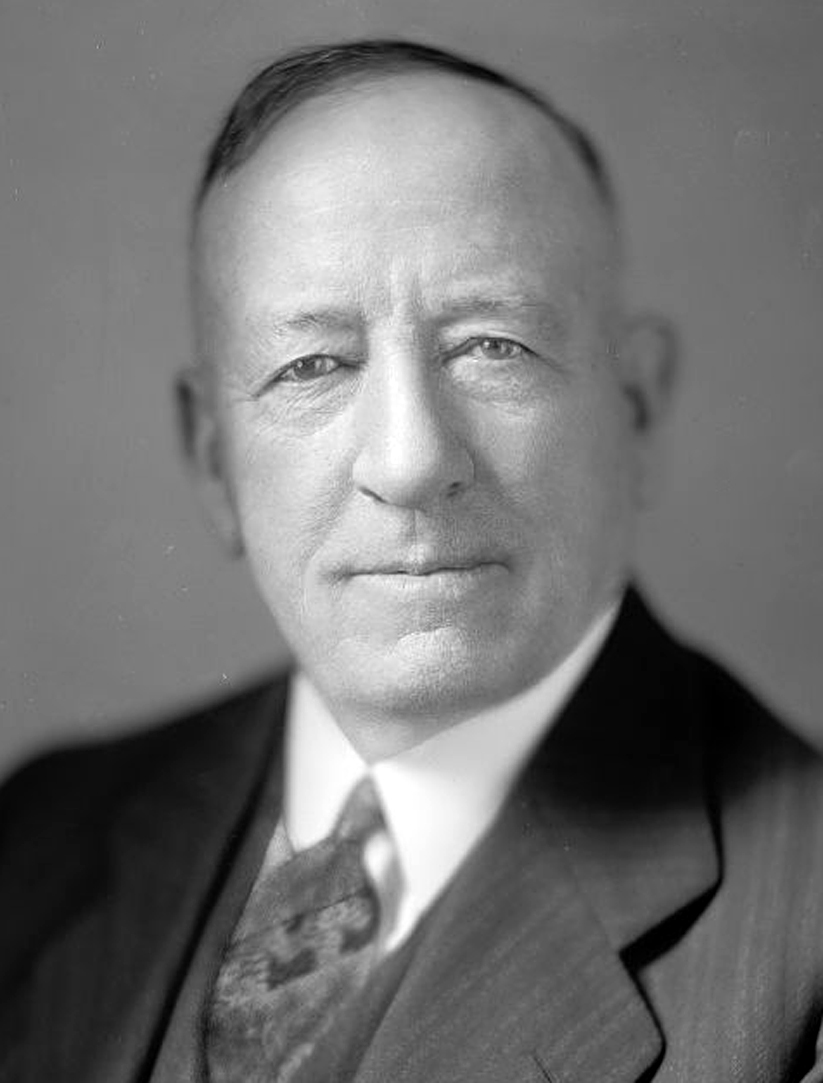
Former Enid Mayor and Oklahoma Congressman Milton C. Garber served as editor and president.

The Enid Eagle began publication on September 22, 1893. The paper was first published as the Enid Weekly Eagle by C.E. Hunter from 1893 to 1899. It was followed by the Sun Eagle by W.I. Drummond from 1899 to 1900. From 1900 to 1905, the Enid Eagle was published weekly by Eagle Publishing Company. The Enid Daily Eagle was a weekday-only newspaper by Enid Publishing Company from September 1901 – 1989, with a Saturday edition entitled the Enid News and Eagle, Dec. 12, 1987-Feb. 25, 1989. Its current incarnation has been called the Enid News & Eagle since 1989.

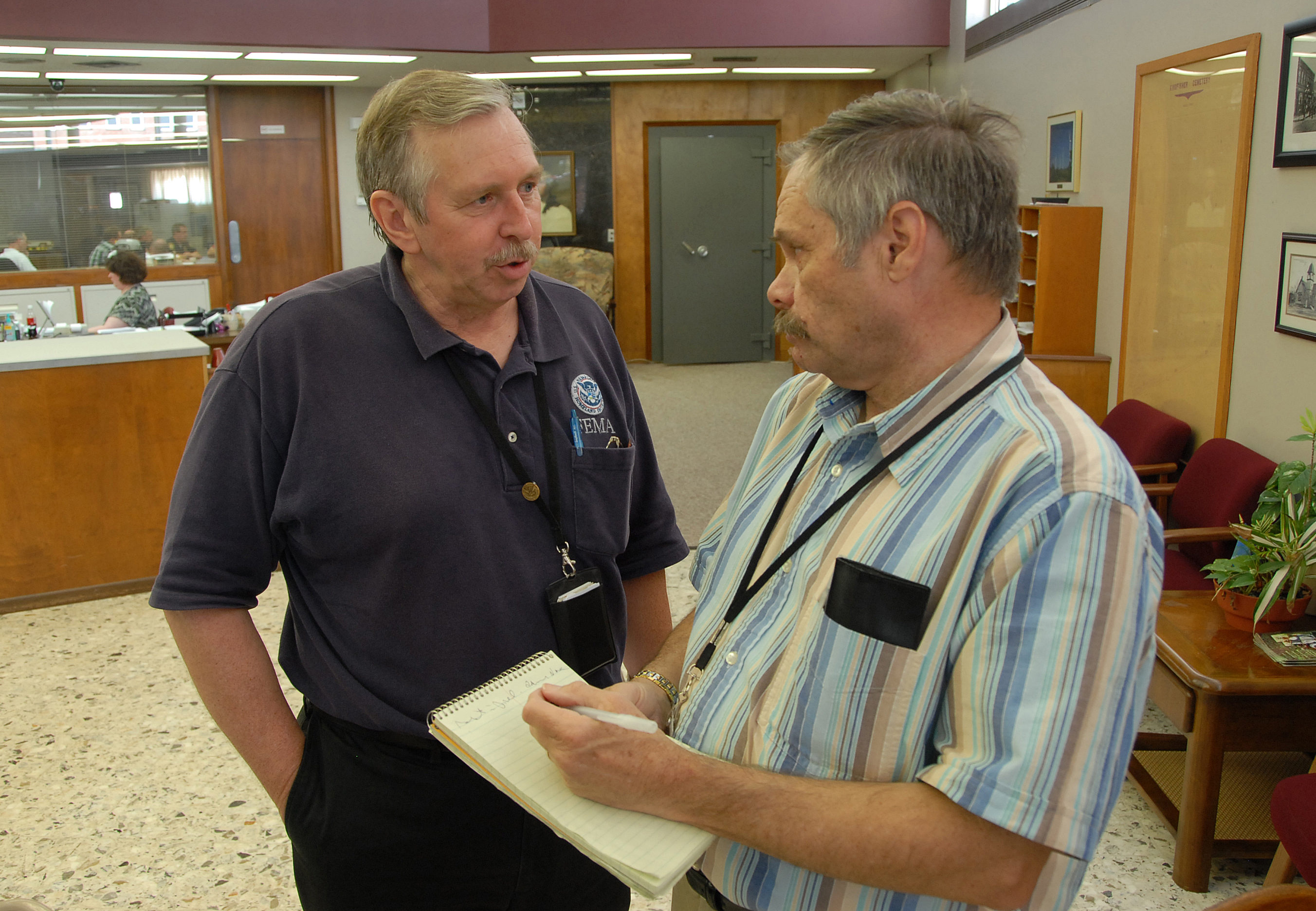
Enid News & Eagle reporter Robert Barron interviews FEMA PIO Charles Henderson following Kingfisher flooding in 2007.

The Enid Daily Wave (later the Enid Morning News) began on December 11, 1893, under the management of editor J.L. Isenberg. Isenberg had a reputation for being an opinionated Democrat and his paper reflected his opinions. This ultimately led to a showdown between Isenberg and R. W. Patterson, Registrar of the United States Land Office. Isenberg had expected preferential treatment concerning the purchases of advertisements, as they were both Democrats, but Patterson instead favored a competing newspaper at the time, the Tribune-Democrat. Isenberg then published articles denigrating Patterson. On June 26, 1895, a fight broke out between the two. E. C. Williams, City Marshal of Enid, attempted to break up the fight. Ultimately, Williams and Patterson shot each other. Isenberg fled to Kingfisher, and after a brief return to Enid, eventually moved to California. The paper continued to be published as the Enid Morning News from 1908 to 1916, the Enid Daily News from 1916 to 1923.

In February 1923, the papers were combined to form the Enid Publishing Company. Former Enid Mayor and Oklahoma Congressman Milton C. Garber served as editor and president. William M. Taylor, vice president and business manager, owned the paper along with Will and Edmund Frantz. The Taylor and Garber families were crucial to the publishing company's operation for three generations with the involvement of John W. Taylor, Steve Taylor, Milton Garber, Jr., and Todd Garber.

The Thomson Corporation acquired the News & Eagle in 1988, and sold it to Hollinger International in 1996. Hollinger sold off most of its small papers in 1999, the Enid News & Eagle went to Community Newspaper Holdings.
