= Stephen Prentice Yeomans =

American physician and politician (1822–1903)

Stephen Prentice Yeomans (January 23, 1822 – September 8, 1903) was an American physician and politician. He moved from New York to Iowa as a teenager, received his medical education in Illinois, and served in the Iowa House of Representatives and the American Indian Wars.

== Early life ==
Yeomans was born on January 23, 1822, in German Flatts, New York, raised on the family farm, and educated in public schools. In 1837, when Yeomans was fifteen, he and his family moved to Henry County in the Iowa District of Wisconsin Territory, which became Iowa Territory the following year. For the first three years of his life in Mount Pleasant, Yeomans taught school during the winter months, and did farm work in the summer. Aged 20, he began studying medicine and graduated from Rush Medical College in 1854. Yeomans immediately returned to Henry County to practice medicine, then moved to Lucas County, and served as physician of Agency City and Sheridan.

== Public service career ==
Yeomans served a single term on the Iowa House of Representatives from December 4, 1854, to November 30, 1856, holding the District 32 seat as a Democrat. At the time, the district included the counties of Clarke, Lucas, Wayne and Decatur. In 1858, James Buchanan appointed Yeomans the register of the United States General Land Office at Sioux City, where he remained for six years. During the American Civil War and American Indian Wars, Yeomans served as a Union Army assistant surgeon with the 7th Iowa Cavalry Regiment from 1863 to 1866.

Following the end of his military service, Yeomans relocated to Clinton, where he resumed the private practice of medicine. In 1871, he enrolled at the Hahnemann Medical College in Chicago, and subsequently moved to Charles City in 1879. Yeomans also served on the local branch of the Bureau of Pensions in Osage and Charles City, and was a trustee of the Iowa State Agricultural College for six years.

Yeomans died at the Soldiers’ Home in Marshalltown on September 8, 1903.
