= John Todd Trowbridge =

Wisconsin pioneer

John T. Trowbridge

Member of the House of Representatives of the Wisconsin Territory from Racine County
- In office November 7, 1842 – November 4, 1844 Serving with Philander Judson (1842–1843), Peter Van Vliet (1842–1843), Levi Grant (1843–1844), & Ezra Birchard (1843–1844)
- Preceded by: George Batchelder, Thomas E. Parmelee, & Reuben H. Deming
- Succeeded by: Robert McClellan, Orson Sheldon, & Albert G. Northway

Personal details
- Born: October 23, 1780 New Haven, Connecticut
- Died: May 3, 1858 (aged 77) Dover, Racine County, Wisconsin, U.S.
- Resting place: Rosewood Cemetery, Rosewood, Wisconsin
- Party: Democratic
- Spouse: Polly Mary Miles (died 1866)
- Children: 6

John Todd Trowbridge (October 23, 1780 – May 3, 1858) was an American sea captain, businessman, and Wisconsin pioneer. He was the first American settler at what is now the town of Dover in Racine County, Wisconsin, and represented Racine County in the Wisconsin Territory House of Representatives during the 4th Wisconsin Territorial Assembly.

== Biography ==
Born in New Haven, Connecticut, Trowbridge was a sea captain. During the War of 1812, he was captured by the British and held prisoner in Calcutta, India, and then Dartmoor Prison in England. After the war, Trowbridge was released and went to Rochester, New York, where he owned a shipping business. In 1836, Trowbridge, his wife, and family moved to Wisconsin Territory, where they settled in what is now Dover, Racine County, Wisconsin. There they built a log cabin that served as an inn. Trowbridge served as a justice of the peace. He was declared bankrupt in 1842. Trowbridge also served in the Wisconsin Territorial House of Representatives in 1843 and 1844. He ran for Racine County treasurer in 1851 as a Democrat. Trowbridge died in Dover, Wisconsin.
