= Robert J. Matheson =

American politician, musician, and businessman

Robert J. Matheson (February 16, 1907 – September 6, 1956) was an American politician, musician, and businessman.

Born in the Town of Dover, Racine County, Wisconsin, Matheson graduated from the Racine County School of Agriculture. He worked as a manager of a commercial department in a law firm and then operated a wholesale tobacco/vending machine business. Matheson also was a drummer in a dance orchestra and was involved in a local musicians union. Matheson worked in the Racine County Sheriff Department and served as sheriff. He was a Republican. Matheson served in the Wisconsin State Assembly from 1951 to 1955, failing to retain his seat in the 1954 election. He was killed in an automobile accident, when he fell asleep and hit a tree while driving home in Racine, Wisconsin.
