= Joseph Dorr Clapp =

19th century banker and politician

J. D. Clapp
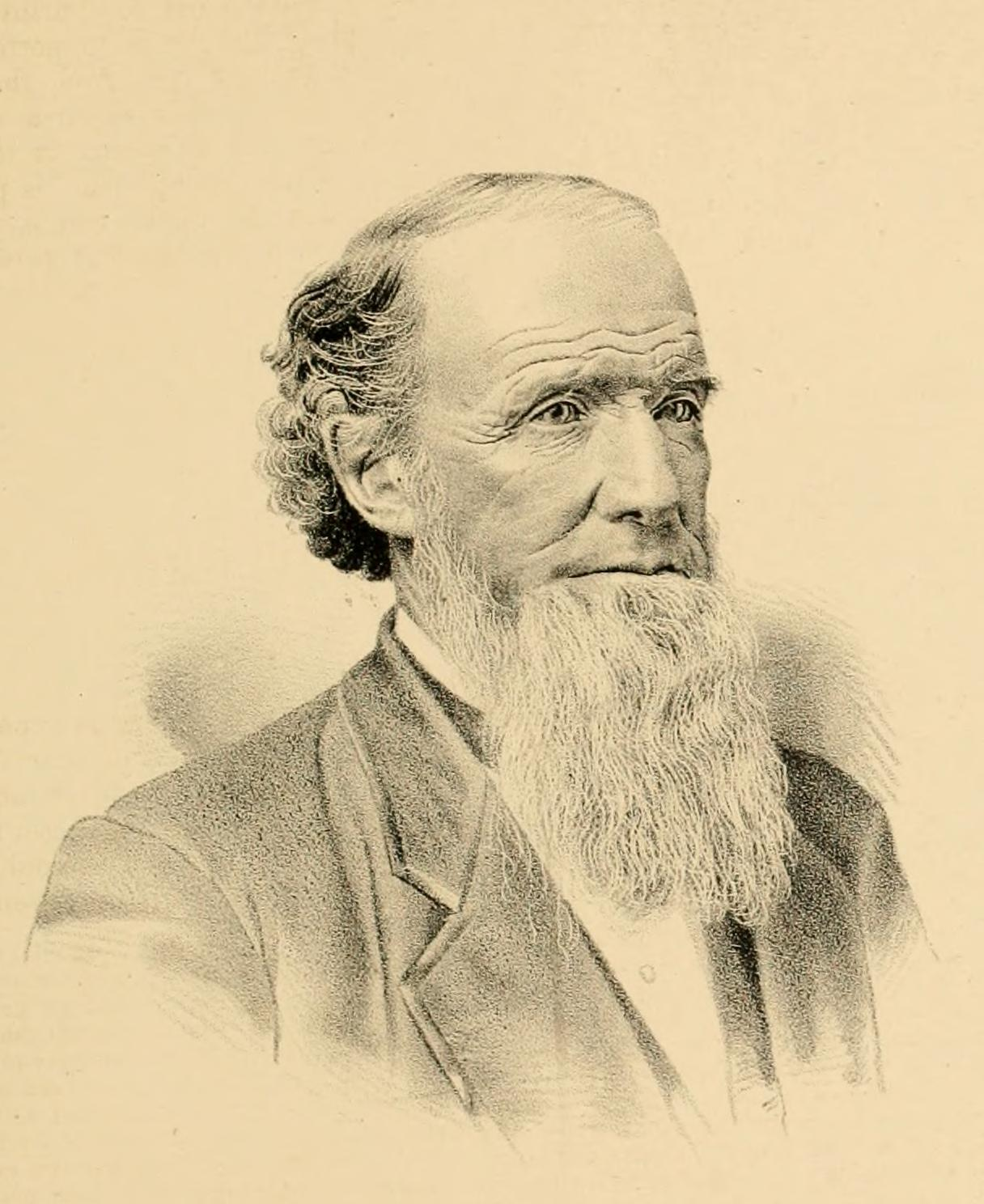
- Portrait from The History of Jefferson County, Wisconsin (1879)

Member of the Wisconsin Senate from the 23rd district
- In office January 5, 1863 – January 2, 1865
- Preceded by: Edwin Montgomery
- Succeeded by: S. W. Budlong

Personal details
- Born: December 31, 1811 Westminster, Vermont, U.S.
- Died: October 27, 1900 (aged 88) Fort Atkinson, Wisconsin, U.S.
- Resting place: Lakeview Cemetery, Fort Atkinson
- Party: Democratic
- Spouses: Zida Ann May (died 1868); Samaria C. Clapp (died 1919)
- Children: Ida May (Scott); (b. 1855; died 1903)
- Relatives: Mark R. Clapp (brother)
- Occupation: banker

Joseph Dorr Clapp (December 31, 1811 – October 27, 1900) was an American banker, Democratic politician, and Wisconsin pioneer. He served two years in the Wisconsin State Senate, representing Jefferson County. In contemporaneous documents he was frequently referred to as J. D. Clapp.

== Biography ==
J. D. Clapp was born in Westminster, Vermont, on New Year's Eve 1811. He moved to Milford, Wisconsin Territory, in 1839 and was a farmer.

In 1859, he started the Koshkonong Bank in partnership with Lucien B. Caswell. The bank later merged into the First National Bank, and Clapp served as president of the merged bank until his death in 1900. He served in the Wisconsin State Senate for the 1862 and 1863 sessions. His brother was Mark R. Clapp who served in the Wisconsin Territorial Legislature.

Clapp died in Fort Atkinson, Wisconsin.

Wisconsin Senate
Preceded by Edwin Montgomery	Member of the Wisconsin Senate from the 23rd district January 5, 1863 – January 2, 1865	Succeeded by S. W. Budlong
