= Mark R. Clapp =

American politician

Mark Clapp

Member of the Wisconsin Territorial House of Representatives
- In office 1946

Personal details
- Born: Mark Richards Clapp; March 3, 1803; Boston, Massachusetts, U.S.
- Died: April 23, 1891 (aged 88)
- Relations: Joseph Dorr Clapp (brother)

Mark Richards Clapp (March 3, 1803 – April 23, 1891) was an American farmer and territorial legislator.

== Background ==
Born in Boston, Massachusetts, Clapp settled in Milford, Wisconsin Territory, in 1840. Clapp was a farmer. In 1846, he served in the Wisconsin Territorial House of Representatives. His brother was Joseph Dorr Clapp who served in the Wisconsin Senate.
