= Theophilus F. Metcalf =

American politician

Theophilus Frank Metcalf (May 10, 1816 – February 13, 1891) was an American farmer and politician.

Metcalf was born in Wicklow, Ireland and then emigrated to the United States. He settled in Winnebago County, Wisconsin in 1849 and then moved to the town of Marion in Waushara County, Wisconsin where he was a farmer. Metcalf served as chairman of the Marion Town Board. In 1870, Metcalf served in the Wisconsin Assembly and was elected as an Independent against Charles H. Stowers, the Republican nominee. Metcalf would sit in the Wisconsin Assembly as a Republican. Metcalf died suddenly in Berlin, Wisconsin.
