= Andrew B. Jackson =

American politician

Andrew B. Jackson (February 14, 1814 – March 25, 1878) was an American pioneer and territorial legislator.

Born in Wolcott, Connecticut, he settled in Racine County, Wisconsin Territory. While living in Racine County, Jackson served in the Wisconsin Territorial Legislature, in the Wisconsin Territorial House of Representatives in 1846, and then served in the second Wisconsin Constitutional Convention of 1847–1848. In 1861, he moved to Menasha, Wisconsin, where he was the register of the land office. In 1869, he moved to Evanston, Illinois and then to Rogers Park, Chicago, where he died of pneumonia. Jackson was a member of the Democratic Party and then became a Republican when Abraham Lincoln became President in 1861.
