= Roger Halvorson =

American politician and businessperson

Roger Halvorson (February 12, 1934 – November 2, 2014) was an American politician and businessman.

Born in Waterville, Iowa, Halvorson served in the Iowa National Guard. He received his bachelor's degree from Upper Iowa University. He was a teacher, real estate developer, and in the insurance business. Halvorson served in the Iowa House of Representatives from 1975 to 1997 as a Republican. He died in Marquette, Iowa.
