= Leigh Rekow =

American politician

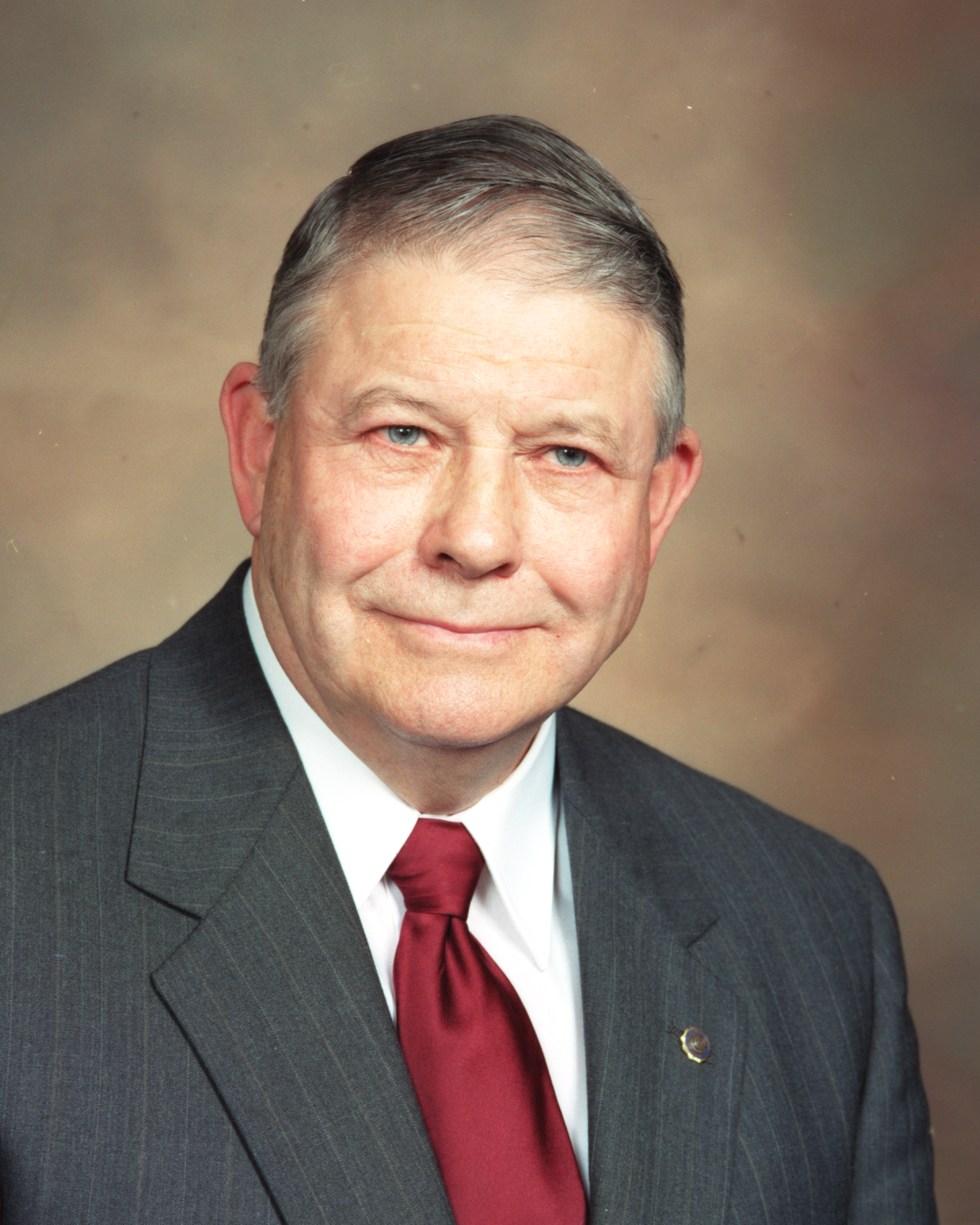

Member of the Iowa House of Representatives from the 32nd district
- In office January 8, 2001 – January 12, 2003

Personal details
- Born: Leigh Allen Rekow; June 26, 1934 (age 92) Iowa, United States
- Party: Republican
- Spouse: Gwen Rekow
- Children: 4
- Profession: Farmer

Leigh Allen Rekow (born June 26, 1934) is an American politician in the state of Iowa.

Rekow was born in the Luana/Postville, Iowa area and is a farmer. As a Republican, he served in the Iowa House of Representatives from 2001 to 2003 (32nd district).
