= Beaver dam (disambiguation) =

A beaver dam is a structure built by beavers.

Beaver Dam or Beaverdam may also refer to:

== Places ==
=== Canada ===
- Beaverdam, Alberta
- Beaver Dam, New Brunswick
- Beaver Dam, Nova Scotia

=== United States ===
- Beaver Dam, Arizona
- Beaver Dam, a dam on Beaver Lake, Arkansas
- Beaver Dam, Indiana
- Beaver Dam, Kentucky
- Beaver Dam (Maryland), flooded marble quarry
- Beaverdam, Missouri
- Beaver Dam Township, Butler County, Missouri
- Beaverdam, Nevada
- Beaver Dams, New York
- Beaver Dam Township, Cumberland County, North Carolina
- Beaver Dam (Knightdale, North Carolina), a historic plantation house
- Beaverdam, Ohio
- Beaver Dam, Texas
- Beaver Dam, Utah
- Beaverdam, Virginia
- Beaver Dam, Wisconsin
  - Beaver Dam (town), Wisconsin
  - South Beaver Dam, Wisconsin, an unincorporated community
- Beaver Dam Lake (Wisconsin)
- Beaver Dam Mountains Wilderness, in Arizona and Utah
- Beaver Dam River, in Wisconsin

== Battles ==
- Battle of Beaver Dam Creek, in the American Civil War, 1862
- Battle of Beaver Dams, in the War of 1812

== See also ==
- Beaverdam Creek (disambiguation)
- Beaver Dam Lake (disambiguation)
- Beaver Dam State Park (disambiguation)
