= Parker Warren =

American farmer and politician (1802–1887)

Parker Warren (March 16, 1802 – July 11, 1887) was an American farmer from Beaver Dam, Wisconsin who served a one-year term in 1849 as a Free Soil Party member of the Wisconsin State Assembly from Dodge County.

== Background ==
Warren was born in Massachusetts in 1802. Warren was one of the founders of the Beaver Dam Academy, now Wayland Academy, an academy chartered by the legislature of Wisconsin Territory in 1847.

When a meeting was held in Beaver Dam on February 5, 1848 to consider building a plank road from that town to Milwaukee, Warren was elected vice-president of the meeting (which resolved to pursue the project).

== Legislative service ==
Warren was elected in November 1848 for the second (1849) session of the Wisconsin Legislature after statehood, to represent the 5th Dodge County Assembly district (the Towns of Fox Lake, Trenton, Westford, Calamus and Beaver Dam), succeeding Democrat Lorenzo Merrill.

He was succeeded in the 1850 session by Malcolm Sellers, a Whig. He was the Free Soil nominee in 1852 for the same seat, but was defeated by Democrat Edwin Hillyer.

== Agriculture and civic life ==
In March 1849, when the Wisconsin State Agricultural Society was organized, Wells was appointed as a member of the committee which drafted a plan of organization for that body; but is not recorded as among those who became actual members of the society by the payment of an initiation fee. He also served as vice president of the Sabbath School Society in Beaver Dam in 1849.

In 1852, he was one of the judges for the prize for "Best tilled farm in Dodge co. without reference as to size" at a Jefferson and Dodge County agricultural fair.

He was the leading figure in a group of Dodge County farm mortgagors who petitioned the Legislature for debt relief in 1859. He was also the leading figure in a group of sixteen who petitioned the legislature in 1865 that railroad directors should be required to reside and transact business within the state.

Warren and his wife Clara later relocated to Augusta, Wisconsin, where he died in 1887.
