= Lorenzo Merrill =

American teacher, farmer, merchant, and politician from Burnett, Wisconsin

Lorenzo Merrill (June 21, 1818 - August 15, 1895) was an American teacher, farmer, merchant, and politician from Burnett, Wisconsin who served two one-year terms in the Wisconsin State Assembly.

He served in the 1st Wisconsin Legislature (1848) as a Democratic member representing the 5th Dodge County Assembly district (the Towns of Fox Lake, Trenton, Calamus and Beaver Dam). He was succeeded the next year by Parker Warren, a Freesoiler. He was elected again in 1859 from the 5th district, this time as a Republican.

Although as late as 1876 he was still active as a Republican, in later years he became active in the Greenback Party, and was nominated by that movement for several positions, including Wisconsin Senate, District 11, Congressman, and state insurance commissioner.

His son, George F. Merrill, served as a Republican member of the State Senate from the same district for which his father had been a candidate.
