= Beaver Dam Lake =

Beaver Dam Lake may refer to:

== Lakes ==
- Beaver Dam Lake (Nova Scotia), Canada
- Beaver Dam Lake (Wisconsin), U.S.
- Beaver Dam Lake, in Beaver Dam State Park (Illinois), U.S

== Places ==
- Beaver Dam Lake, New York

== See also ==
- Beaver dam (disambiguation)
- Beaver Lake Dam, in Alaska, U.S.
- Beaver Lake (Arkansas)#Beaver Dam, U.S.
