= Beaver Dam Township =

Beaver Dam Township may refer to:

- Beaver Dam Township, Butler County, Missouri
- Beaver Dam Township, Cumberland County, North Carolina
