= Joseph Biel =

American farmer and politician from Wisconsin (1859–1944)

Joseph Biel (February 22, 1859 – April 18, 1944) was an American politician, farmer, and businessman. He was a member of the Wisconsin State Assembly.

Born in the Kingdom of Bavaria, Biel emigrated with his parents to the United States in 1861 and settled in Dodge County, Wisconsin. He went to public school. Biel had a farm in the town of Westford, in Dodge County. He was also involved with the Westford Mutual Fire Insurance Company. Biel served as chairman of the Westford Town Board. He also served on the school board. In 1915, Biel served in the Wisconsin State Assembly and was a Democrat. Biel died in a hospital in Beaver Dam, Wisconsin.
