= Rolling Prairie =

Rolling Prairie can refer to:

- Rolling Prairie, Indiana
- Rolling Prairie, Wisconsin
