= East Waupun, Wisconsin =

- Unincorporated community
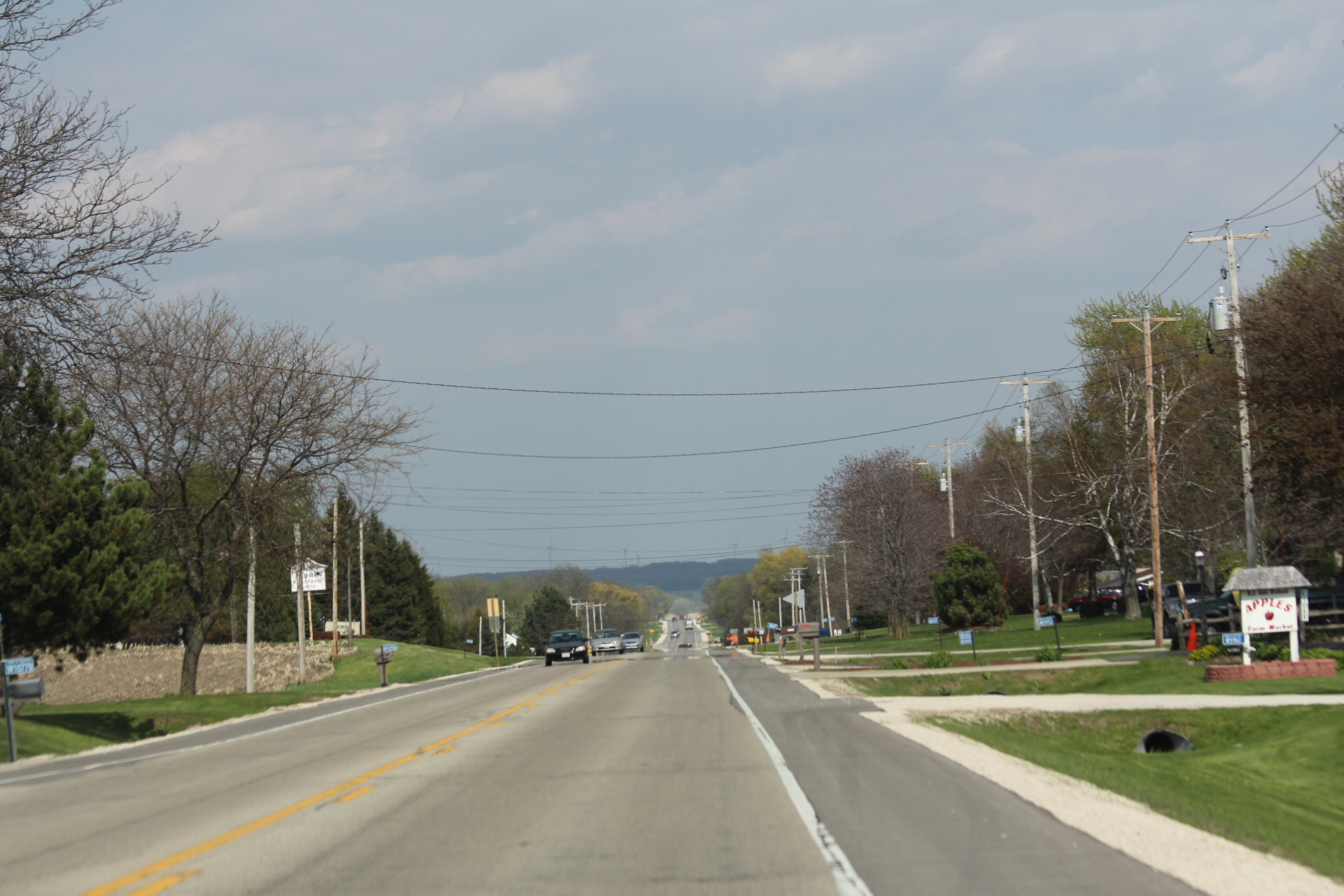
- Looking east in East Waupun on Wisconsin Highway 49

- Location within Wisconsin Location within the United States
- Coordinates: 43°37′27″N 88°41′26″W
- Country: United States
- State: Wisconsin
- County: Dodge
- Town: Chester
- Elevation: 883 ft (269 m)
- Time zone: UTC-6 (Central (CST))
  - Summer (DST): UTC-5 (CDT)
- Area code: 920
- GNIS feature ID: 1577583

East Waupun is an unincorporated community located in the town of Chester, Dodge County, Wisconsin, United States. It is located approximately one mile (2 km) east of Waupun on Wisconsin Highway 49.
