= Oak Grove, Dodge County, Wisconsin =

Oak Grove, Wisconsin
- Town
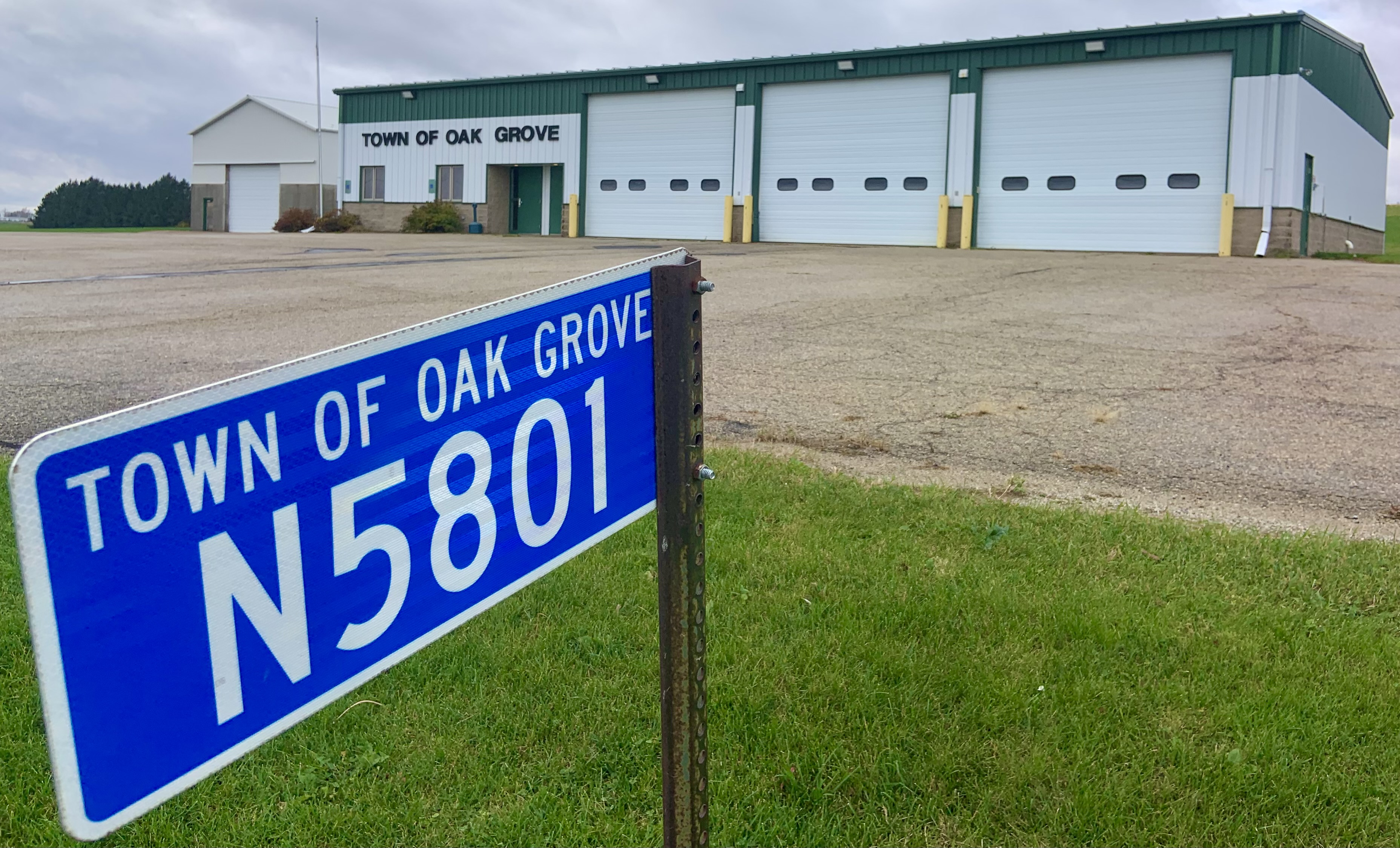
- Town hall

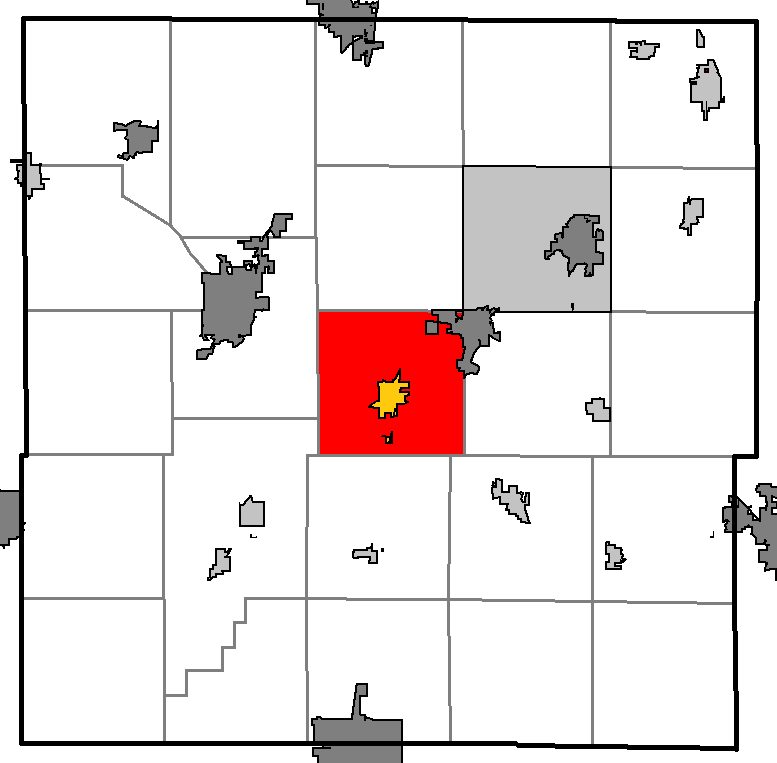
- Location of Oak Grove, within Dodge County, Wisconsin
- Coordinates: 43°26′7″N 88°41′59″W
- Country: United States
- State: Wisconsin
- County: Dodge

Area
  - Total: 34.2 sq mi (88.6 km^{2})
  - Land: 34.1 sq mi (88.3 km^{2})
  - Water: 0.12 sq mi (0.3 km^{2})
- Elevation: 935 ft (285 m)

Population (2020)
  - Total: 1,028
  - Density: 30.2/sq mi (11.6/km^{2})
- Time zone: UTC-6 (Central (CST))
  - Summer (DST): UTC-5 (CDT)
- Area code: 920
- FIPS code: 55-59000
- GNIS feature ID: 1583841

Oak Grove (originally called Fairfield) is a town in Dodge County, Wisconsin, United States. The population was 1,028 at the 2020 census. The unincorporated community of Minnesota Junction is located in the town. The unincorporated community of Rolling Prairie is also located partially in the town.

== Geography ==
According to the United States Census Bureau, the town has a total area of 34.2 square miles (88.6 km^{2}), of which 34.1 square miles (88.3 km^{2}) is land and 0.1 square mile (0.3 km^{2}) (0.32%) is water.

== Demographics ==
As of the census of 2000, there were 1,126 people, 428 households, and 335 families living in the town. The population density was 33.0 people per square mile (12.8/km^{2}). There were 448 housing units at an average density of 13.1 per square mile (5.1/km^{2}). The racial makeup of the town was 98.13% White, 0.36% African American, 0.44% Asian, 0.53% from other races, and 0.53% from two or more races. Hispanic or Latino of any race were 1.60% of the population.

There were 428 households, out of which 31.5% had children under the age of 18 living with them, 69.6% were married couples living together, 4.2% had a female householder with no husband present, and 21.7% were non-families. 18.0% of all households were made up of individuals, and 7.2% had someone living alone who was 65 years of age or older. The average household size was 2.63 and the average family size was 2.98.

In the town, the population was spread out, with 24.8% under the age of 18, 6.8% from 18 to 24, 29.3% from 25 to 44, 26.3% from 45 to 64, and 12.8% who were 65 years of age or older. The median age was 39 years. For every 100 females, there were 107.7 males. For every 100 females age 18 and over, there were 110.2 males.

The median income for a household in the town was $53,068, and the median income for a family was $58,333. Males had a median income of $36,793 versus $23,654 for females. The per capita income for the town was $20,277. About 5.4% of families and 7.4% of the population were below the poverty line, including 11.3% of those under age 18 and 13.5% of those age 65 or over.
