= Lyndon Dale, Wisconsin =

- Unincorporated community
- Location within Wisconsin Location within the United States
- Coordinates: 43°34′38″N 88°55′50″W
- Country: United States
- State: Wisconsin
- County: Dodge
- Town: Fox Lake
- Elevation: 902 ft (275 m)
- Time zone: UTC-6 (Central (CST))
  - Summer (DST): UTC-5 (CDT)
- Area code: 920
- GNIS feature ID: 1568843

Lyndon Dale is an unincorporated community located in the town of Fox Lake, Dodge County, Wisconsin, United States. The community is found on a peninsula in Fox Lake.
