= Beaver Dam State Park =

Beaver Dam State Park may refer to:

- Beaver Dam State Park (Illinois), U.S.
- Beaver Dam State Park (Nevada), U.S.
- Beaver Dam State Forest, a New York State Forest, U.S.

== See also ==
- Beaver Creek State Park, Ohio, U.S.
- Beaver Lake State Park (North Dakota)
