= Lost Lake, Wisconsin =

- Unincorporated community
- Location within Wisconsin Location within the United States
- Coordinates: 43°27′32″N 88°59′20″W
- Country: United States
- State: Wisconsin
- County: Dodge
- Towns: Calamus, Westford
- Elevation: 928 ft (283 m)
- Time zone: UTC-6 (Central (CST))
  - Summer (DST): UTC-5 (CDT)
- Area code: 920
- GNIS feature ID: 1577709

Lost Lake is an unincorporated community in the towns of Calamus and Westford, Dodge County, Wisconsin, United States.
