= George F. Merrill =

American politician

George Fisk Merrill (February 17, 1847 – January 31, 1941) was a member of the Wisconsin State Senate.

== Biography ==
Merrill was born on February 17, 1847, in Burnett, Wisconsin, son of Lorenzo Merrill and Mary Ann (Fisk) Merrill. His father was twice elected to the Wisconsin State Assembly while George was a boy; once as a Democrat in 1848, and again in 1858 as a Republican. George attended Beaver Dam Academy in Beaver Dam, Wisconsin, before attending the University of Wisconsin. Later, he moved to De Pere, Wisconsin. On October 4, 1875, Merrill married Ellen Byrne. They had four children. He died on January 31, 1941.

== Career ==
Merrill was elected to the Senate in 1886, representing the 11th district. He was a member of the Senate until 1889. In addition, Merrill was a member of the Ashland, Wisconsin School Board and served as the Ashland County district attorney from 1917 to 1926. He was a Republican.
