= Beaver Edge, Wisconsin =

- Unincorporated community
- Location within Wisconsin Location within the United States
- Coordinates: 43°29′05″N 88°50′05″W
- Country: United States
- State: Wisconsin
- County: Dodge
- Town: Beaver Dam
- Elevation: 892 ft (272 m)
- Time zone: UTC-6 (Central (CST))
  - Summer (DST): UTC-5 (CDT)
- Area code: 920
- GNIS feature ID: 1850634

Beaver Edge is an unincorporated community in the town of Beaver Dam, Dodge County, Wisconsin, United States. The community lies on the eastern shore of Beaver Dam Lake.
