= Delbern Acres, Wisconsin =

- Unincorporated community
- Location within Wisconsin Location within the United States
- Coordinates: 43°36′01″N 88°54′50″W
- Country: United States
- State: Wisconsin
- County: Dodge County
- Elevation: 896 ft (273 m)
- Time zone: UTC-6 (Central (CST))
  - Summer (DST): UTC-5 (CDT)
- Area code: 920
- GNIS feature ID: 1850663

Delbern Acres is an unincorporated community located in the town of Fox Lake, Dodge County, Wisconsin, United States. The community is located on the north shore of Fox Lake.
