= Chester, Wisconsin =

- Town
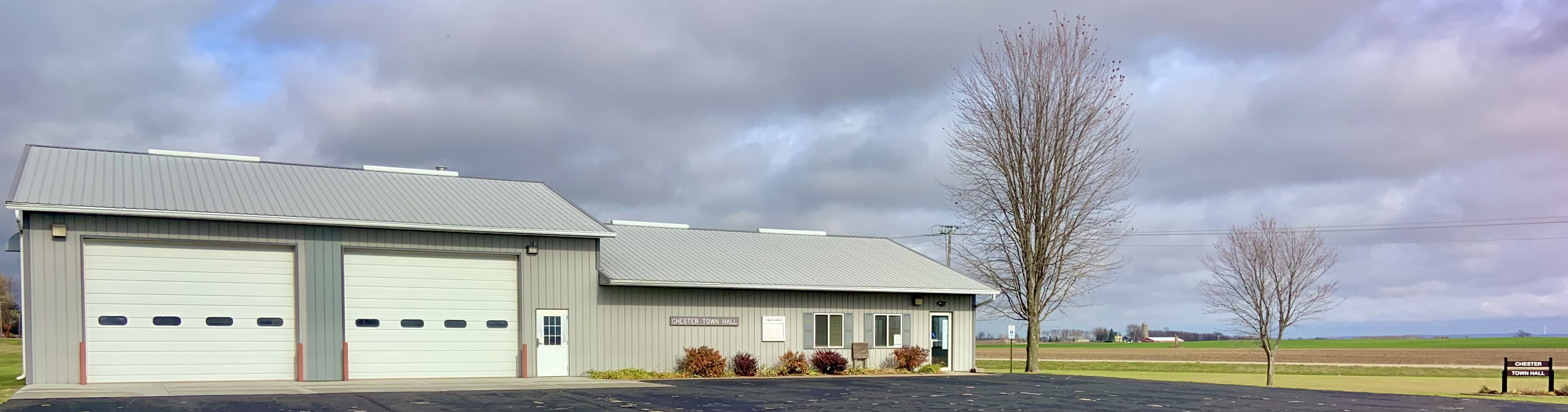
- Town hall

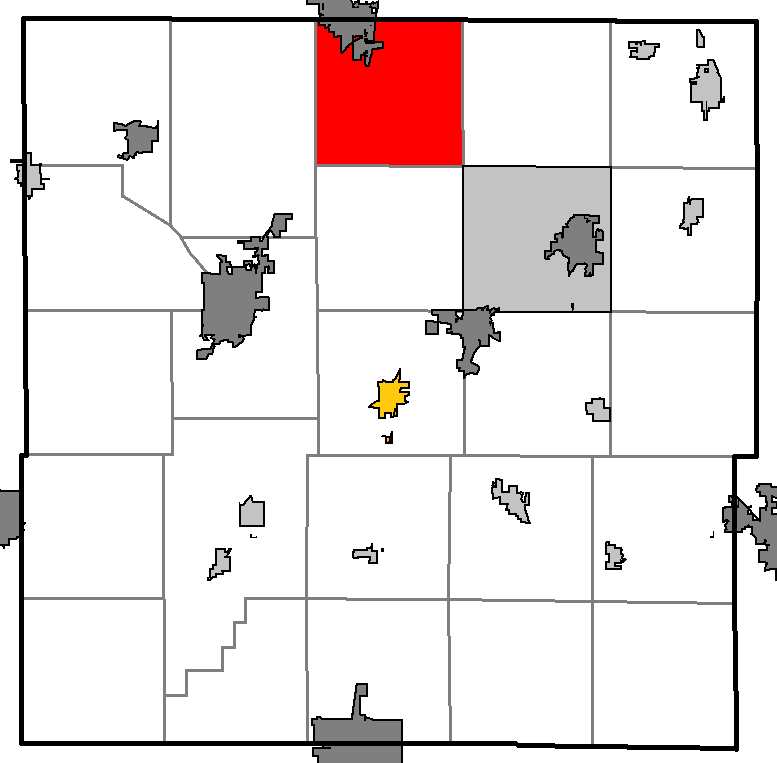
- Location of Chester, within Dodge County
- Coordinates: 43°36′18″N 88°43′24″W
- Country: United States
- State: Wisconsin
- County: Dodge

Area
  - Total: 34.4 sq mi (89.1 km^{2})
  - Land: 33.2 sq mi (86.0 km^{2})
  - Water: 1.2 sq mi (3.2 km^{2})
- Elevation: 890 ft (270 m)

Population (2020)
  - Total: 895
  - Density: 27.0/sq mi (10.4/km^{2})
- Time zone: UTC-6 (Central (CST))
  - Summer (DST): UTC-5 (CDT)
- FIPS code: 55-14300
- GNIS feature ID: 1582950

Chester is a town in Dodge County, Wisconsin, United States. The population was 895 at the 2020 census. The unincorporated communities of Atwater and East Waupun are located in the town.

== History ==
A post office called Chester was established in 1847, and remained in operation until it was discontinued in 1918. The town was named after Chester, Massachusetts.

== Geography ==
According to the United States Census Bureau, the town has a total area of 34.4 square miles (89.1 km^{2}), of which 33.2 square miles (86.0 km^{2}) is land and 1.2 square miles (3.2 km^{2}) (3.54%) is water.

== Demographics ==
As of the census of 2000, there were 960 people, 280 households, and 211 families living in the town. The population density was 28.9 people per square mile (11.2/km^{2}). There were 291 housing units at an average density of 8.8 per square mile (3.4/km^{2}). The racial makeup of the town was 87.92% White, 9.38% African American, 1.04% Native American, 0.10% Asian, 0.62% from other races, and 0.94% from two or more races. Hispanic or Latino of any race were 3.54% of the population.

There were 280 households, out of which 36.1% had children under the age of 18 living with them, 67.9% were married couples living together, 4.3% had a female householder with no husband present, and 24.6% were non-families. 21.4% of all households were made up of individuals, and 9.6% had someone living alone who was 65 years of age or older. The average household size was 2.62 and the average family size was 3.08.

In the town, the population was spread out, with 20.3% under the age of 18, 11.1% from 18 to 24, 40.1% from 25 to 44, 18.1% from 45 to 64, and 10.3% who were 65 years of age or older. The median age was 35 years. For every 100 females, there were 171.2 males. For every 100 females age 18 and over, there were 198.8 males.

The median income for a household in the town was $49,688, and the median income for a family was $55,125. Males had a median income of $32,188 versus $28,750 for females. The per capita income for the town was $20,915. About 3.3% of families and 3.0% of the population were below the poverty line, including 4.4% of those under age 18 and none of those age 65 or over.

== Notable people ==
- Darius L. Bancroft, politician, lived in Chester
- James Giddings, politician
- Frank Glazer, pianist, composer, and professor of music, was born in Chester in 1915
