= Atwater, Wisconsin =

- Unincorporated community
- Location within Wisconsin Location within the United States
- Coordinates: 43°33′39″N 88°44′04″W
- Country: United States
- State: Wisconsin
- County: Dodge
- Town: Chester
- Elevation: 932 ft (284 m)
- Time zone: UTC-6 (Central (CST))
  - Summer (DST): UTC-5 (CDT)
- Area code: 920
- GNIS feature ID: 1577499

Atwater is an unincorporated community located in the town of Chester, Dodge County, Wisconsin, United States. It was named Mill Creek until a settler from Atwater, Ohio changed the name to Atwater in 1856.
