= Harley Sanford Jones =

United States Air Force general

- Born: November 10, 1902; New Haven, Connecticut
- Died: December 28, 1997 (aged 95); Fox Lake, Wisconsin
- Military career
- Allegiance: United States of America
- Branch: United States Air Force
- Rank: Brigadier general

Harley Sanford Jones (November 10, 1902 – December 28, 1997) was a brigadier general in the United States Air Force.

== Biography ==
Jones was born in Fox Lake, Wisconsin, in 1902 and attended Ripon College. He died on December 28, 1997.

== Career ==
Jones originally joined the United States Army Reserve in 1940 before transferring to the Air Corps. During World War II Jones served with the Far East Air Force. Following the war he was assigned to Air Force Materiel Command. In 1951 he was named Chairman of the Boeing B-47 Stratojet Production Committee. His retirement was effective as of June 1, 1957.
