= Minnesota Junction, Wisconsin =

- Unincorporated community
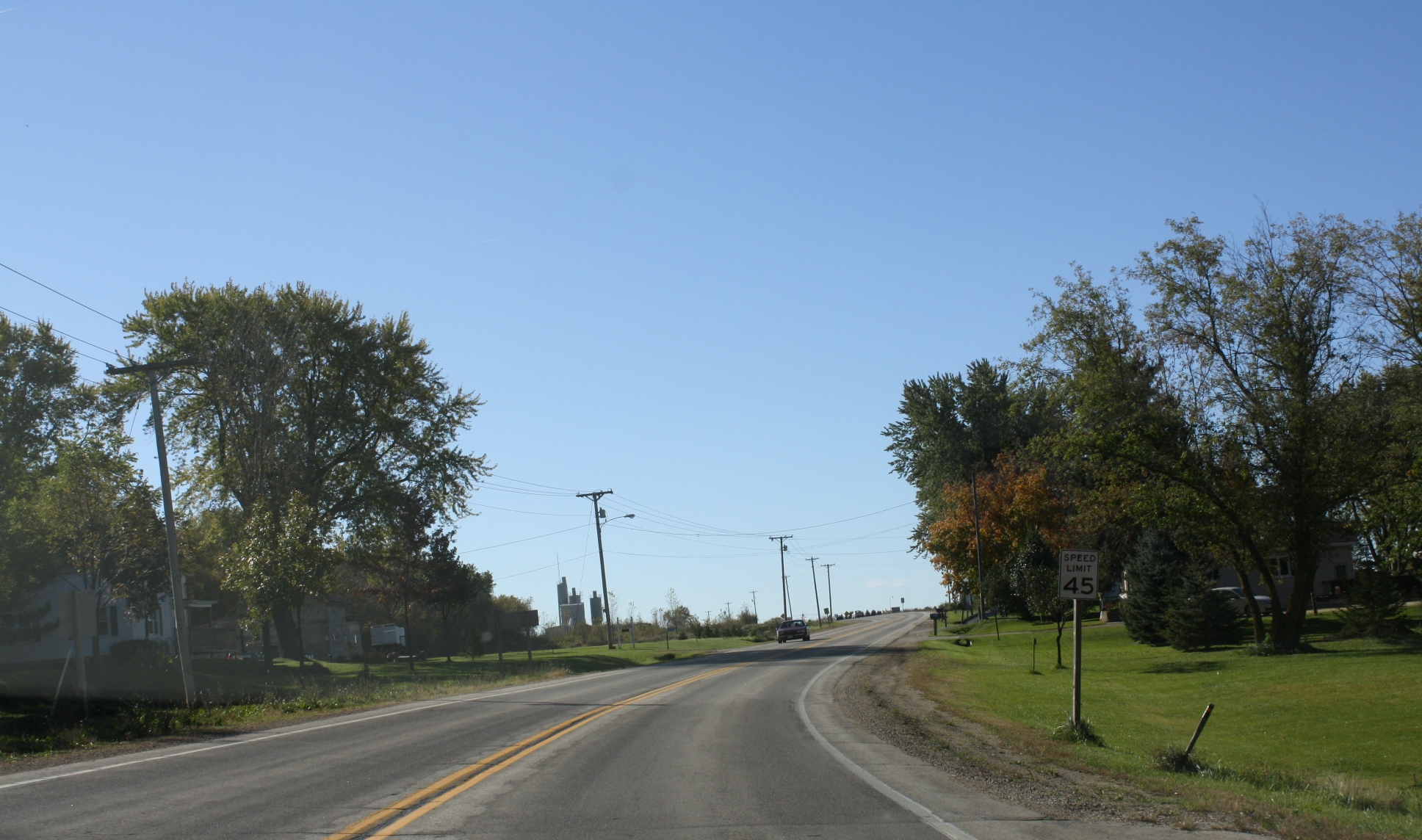
- Looking south in Minnesota Junction on WIS 26

- Location within Wisconsin Location within the United States
- Coordinates: 43°27′09″N 88°41′49″W
- Country: United States
- State: Wisconsin
- County: Dodge
- Town: Oak Grove
- Elevation: 925 ft (282 m)
- Time zone: UTC-6 (Central (CST))
  - Summer (DST): UTC-5 (CDT)
- Area code: 920
- GNIS feature ID: 1569566

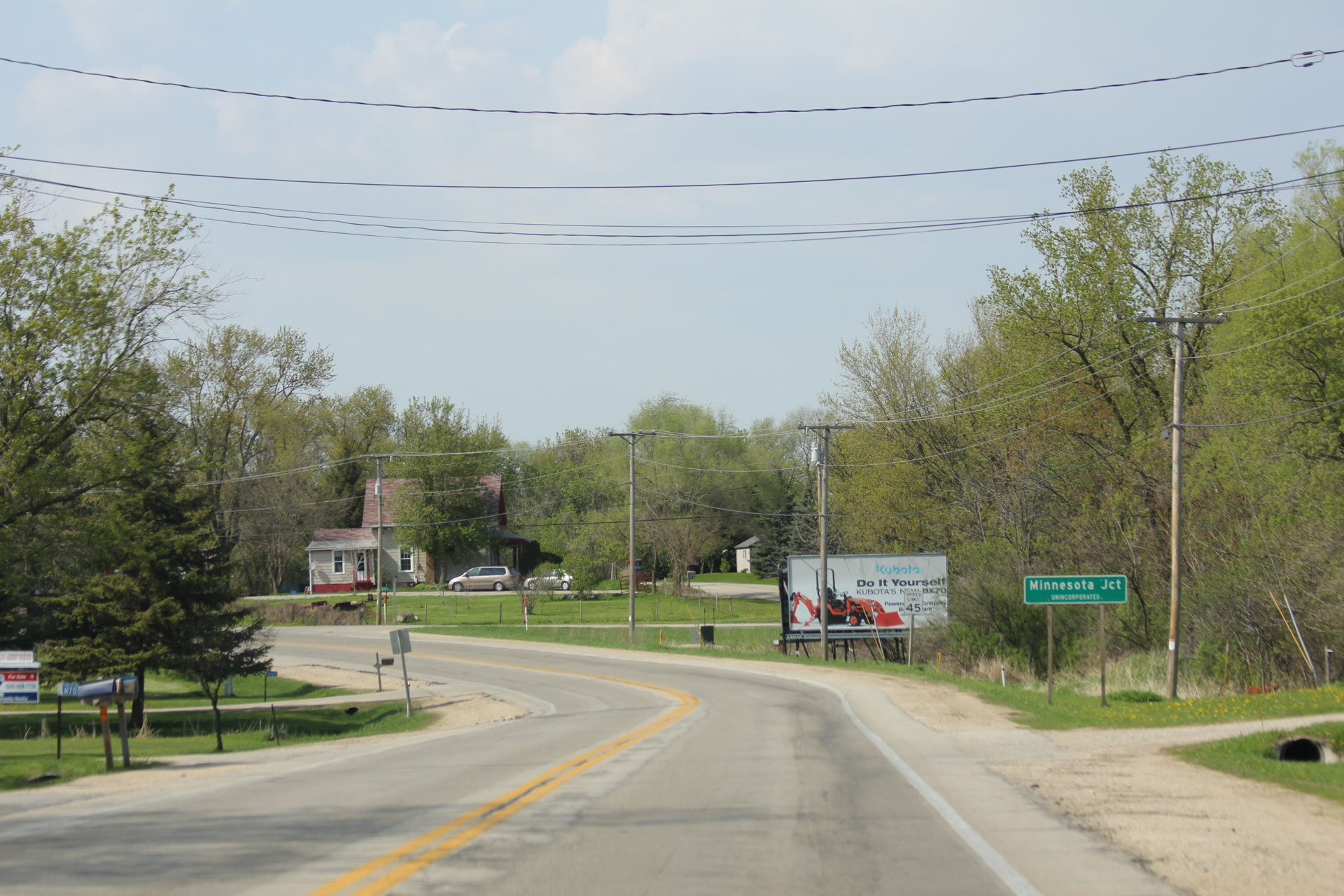
Minnesota Junction sign

Minnesota Junction is an unincorporated community located in the town of Oak Grove, in Dodge County, Wisconsin, United States. Minnesota Junction is located on Wisconsin Highway 26. It is located at latitude 43.452 and longitude -88.697 at a mean elevation of 925 feet above sea level.

== History ==
Minnesota Junction was founded when the railroad was built to that point. The community was so named from the expectation the new railroad line would eventually extend from Minnesota Junction to the Minnesota Territory. A post office was established in Minnesota Junction in 1861, and remained in operation until it was discontinued in 1940. The junction was situation where a north–south branch of the Chicago and North Western Railway met an east–west branch of the Milwaukee Road. The north–south line was abandoned in 1984, and is now a rail trail, while the east–west line is still operated by the Wisconsin and Southern Railroad.

Preceding station	Chicago and North Western Railway	Following station
Juneau toward Janesville	Janesville – Fond du Lac	Burnett toward Fond du Lac
Preceding station	Milwaukee Road	Following station
Rolling Prairie toward Portage	Portage – Horicon	Horicon Terminus
