= Fox Lake (town), Wisconsin =

Fox Lake, Wisconsin
- Town
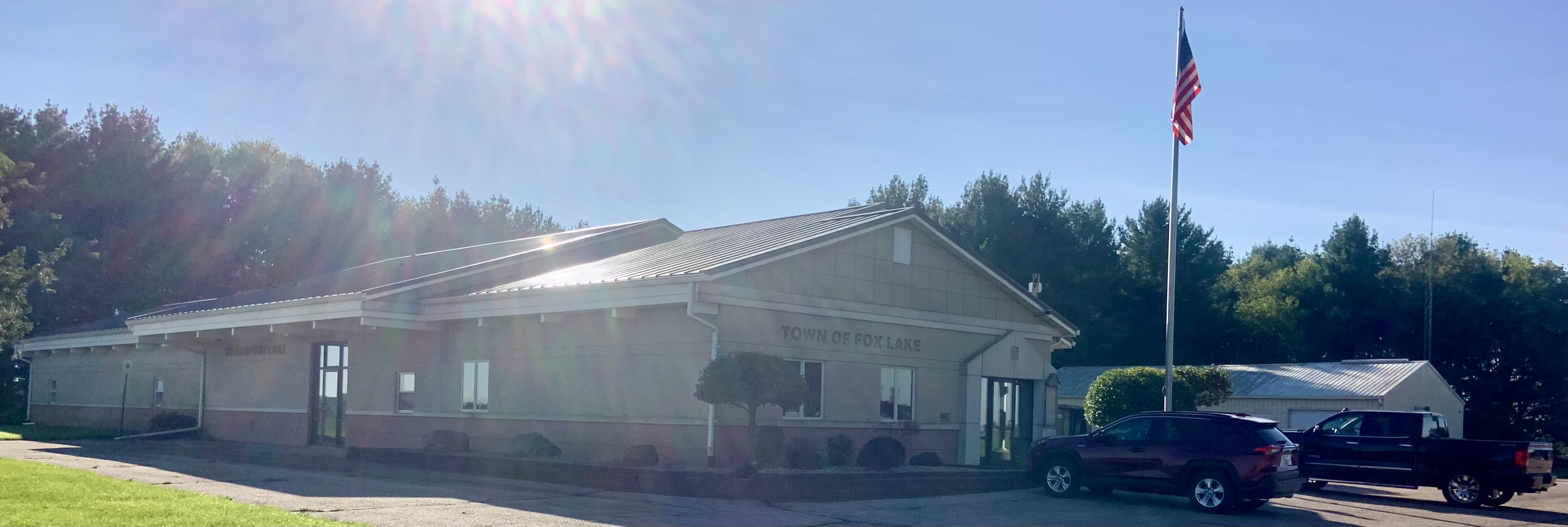
- Town hall

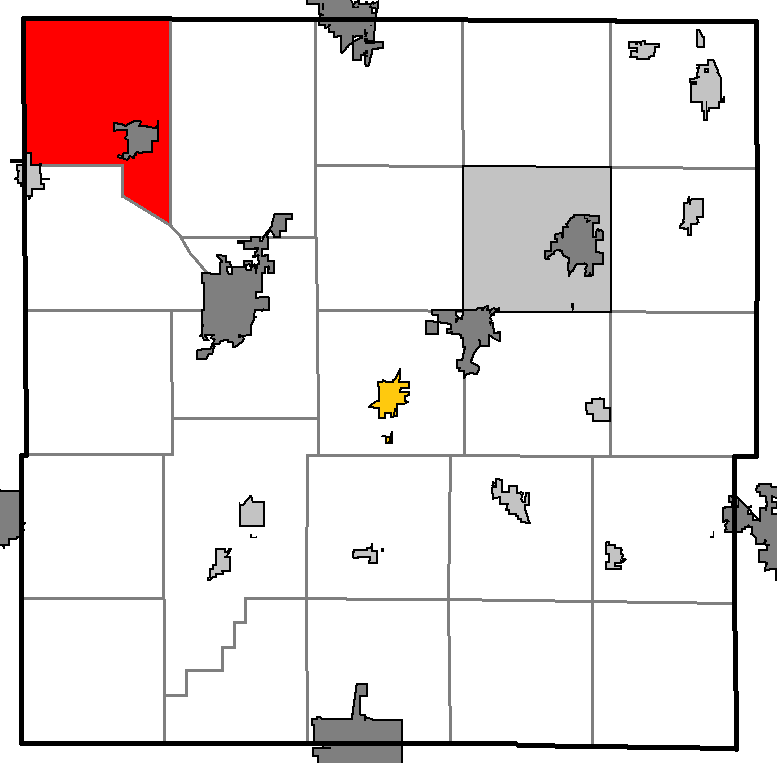
- Location of Fox Lake, within Dodge County
- Coordinates: 43°34′32″N 88°55′59″W
- Country: United States
- State: Wisconsin
- County: Dodge

Area
  - Total: 38.2 sq mi (99.0 km^{2})
  - Land: 32.2 sq mi (83.5 km^{2})
  - Water: 5.9 sq mi (15.4 km^{2})
- Elevation: 892 ft (272 m)

Population (2020)
  - Total: 2,588
  - Density: 80.3/sq mi (31.0/km^{2})
- Time zone: UTC-6 (Central (CST))
  - Summer (DST): UTC-5 (CDT)
- Area code: 920
- FIPS code: 55-27025
- GNIS feature ID: 1583226

Fox Lake is a town in Dodge County, Wisconsin, United States. The population was 2,588 at the 2020 census. The City of Fox Lake is located within the town. The unincorporated communities of Delbern Acres, Fox Lake Junction, and Lyndon Dale are also located in the town.

== Etymology ==
Fox Lake is derived from the Indian name of the Lake, hosh a rac ah tah, meaning "fox".

== Geography ==
According to the United States Census Bureau, the town has a total area of 38.2 square miles (99.0 km^{2}), of which 32.2 square miles (83.5 km^{2}) is land and 6.0 square miles (15.4 km^{2}) (15.60%) is water.

The 2,713 acre lake also known as Fox Lake is found within the town.

== Demographics ==
As of the census of 2000, there were 2,402 people, 477 households, and 341 families residing in the town. The population density was 74.5 people per square mile (28.8/km^{2}). There were 897 housing units at an average density of 27.8 per square mile (10.7/km^{2}). The racial makeup of the town was 73.40% White, 24.23% Black or African American, 1.46% Native American, 0.04% Asian, 0.08% Pacific Islander, 0.37% from other races, and 0.42% from two or more races. 3.75% of the population were Hispanic or Latino of any race.

There were 477 households, out of which 20.1% had children under the age of 18 living with them, 65.0% were married couples living together, 4.2% had a female householder with no husband present, and 28.5% were non-families. 22.4% of all households were made up of individuals, and 9.2% had someone living alone who was 65 years of age or older. The average household size was 2.40 and the average family size was 2.82.

In the town, the population was spread out, with 9.8% under the age of 18, 14.0% from 18 to 24, 45.9% from 25 to 44, 21.9% from 45 to 64, and 8.5% who were 65 years of age or older. The median age was 36 years. For every 100 females, there were 336.7 males. For every 100 females age 18 and over, there were 394.7 males.

The median income for a household in the town was $52,721, and the median income for a family was $55,817. Males had a median income of $30,592 versus $25,341 for females. The per capita income for the town was $17,227. About 2.6% of families and 5.4% of the population were below the poverty line, including 6.0% of those under age 18 and 6.2% of those age 65 or over.
