= Beaver Dam River =

River in Dodge County, Wisconsin, United States

Coordinates: 43°13′33″N 88°52′28″W

The Beaver Dam River is a 30.5-mile-long (49.1 km) tributary of the Crawfish River in south-central Wisconsin in the United States. Via the Crawfish and Rock rivers, it is part of the Mississippi River watershed.

== Course ==
The river's entire length is in Dodge County. It flows from Beaver Dam Lake at the city of Beaver Dam and follows a generally southward course, passing the village of Lowell before joining the Crawfish River at Mud Lake in the town of Shields.

== See also ==
- List of Wisconsin rivers
