= Beaverdam, Nevada =

- Census-designated place
- Location within Nevada Location within the United States
- Coordinates: 37°41′23″N 114°26′56″W
- Country: United States
- State: Nevada
- County: Lincoln

Area
  - Total: 0.69 sq mi (1.78 km^{2})
  - Land: 0.69 sq mi (1.78 km^{2})
  - Water: 0 sq mi (0.00 km^{2})
- Elevation: 4,600 ft (1,400 m)

Population (2020)
  - Total: 40
  - Density: 58.2/sq mi (22.47/km^{2})
- Time zone: UTC-8 (Pacific (PST))
  - Summer (DST): UTC-7 (PDT)
- ZIP code: 89008
- Area code: 775
- FIPS code: 32-05125
- GNIS feature ID: 2583911

Beaverdam is a census-designated place in Lincoln County, Nevada, United States. As of the 2020 census, Beaverdam had a population of 40.

== Geography ==
Beaverdam is located in the Meadow Valley, east of U.S. Route 93, 9 miles (14 km) south of Panaca and 6 miles (10 km) north of Caliente.

According to the U.S. Census Bureau, the Beaverdam CDP has an area of 0.6 square miles (1.6 km^{2}), all of it land.

== Demographics ==
Historical population
Census	Pop.	Note	%±
2010	44		—
2020	40		−9.1%
U.S. Decennial Census
