= South Beaver Dam, Wisconsin =

- Unincorporated community
- Location within the state of Wisconsin
- Coordinates: 43.4408241°N 88.8862188°W
- Country: United States
- State: Wisconsin
- County: Dodge
- Town: Calamus
- Elevation: 892 ft (272 m)
- Time zone: UTC-6 (Central (CST))
  - Summer (DST): UTC-5 (CDT)
- ZIP codes: 53916
- FIPS code: Class Code U6

South Beaver Dam is an unincorporated community in Dodge County, Wisconsin, United States, in the town of Calamus. The community is located just south of the city of Beaver Dam. The ZIP code is 53916. It is part of the Beaver Dam Micropolitan Statistical Area. The community lies on the southern shore of Beaver Dam Lake.

== Education ==
The South Beaver Dam Elementary School, which is part of the Beaver Dam Unified School District, is located in South Beaver Dam.
