= Fox Lake (Wisconsin) =

Lake in the state of Wisconsin, United States

- Location within Wisconsin Location within the United States
- Location: Dodge County, Wisconsin
- Coordinates: 43.5831539°N 88.9298318°W
- Type: Reservoir
- Surface area: 2,713 acres (1,098 ha)
- Average depth: 7 feet (2.1 m)
- Max. depth: 19 feet (5.8 m)
- Water volume: 19,307 acre-feet (23,815,000 m^{3})
- Shore length^{1}: 17.9 miles (28.8 km)
- Surface elevation: 889 feet (271 m)
- Islands: 8
- Settlements: Fox Lake, Lyndon Dale, Delbern Acres
- ^{1} Shore length is not a well-defined measure.

Fox Lake is a 2,713 acre lake in Dodge County, Wisconsin. The City of Fox Lake, and the communities of Lyndon Dale and Delbern Acres are found along the shoreline. There are two boat landings that are open to the public, found in parks on the northwest and southeast sides of the lake. Fish present in the lake are Panfish, Muskellunge, Largemouth Bass, Northern Pike, and Walleye. Fox Lake is split by the peninsula, that the community of Lyndon Dale is located on, in the south end of the lake. This forms a bay known as The Jug, near the City of Fox Lake. According to the DNR, the bottom of the lake is 1% sand, 30% gravel, and 69% muck. The lake goes through the Fox Lake Dam, into Mill Creek, then flows to Beaver Dam Lake. The Fox Lake Correctional Institution is less than a mile from the north shore of the lake.

== Parks and boat landings ==
Fox Lake has two public parks. Clausen Park, in the City of Fox Lake, and Town Park on the north west side of the lake. Both parks have public boat landings for a fee.

== Fishing ==
The Wisconsin DNR lists Musky, Panfish, Largemouth Bass, Northern Pike and Walleye as the most common fish to catch on Fox Lake. Other species are present, but do not have a large presence in the lake.

=== Stocked fish ===
Fox Lake has been artificially stocked with various kinds of fish since 1972. From the 1970s to the late 1990s, Largemouth Bass, Musky, Walleye, and Northern Pike were stocked. From 2001 to present, fish stocked in the lake were reduced to Walleye and Northern Pike. During this time, 6,785,974 Northern Pike and 1,239,607 Walleye were put into the lake.

== Islands ==
There are eight islands in Fox Lake ranging from .2 to 11.9 acres.

Island Name	Size in acres
Lone Island	.2
Elmwood Island	9.2
Dead Island	.2
Devil Island	1.8
Fetridge Island	.3
Brushwood Island	11.9
Sager Island	
Unnamed	6.9

== Invasive species ==
There have been eight separate forms of invasive species found in Fox Lake. The first was found in 1982 by the Wisconsin Department of Natural Resources. Five of the eight species have been identified in the years between 2010 and 2014.

1. Curly-Leaf Pondweed
2. Eurasian Water-Milfoil
3. Freshwater Jellyfish
4. Hybrid Eurasian / Northern Water-Milfoil
5. Phragmites (non-native)
6. Purple Loosestrife
7. Rusty Crayfish
8. Zebra Mussel

== See also ==
- List of lakes in Wisconsin
- List of islands of Wisconsin
