= Westford, Dodge County, Wisconsin =

Westford, Wisconsin
- Town
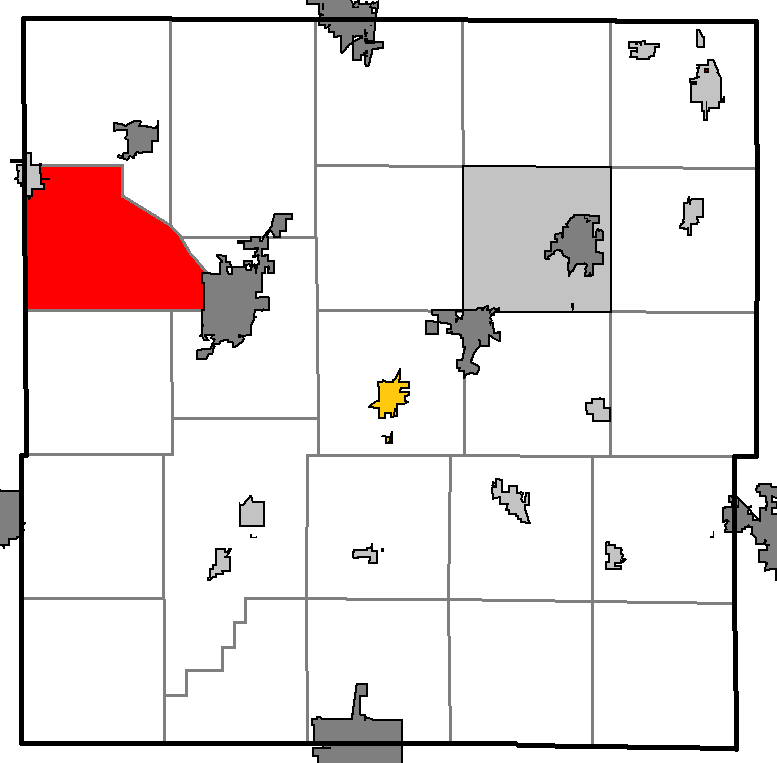
- Location of Westford, within Dodge County
- Coordinates: 43°30′41″N 88°57′2″W
- Country: United States
- State: Wisconsin
- County: Dodge

Area
  - Total: 34.8 sq mi (90.1 km^{2})
  - Land: 30.2 sq mi (78.1 km^{2})
  - Water: 4.6 sq mi (12.0 km^{2})
- Elevation: 869 ft (265 m)

Population (2020)
  - Total: 1,313
  - Density: 43.5/sq mi (16.8/km^{2})
- Time zone: UTC-6 (Central (CST))
  - Summer (DST): UTC-5 (CDT)
- FIPS code: 55-85650
- GNIS feature ID: 1584406
- Website: https://townofwestfordwi.gov/

Westford is a town in Dodge County, Wisconsin, United States. The population was 1,313 at the 2020 census. The unincorporated community of South Randolph is located in the town. The unincorporated community of Lost Lake is also located partially in the town.

== Geography ==
According to the United States Census Bureau, the town has a total area of 34.8 square miles (90.1 km^{2}), of which 30.2 square miles (78.1 km^{2}) is land and 4.6 square miles (12.0 km^{2}) (13.30%) is water.

== Demographics ==
As of the census of 2000, there were 1,400 people, 551 households, and 413 families living in the town. The population density was 46.4 people per square mile (17.9/km^{2}). There were 709 housing units at an average density of 23.5 per square mile (9.1/km^{2}). The racial makeup of the town was 97.00% White, 0.07% African American, 0.57% Native American, 0.07% Asian, 1.93% from other races, and 0.36% from two or more races. Hispanic or Latino of any race were 2.64% of the population.

There were 551 households, out of which 28.7% had children under the age of 18 living with them, 66.8% were married couples living together, 4.2% had a female householder with no husband present, and 24.9% were non-families. 18.9% of all households were made up of individuals, and 5.6% had someone living alone who was 65 years of age or older. The average household size was 2.54 and the average family size was 2.89.

In the town, the population was spread out, with 22.5% under the age of 18, 5.7% from 18 to 24, 30.4% from 25 to 44, 25.9% from 45 to 64, and 15.5% who were 65 years of age or older. The median age was 41 years. For every 100 females, there were 107.4 males. For every 100 females age 18 and over, there were 110.3 males.

The median income for a household in the town was $48,516, and the median income for a family was $52,188. Males had a median income of $37,083 versus $24,205 for females. The per capita income for the town was $22,582. About 1.4% of families and 2.8% of the population were below the poverty line, including 2.6% of those under age 18 and 3.0% of those age 65 or over.

== Notable people ==
- Joseph Biel, farmer, businessman, and politician, lived in the town
