= Rolling Prairie, Wisconsin =

- Unincorporated community
- Location within Wisconsin Location within the United States
- Coordinates: 43°27′33″N 88°44′03″W
- Country: United States
- State: Wisconsin
- County: Dodge
- Elevation: 928 ft (283 m)
- Time zone: UTC-6 (Central (CST))
  - Summer (DST): UTC-5 (CDT)
- Zip: 53077
- Area code: 920
- GNIS feature ID: 1572550

Rolling Prairie is an unincorporated community located between the towns of Oak Grove and Burnett in Dodge County, Wisconsin, United States.

== Notable people ==
- Lyman Linde, baseball player
