= Beaver Dam Lake (Wisconsin) =

Lake in the state of Wisconsin, United States

- Location within Wisconsin Location within the United States
- Location: Dodge County, Wisconsin
- Coordinates: 43.5205513°N 88.9023628°W
- Type: Drainage Lake
- River sources: Beaver Dam River
- Surface area: 6,718 acres (2,719 ha)
- Average depth: 5 feet (1.5 m)
- Max. depth: 7 feet (2.1 m)
- Water volume: 30,677 acre-feet (37,840,000 m^{3})
- Shore length^{1}: 41.20 miles (66.30 km)
- Surface elevation: 869 feet (265 m)
- Islands: 26
- Settlements: Beaver Dam, South Beaver Dam, Sunset Beach, Beaver Edge, Fox Lake Junction
- ^{1} Shore length is not a well-defined measure.

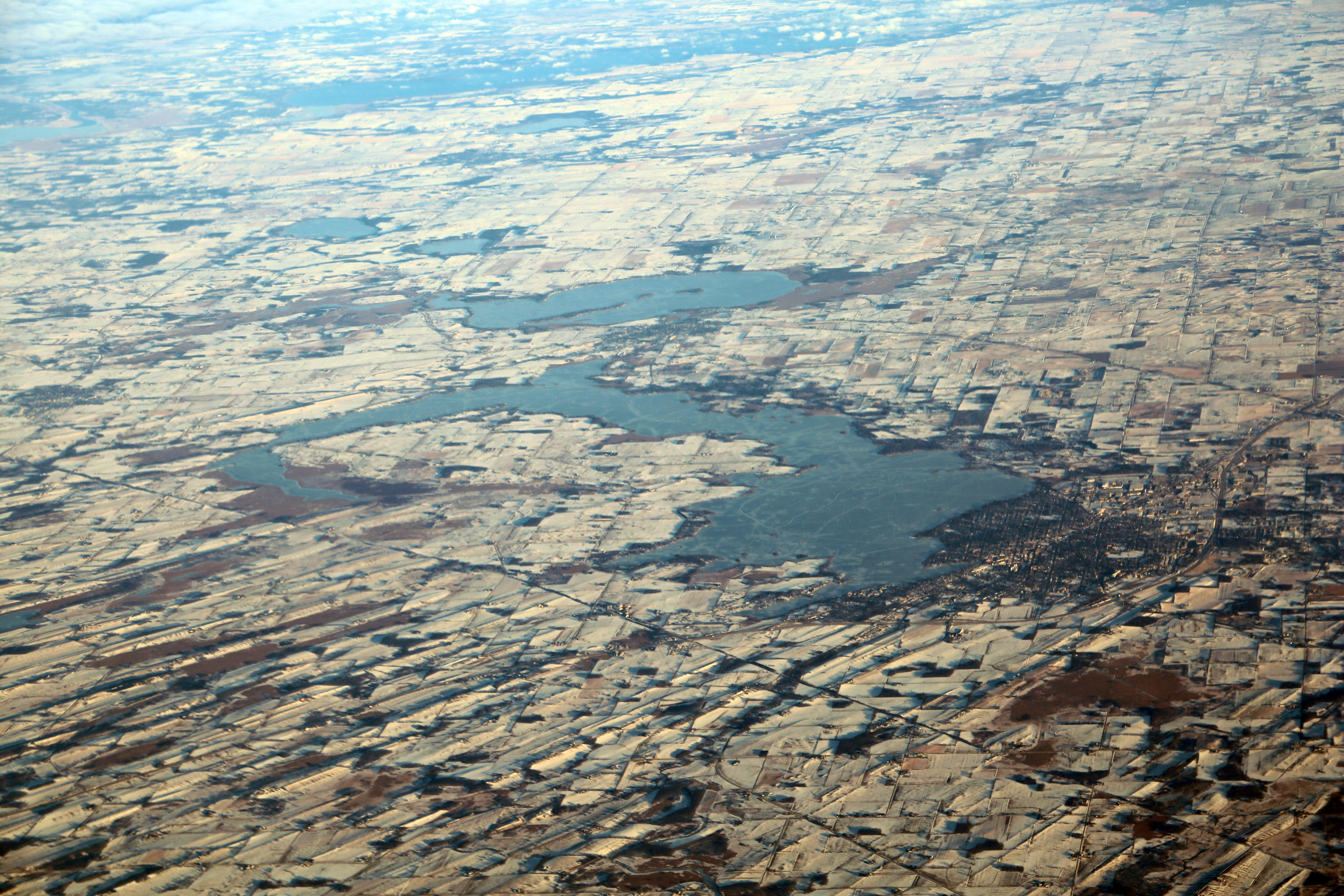
Beaver Dam city and lake, Wisconsin

Beaver Dam Lake is a 6,718 acre lake in Dodge County, Wisconsin. The communities of Beaver Dam, South Beaver Dam, Sunset Beach, Beaver Edge, Fox Lake Junction border the lake. The fish present in the lake are Panfish, Largemouth Bass, Northern Pike, and Walleye. The lake is created by a dam located in the City of Beaver Dam at Haskell Street and flows into the Beaver Dam River. There are seven public boat landings and numerous parks along the lake shore.

Water from Fox Lake flows through the Mill Creek into Beaver Dam Lake.

== Islands ==
There are 26 islands in Beaver Dam Lake ranging from 0.1 to 2.8 acres. All of the islands are privately owned.

Island Name	Size in acres
Grape Island	0.2
Cuba Island	0.6
Round Island	0.6
Little Skunk Island	0.7
Big Skunk Island	1.8
Jones Island	0.8
Fish Camp Island	0.9
Goose Island	0.2
Little Goose Island	0.4
Mink Island	0.1
Wayside Island	1.5
New Island	2.1
Fisher Island	2.8
Seering Island	0.9
Small Island	0.2
Hupf’s Island	0.2
Middle Island	0.6
High Island	0.7
Moon Island	0.8
Lueck Island	0.2
Miller’s Island	0.2
Buckeye Island	1.8
Snipes Island	1.6
Neilsen’s Island	1.6
Majestic Island	1.9
Babe’s Island	1.4
Kopf Island	0.9
Evergreen Island	1.1

== See also ==
- List of lakes in Wisconsin
