= Beaver Dam, Utah =

Unincorporated community in the state of Utah, United States

- Unincorporated community
- Location of Beaver Dam within the State of Utah
- Coordinates: 41°48′34″N 112°03′32″W
- Country: United States
- State: Utah
- County: Box Elder
- Settled: 1867
- Named for: The numerous beaver dams on Willow Creek
- Elevation: 4,541 ft (1,384 m)
- Time zone: UTC-7 (Mountain (MST))
  - Summer (DST): UTC-6 (MDT)
- ZIP code: 84306
- Area code: 435
- GNIS feature ID: 1438527

Beaver Dam (also Beaverdam) is an unincorporated community on the northeastern edge of Box Elder County, Utah, United States.

== History ==
Beaver Dam was settled in 1867 by people from the nearby communities of Providence and Deweyville and was named for the numerous beaver dams along nearby Willow Creek.

In 1868, the first co-op dairy in Utah was established there.
