= Beaver Dam Township, Cumberland County, North Carolina =

Coordinates: 34°54′28″N 78°38′12″W

Beaver Dam (officially, Township of Beaver Dam) is a township in Cumberland County, North Carolina, United States. It is situated at an elevation of 115 feet (35 m).
