= Beaver Dam State Park (Illinois) =

State park in Macoupin County, Illinois, United States

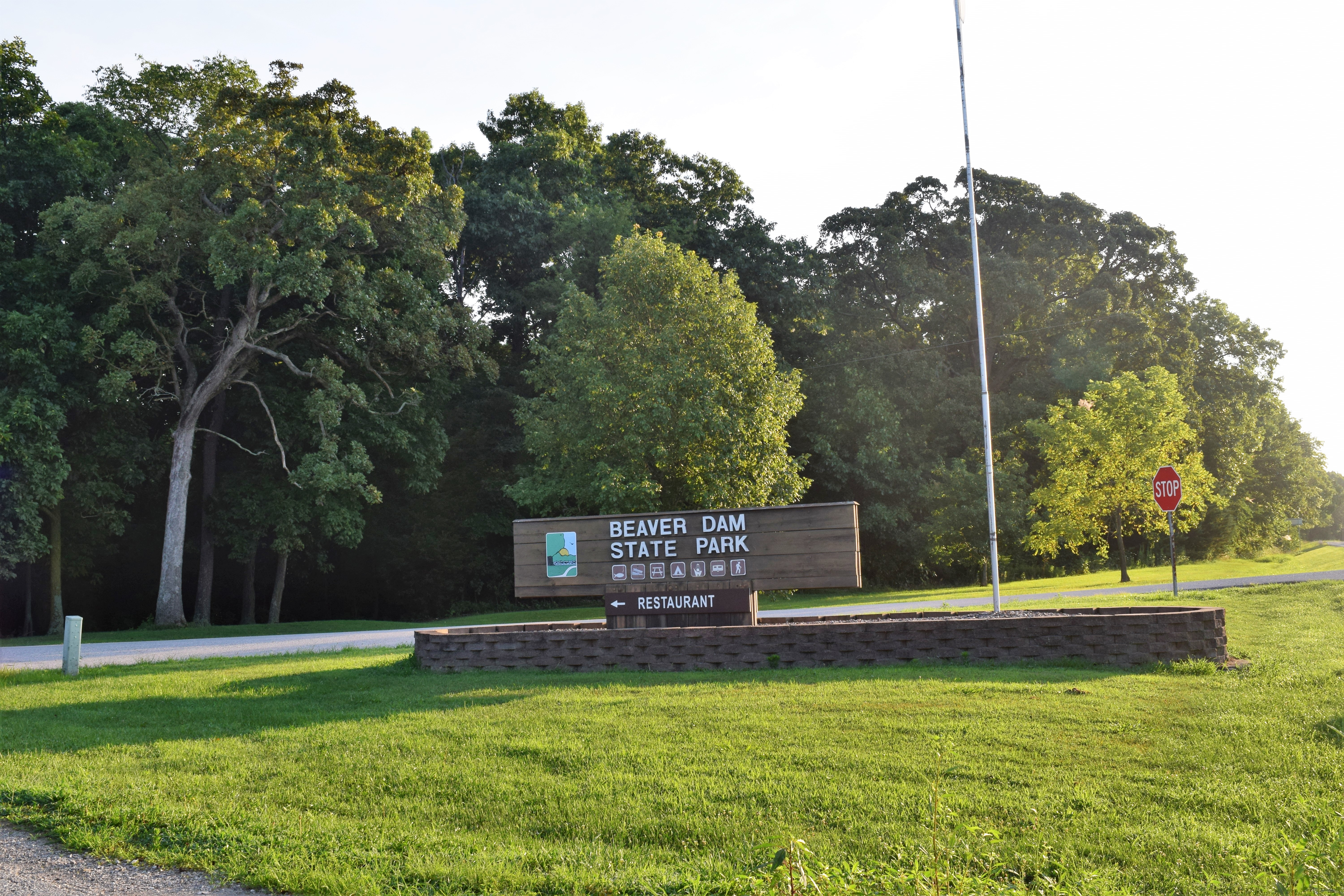
- Entrance to Beaver Dam State Park

- Location within Illinois Location within the United States
- Location: Macoupin County, Illinois, USA
- Nearest city: Carlinville, Illinois
- Coordinates: 39°12′40″N 89°58′34″W
- Area: 750 acres (304 ha)
- Established: 1947
- Governing body: Illinois Department of Natural Resources

Beaver Dam State Park is an Illinois state park on 750 acres (304 ha) in Macoupin County, Illinois in the United States. The park is 7 miles (11 km) southwest of Carlinville, Illinois and is managed by the Illinois Department of Natural Resources (IDNR) as a public place for fishing.

The state park centers on the 59-acre (24 ha) Beaver Dam Lake, an artificial reservoir which was created by a private Carlinville fishing club in the 1890s. The club later became a private resort which catered to visitors who arrived via the adjacent Chicago and Alton Railroad. During the Great Depression, the resort failed. The state of Illinois purchased the lake and some adjacent property in 1947. Additional land purchases have created the present-day Beaver Dam State Park.

The IDNR manages Beaver Dam Lake for the fishing of largemouth bass, bluegill, channel catfish, and sunfish. In addition, the park offers opportunities for the hunting of deer, wild turkey, and small game. There is a power limit for boats using the Beaver Dam Lake reservoir, with no gasoline-powered motors allowed.

Beaver Dam State Park preserves part of the historic oak-hickory forests that line upper Macoupin Creek. There are 8 miles (13 km) of hiking trails in the park. The reservoir and park drain into a tributary of Macoupin Creek.
