= Trenton, Dodge County, Wisconsin =

Trenton, Wisconsin
- Town
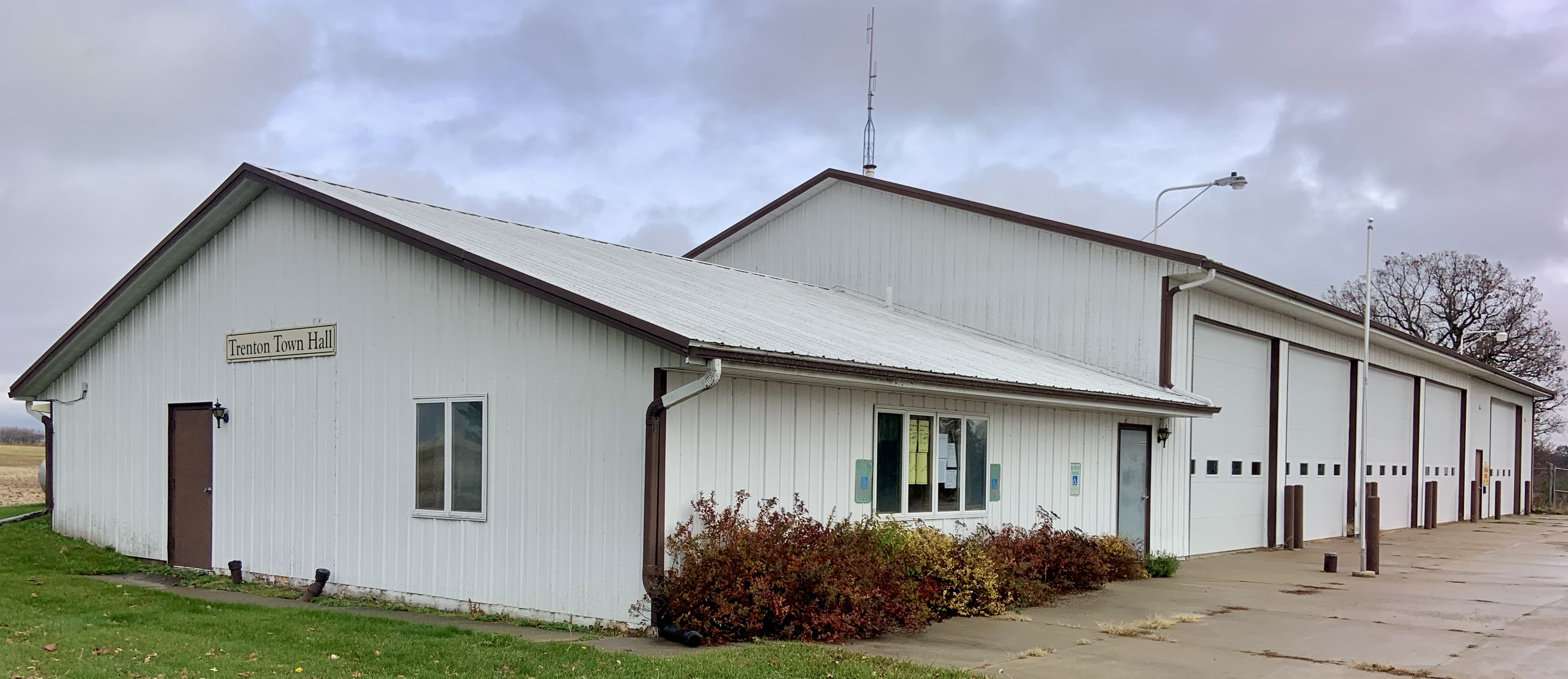
- Town hall

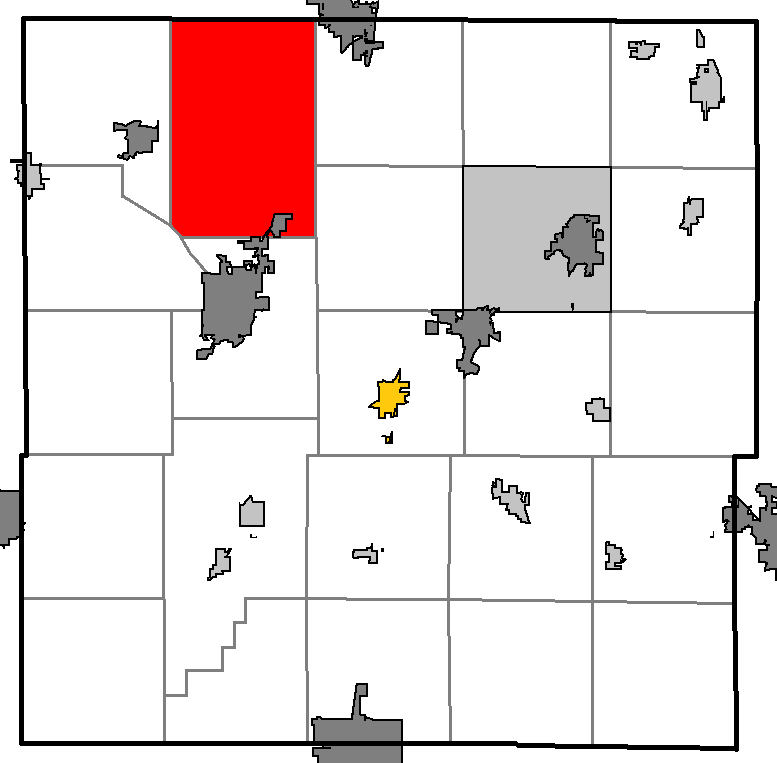
- Location of Trenton, within Dodge County
- Coordinates: 43°33′51″N 88°50′7″W
- Country: United States
- State: Wisconsin
- County: Dodge

Area
  - Total: 54.4 sq mi (140.9 km^{2})
  - Land: 53.9 sq mi (139.5 km^{2})
  - Water: 0.54 sq mi (1.4 km^{2})
- Elevation: 991 ft (302 m)

Population (2020)
  - Total: 1,219
  - Density: 22.63/sq mi (8.738/km^{2})
- Time zone: UTC-6 (Central (CST))
  - Summer (DST): UTC-5 (CDT)
- FIPS code: 55-80525
- GNIS feature ID: 1584292
- Website: https://tn.trenton.wi.gov/

Trenton is a town in Dodge County, Wisconsin, United States. The population was 1,219 at the 2020 census.

== Geography ==
According to the United States Census Bureau, the town has a total area of 54.4 square miles (140.8 km^{2}), of which 53.9 square miles (139.5 km^{2}) is land and 0.5 square mile (1.3 km^{2}) (0.96%) is water.

== Demographics ==
At the 2000 census there were 1,301 people, 456 households, and 378 families living in the town. The population density was 24.2 people per square mile (9.3/km^{2}). There were 471 housing units at an average density of 8.7 per square mile (3.4/km^{2}). The racial makeup of the town was 98.31% White, 0.61% African American, 0.38% Native American, 0.23% Asian, and 0.46% from two or more races. Hispanic or Latino of any race were 0.92%.

Of the 456 households 36.8% had children under the age of 18 living with them, 75.2% were married couples living together, 3.9% had a female householder with no husband present, and 17.1% were non-families. 12.7% of households were one person and 5.0% were one person aged 65 or older. The average household size was 2.85 and the average family size was 3.14.

The age distribution was 27.1% under the age of 18, 6.6% from 18 to 24, 29.5% from 25 to 44, 26.1% from 45 to 64, and 10.7% 65 or older. The median age was 39 years. For every 100 females, there were 112.6 males. For every 100 females age 18 and over, there were 111.8 males.

The median household income was $50,820 and the median family income was $52,407. Males had a median income of $35,167 versus $23,750 for females. The per capita income for the town was $19,374. About 4.8% of families and 4.4% of the population were below the poverty line, including 2.5% of those under age 18 and 7.0% of those age 65 or over.
