= Calamus, Wisconsin =

- Town
- Motto: "Proud of our Farming Heritage"
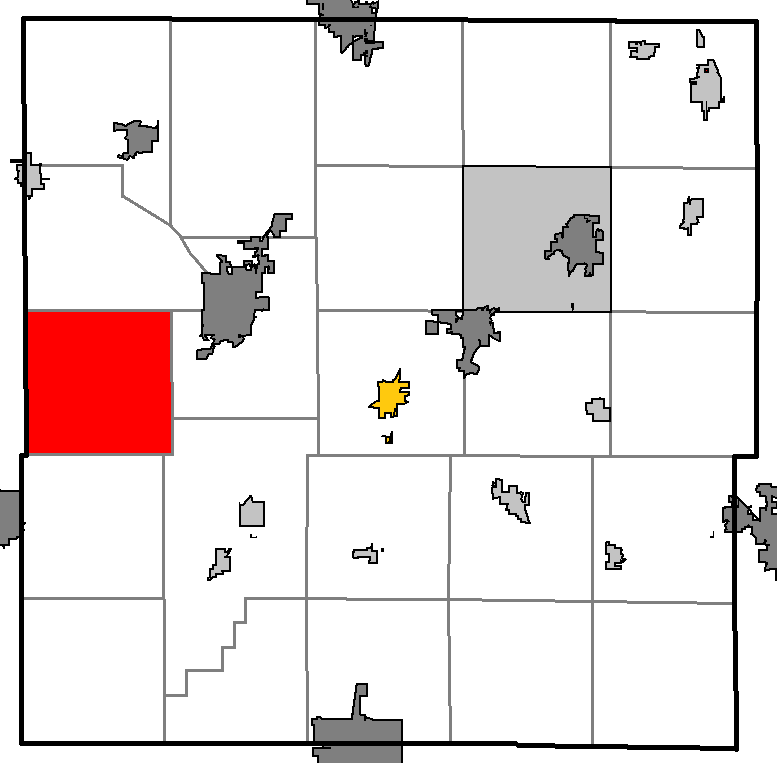
- Location of Calamus, within Dodge County
- Coordinates: 43°25′13″N 88°56′51″W
- Country: United States
- State: Wisconsin
- County: Dodge

Area
  - Total: 36.6 sq mi (94.7 km^{2})
  - Land: 36.1 sq mi (93.5 km^{2})
  - Water: 0.46 sq mi (1.2 km^{2})
- Elevation: 890 ft (270 m)

Population (2020)
  - Total: 1,043
  - Density: 28.9/sq mi (11.2/km^{2})
- Time zone: UTC-6 (Central (CST))
  - Summer (DST): UTC-5 (CDT)
- Area code: 920
- FIPS code: 55-11850
- GNIS feature ID: 1582902
- Website: Town of Calamus, Dodge County, Wisconsin

Calamus is a town in Dodge County, Wisconsin, United States. The population was 1,043 at the 2020 census. The unincorporated community of South Beaver Dam is located in the town. The unincorporated community of Lost Lake is also located partially in the town.

== History ==
The town was founded on January 22, 1846.

== Geography ==
According to the United States Census Bureau, the town has a total area of 36.5 square miles (94.7 km^{2}), of which 36.1 square miles (93.4 km^{2}) is land and 0.5 square mile (1.2 km^{2}) (1.29%) is water.

== Demographics ==
As of the census of 2000, there were 1,005 people, 379 households, and 297 families living in the town. The population density was 27.9 people per square mile (10.8/km^{2}). There were 396 housing units at an average density of 11.0 per square mile (4.2/km^{2}). The racial makeup of the town was 97.71% White, 0.70% African American, 0.90% Native American, 0.30% from other races, and 0.40% from two or more races. Hispanic or Latino of any race were 1.00% of the population.

There were 379 households, out of which 31.9% had children under the age of 18 living with them, 67.0% were married couples living together, 5.8% had a female householder with no husband present, and 21.6% were non-families. 14.8% of all households were made up of individuals, and 4.2% had someone living alone who was 65 years of age or older. The average household size was 2.65 and the average family size was 2.95.

In the town, the population was spread out, with 23.2% under the age of 18, 7.7% from 18 to 24, 29.8% from 25 to 44, 26.8% from 45 to 64, and 12.6% who were 65 years of age or older. The median age was 39 years. For every 100 females, there were 105.1 males. For every 100 females age 18 and over, there were 110.4 males.

The median income for a household in the town was $50,000, and the median income for a family was $54,107. Males had a median income of $33,636 versus $24,671 for females. The per capita income for the town was $19,818. About 5.5% of families and 7.8% of the population were below the poverty line, including 13.0% of those under age 18 and 5.4% of those age 65 or over.
