= Fox Lake, Wisconsin =

Fox Lake
- City
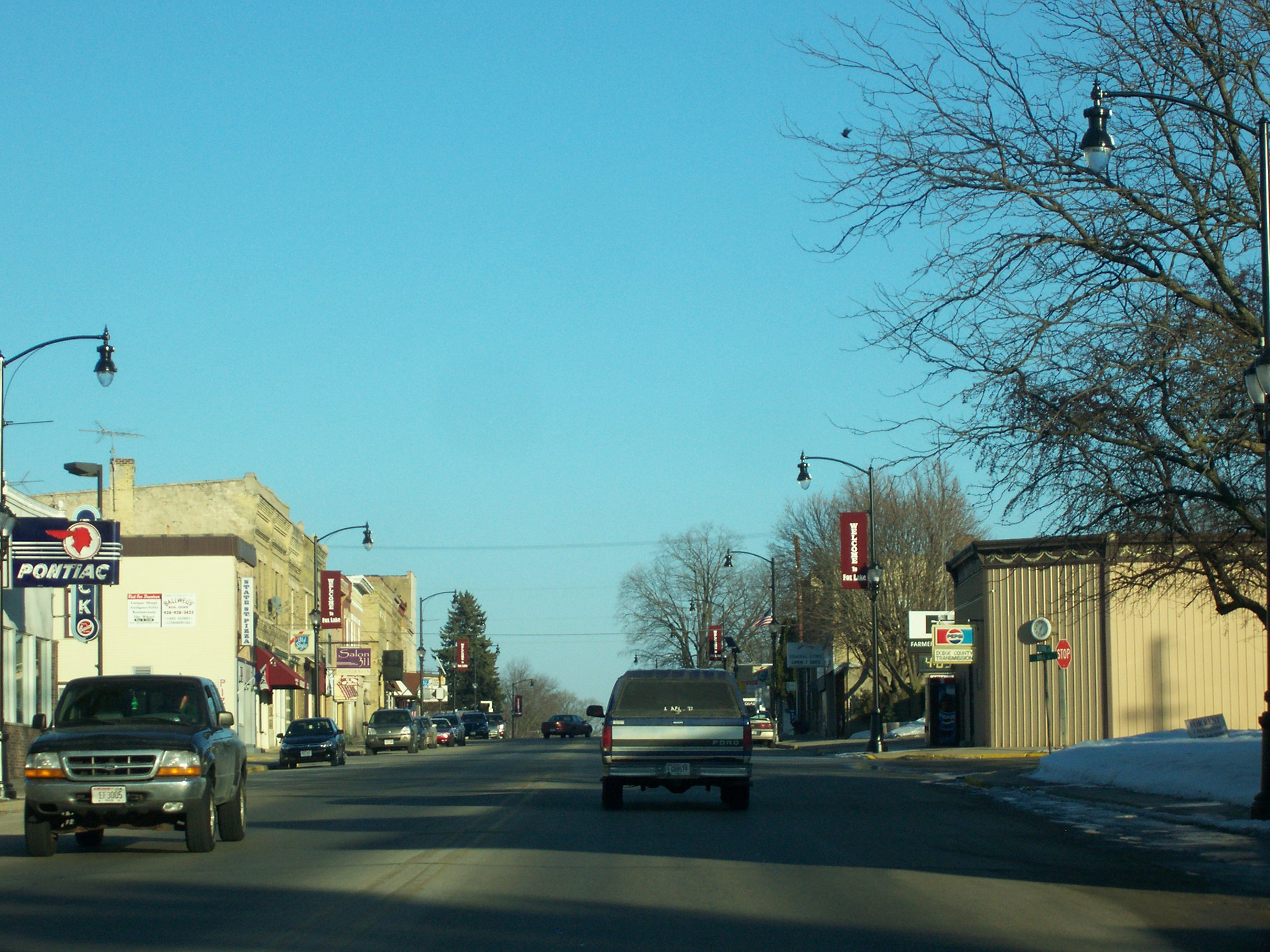
- Downtown Fox Lake in February 2009

- Location of Fox Lake in Dodge County, Wisconsin.

- Location within Wisconsin Location within the United States
- Coordinates: 43°33′46″N 88°54′36″W
- Country: United States
- State: Wisconsin
- County: Dodge

Area
  - Total: 1.62 sq mi (4.20 km^{2})
  - Land: 1.57 sq mi (4.06 km^{2})
  - Water: 0.054 sq mi (0.14 km^{2})
- Elevation: 919 ft (280 m)

Population (2020)
  - Total: 1,604
  - Density: 1,020/sq mi (395/km^{2})
- Time zone: UTC-6 (Central (CST))
  - Summer (DST): UTC-5 (CDT)
- Area code: 920
- FIPS code: 55-27000
- GNIS feature ID: 1583225
- Website: cityoffoxlake.org

Fox Lake is a city in Dodge County, Wisconsin, United States. The population was 1,604 at the 2020 census. The city is located within the Town of Fox Lake.

== History ==
Established in 1838, Fox Lake was the first settlement in Dodge County. The first inhabitants were Winnebago Indians who had named the area "Hosh-a-rac-ah-tah", meaning "good land". The area was later named Fox Lake, either in honor of a Winnebago Indian named Big Fox who saved a lost trapper or for the English translation of the Indian name of the town.

== Geography ==
Fox Lake is located at 43°33'45" North, 88°54'35" West (43.56265, -88.90994).

According to the United States Census Bureau, the city has a total area of 1.61 square miles (4.17 km^{2}), of which, 1.56 square miles (4.04 km^{2}) is land and 0.05 square miles (0.13 km^{2}) is water.

The 2,713 acre lake also known as Fox Lake is found north of the city.

== Demographics ==
Historical population
Census	Pop.	Note	%±
1860	1,178		—
1870	1,086		−7.8%
1880	955		−12.1%
1890	814		−14.8%
1900	890		9.3%
1910	851		−4.4%
1920	1,012		18.9%
1930	901		−11.0%
1940	1,016		12.8%
1950	1,153		13.5%
1960	1,181		2.4%
1970	1,242		5.2%
1980	1,373		10.5%
1990	1,269		−7.6%
2000	1,454		14.6%
2010	1,519		4.5%
2020	1,604		5.6%
U.S. Decennial Census

=== 2010 census ===
As of the census of 2010, there were 1,519 people, 663 households, and 400 families living in the city. The population density was 973.7 inhabitants per square mile (375.9/km^{2}). There were 801 housing units at an average density of 513.5 per square mile (198.3/km^{2}). The racial makeup of the city was 98.0% White, 0.3% African American, 0.3% Native American, 0.3% Asian, 0.7% from other races, and 0.5% from two or more races. Hispanic or Latino of any race were 2.4% of the population.

There were 663 households, of which 27.6% had children under the age of 18 living with them, 45.7% were married couples living together, 8.0% had a female householder with no husband present, 6.6% had a male householder with no wife present, and 39.7% were non-families. 31.2% of all households were made up of individuals, and 13.7% had someone living alone who was 65 years of age or older. The average household size was 2.28 and the average family size was 2.86.

The median age in the city was 42.5 years. 20.9% of residents were under the age of 18; 7.1% were between the ages of 18 and 24; 25.3% were from 25 to 44; 30% were from 45 to 64; and 16.7% were 65 years of age or older. The gender makeup of the city was 52.0% male and 48.0% female.

=== 2000 census ===
As of the census of 2000, there were 1,454 people, 615 households, and 373 families living in the city. The population density was 1,036.1 people per square mile (401.0/km^{2}). There were 695 housing units at an average density of 495.3 per square mile (191.7/km^{2}). The racial makeup of the city was 97.32% White, 0.76% Black or African American, 0.21% Native American, 0.21% Asian, 0.00% Pacific Islander, 0.48% from other races, and 1.03% from two or more races. 3.51% of the population were Hispanic or Latino of any race.

There were 615 households, out of which 27.2% had children under the age of 18 living with them, 48.0% were married couples living together, 8.3% had a female householder with no husband present, and 39.3% were non-families. 32.8% of all households were made up of individuals, and 15.1% had someone living alone who was 65 years of age or older. The average household size was 2.34 and the average family size was 2.97.

In the city, the population was spread out, with 23.7% under the age of 18, 8.5% from 18 to 24, 28.3% from 25 to 44, 21.9% from 45 to 64, and 17.7% who were 65 years of age or older. The median age was 38 years. For every 100 females, there were 97.6 males. For every 100 females age 18 and over, there were 97.7 males.

The median income for a household in the city was $36,607, and the median income for a family was $44,904. Males had a median income of $33,105 versus $21,833 for females. The per capita income for the city was $17,753. 7.7% of the population and 4.7% of families were below the poverty line. 9.6% of those under the age of 18 and 9.4% of those 65 and older were living below the poverty line.

== Arts and culture ==
=== Annual cultural events ===
The Bunny Berigan Jazz Jubilee is an annual celebration in May in honor of jazz trumpeter Bunny Berigan. The festival began in 1973 and is a three-day event featuring various musical entertainers and presentations on Berigan.

=== Tourism ===
In 1983 Wisconsin's largest archaeology discovery was made in Fox Lake. Artifacts from the dig and local history are displayed in the Fox Lake Historical Museum, located inside the 1884 Fox Lake Railroad Depot. The Depot is on the list of the National Register of Historic Places and a model of the Loop & Junction railroad, working blacksmith shop, Congregational Church and Sinclair Gas Station are on display inside the depot.

== Education ==
=== Public schools ===
Fox Lake is served by the Waupun School District. The school district has several schools including SAGES, Meadow View Primary, Rock River Intermediate and Waupun High School. SAGES (School for Agriculture and Environmental Studies) is located in Fox Lake.

=== Private schools ===
St. John's Evangelical Lutheran Church and School is a private coeducational school located in Fox Lake. It is affiliated with the Wisconsin Evangelical Lutheran Synod.

=== Libraries ===
The Fox Lake Public Library is located in Fox Lake.

== Infrastructure ==
=== Prisons ===
Fox Lake Correctional Institution is located in Fox Lake and is a medium security facility for adult offenders. It is a state prison operated by the Wisconsin Department of Corrections.

== Notable people ==
- Bunny Berigan, jazz trumpeter, considered Fox Lake to be his hometown
- Willis G. Calderwood, Minnesota progressive politician
- Harley Sanford Jones, U.S. Air Force general
- Stoddard Judd, physician and politician
- William E. Smith, 14th Governor of Wisconsin

== Gallery ==
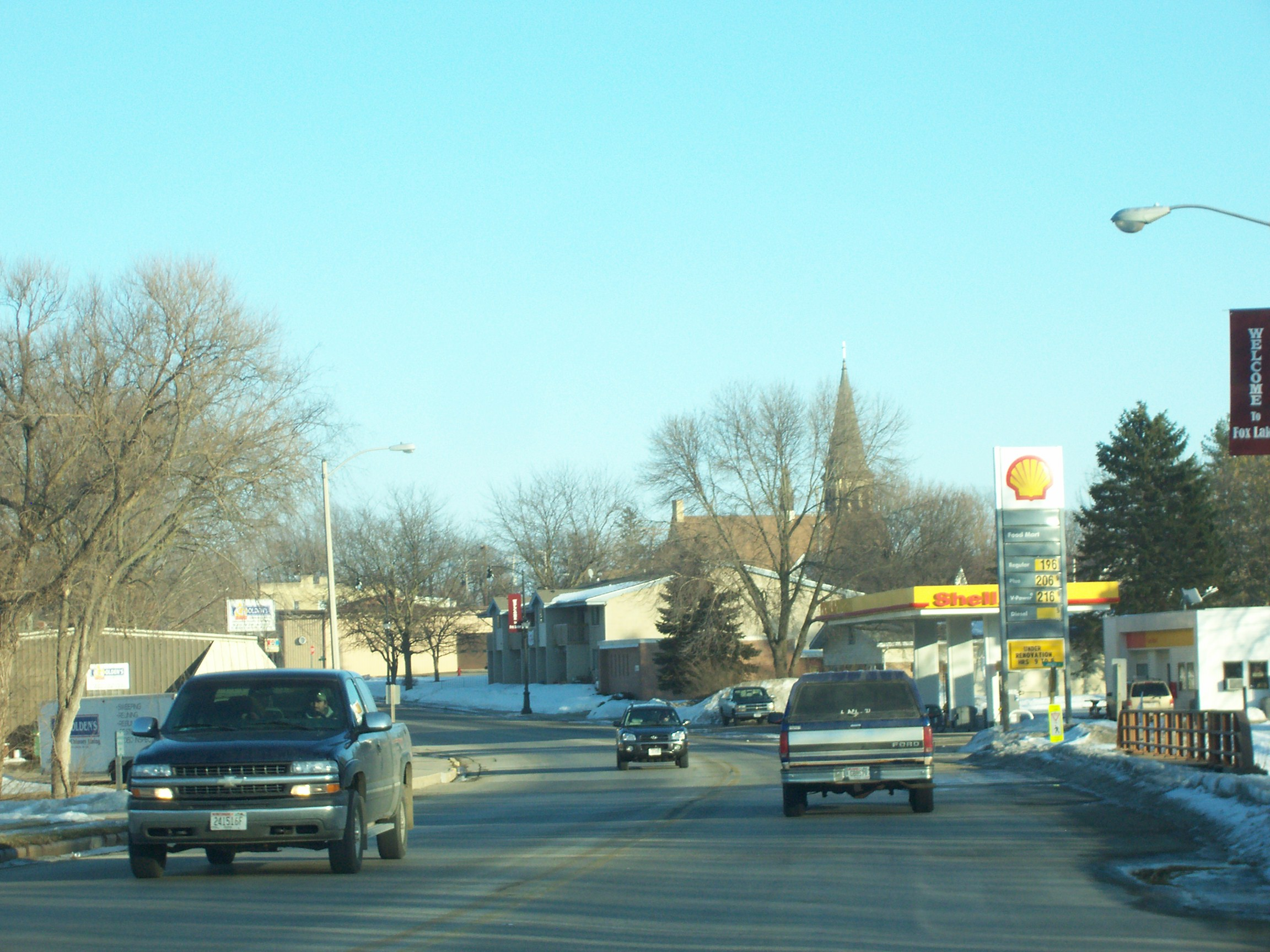
Fox Lake skyline

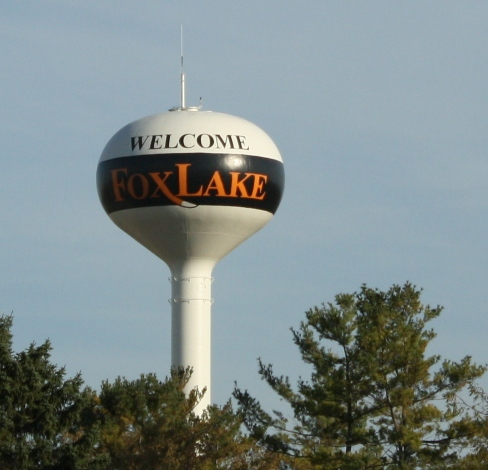
Water tower

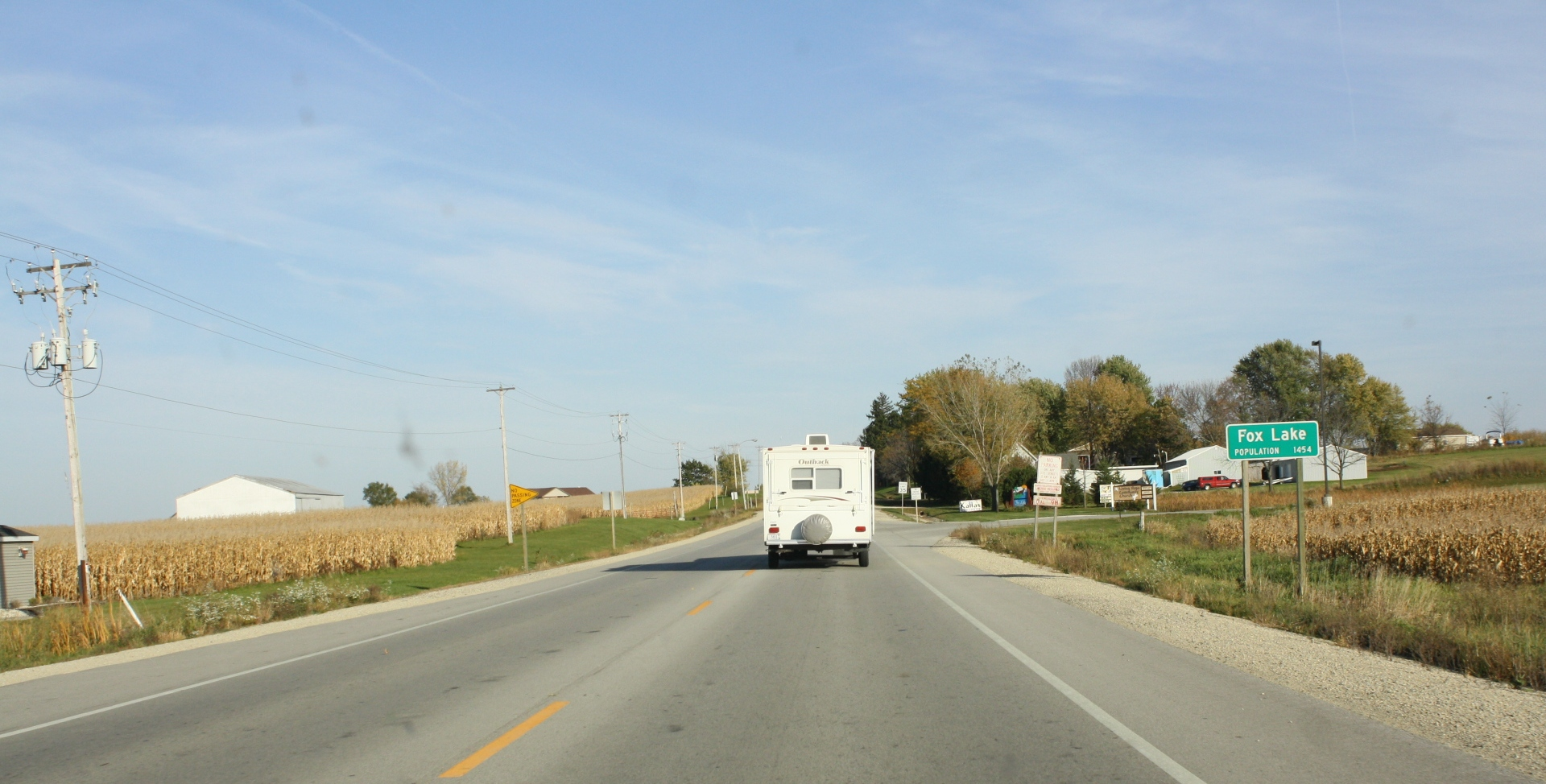
Sign on WIS 33

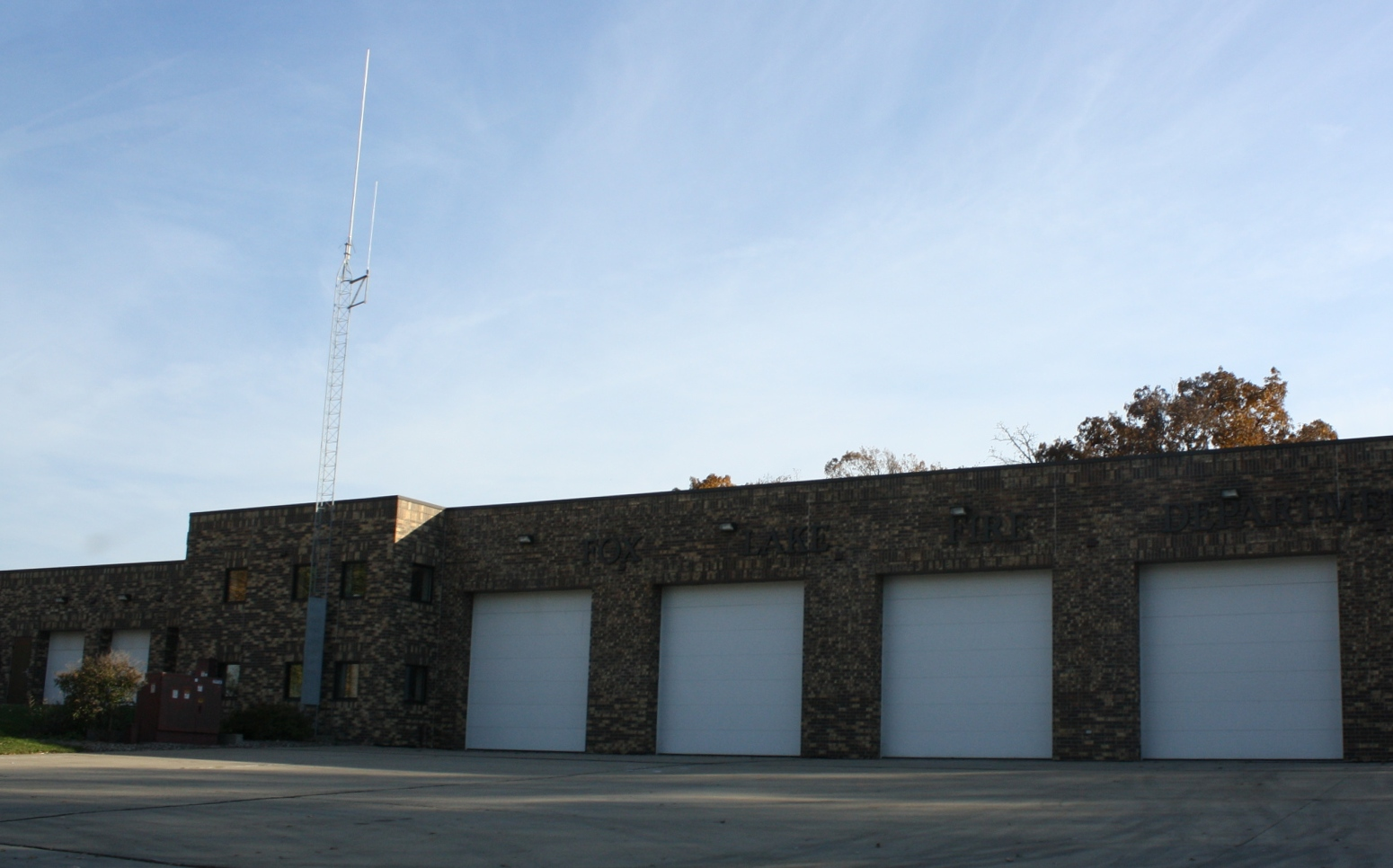
Fire station
