= Beaver Dam (town), Wisconsin =

Beaver Dam, Wisconsin
- Town
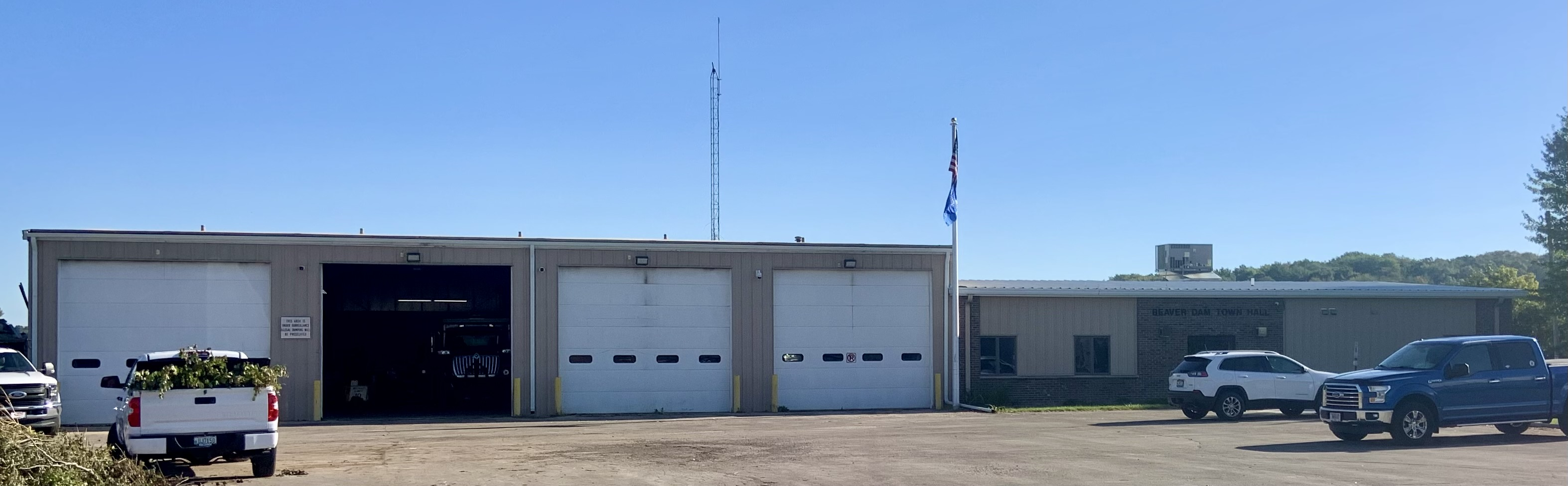
- Town hall

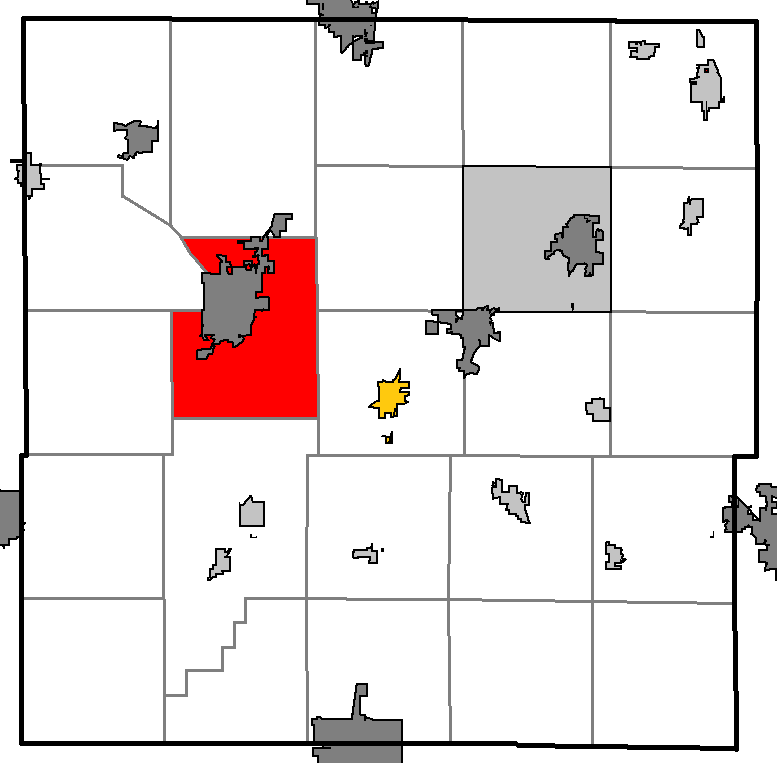
- Location of Beaver Dam, within Dodge County
- Coordinates: 43°26′35″N 88°49′31″W
- Country: United States
- State: Wisconsin
- County: Dodge

Area
  - Total: 37.0 sq mi (95.9 km^{2})
  - Land: 34.2 sq mi (88.7 km^{2})
  - Water: 2.8 sq mi (7.2 km^{2})
- Elevation: 869 ft (265 m)

Population (2020)
  - Total: 4,062
  - Density: 119/sq mi (45.8/km^{2})
- Time zone: UTC-6 (Central (CST))
  - Summer (DST): UTC-5 (CDT)
- Area code: 920
- FIPS code: 55-05925
- GNIS feature ID: 1582778
- Website: www.townofbeaverdam.org

Beaver Dam is a town in Dodge County, Wisconsin, United States. The population was 4,062 at the 2020 census. The City of Beaver Dam is encircled by the town. The unincorporated communities of Beaver Edge, Leipsig and Sunset Beach are located in the town. The ghost town of Clason Prairie was also located in the town.

== Geography ==
According to the United States Census Bureau, the town has a total area of 37 square miles (96 km^{2}), of which 34.3 square miles (89 km^{2}) is land and 2.8 square miles (7.3 km^{2}) (7.46%) is water. The community lies at the southeastern end of Beaver Dam Lake. Most of this land is dedicated to agriculture. Rolling hills and fertile plains define the local topography, a result of glacial movements thousands of years ago.

== Transportation ==
US Route 151 passes through Beaver Dam.

== Demographics ==
At the 2020 census, there were 4,062 people, 1,757 households, and 1,643 families residing in the town. The population density was 100.4 per square mile (38.8/km^{2}). There were 1,375 housing units at an average density of 110 per square mile (42/km^{2}). The racial make-up of the town was 88.18% White, 0.51% Black or African American, 0.17% Native American, 0.96% Asian, 1.95% from other races and 7.4% from two or more races. 8.83% of the population were Hispanic or Latino of any race.

There were 1,757 households, of which 16.8% had children under the age of 18 living with them, 52.7% were married couples living together, 17.7% had a female householder with no husband present, and 24.8% were non-families. 20.1% of all households were made up of individuals and 7.8% had someone living alone who was 65 years of age or older. The average household size was 2.64 and the average family size was 3.07.

27.1% of the population were under the age of 18, 5.6% from 18 to 24, 28.1% from 25 to 44, 27.8% from 45 to 64 and 11.5% were 65 years of age or older. The median age was 39 years. For every 100 females, there were 102.4 males. For every 100 females age 18 and over, there were 100.8 males.

The median household income was $82,925, and the median family income was $81,627. Males had a median income of $39,527 and females $22,462. The per capita income was $21,541. About 4.5% of families and 5.2% of the population were below the poverty line, including 9.9% of those under age 18 and 7.3% of those age 65 or over.
