= Dodge County, Wisconsin =

County in Wisconsin, United States

- County
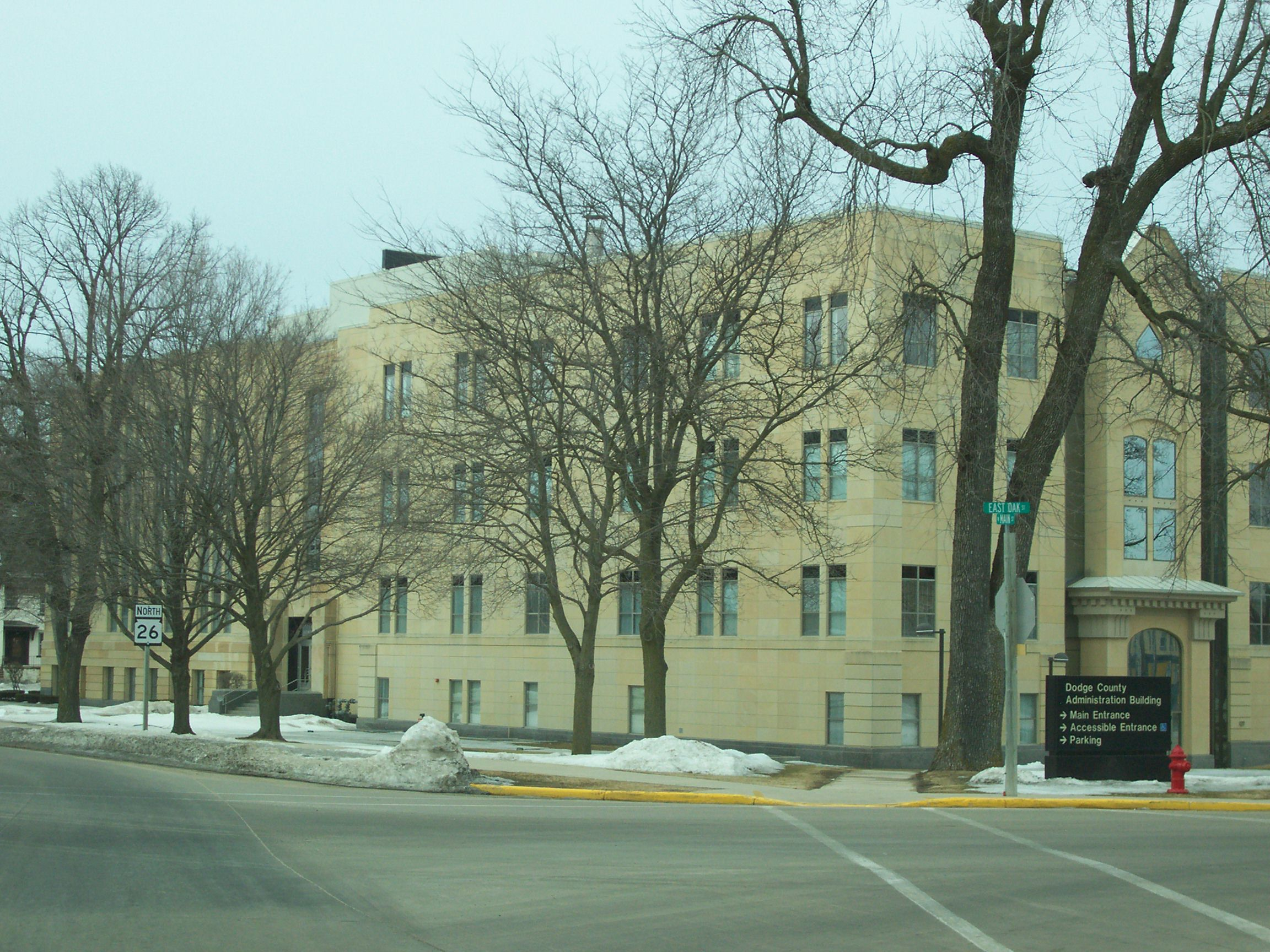
- Dodge County Administration building

- Location within the U.S. state of Wisconsin
- Coordinates: 43°25′N 88°43′W
- Country: United States
- State: Wisconsin
- Founded: 1844
- Named for: Henry Dodge
- Seat: Juneau
- Largest city: Beaver Dam

Area
  - Total: 907 sq mi (2,350 km^{2})
  - Land: 876 sq mi (2,270 km^{2})
  - Water: 31 sq mi (80 km^{2}) 3.5%

Population (2020)
  - Total: 89,396
  - Estimate (2025): 89,097 ▼
  - Density: 102.1/sq mi (39.4/km^{2})
- Time zone: UTC−6 (Central)
  - Summer (DST): UTC−5 (CDT)
- Congressional districts: 5th, 6th
- Website: www.co.dodge.wi.gov

Dodge County is a county located in the U.S. state of Wisconsin. As of the 2020 census, the population was 89,396. Its county seat is Juneau. The county was created from the Wisconsin Territory in 1836 and organized in 1844.

Dodge County comprises the Beaver Dam, WI Micropolitan Statistical Area, which is included in the Milwaukee–Racine–Waukesha, WI Combined Statistical Area.

== Geography ==
According to the U.S. Census Bureau, the county has a total area of 907 square miles (2,350 km^{2}), of which 876 square miles (2,270 km^{2}) is land and 31 square miles (80 km^{2}) (3.5%) is water.

The 6,718 acre Beaver Dam Lake and the 2,713 acre Fox Lake are found within the county.

=== Adjacent counties ===
- Fond du Lac County – northeast
- Washington County – east
- Waukesha County – southeast
- Jefferson County – south
- Dane County – southwest
- Columbia County – west
- Green Lake County – northwest

=== National protected area ===
- Horicon National Wildlife Refuge (part)

== Climate ==
Dodge County

Climate chart (precipitation, max. and min. temperature)
J	F	M	A	M	J	J	A	S	O	N	D
83 −7 −12	80 −5 −14	82 4 −7	160 17 3	122 22 6	163 26 15	91 25 17	95 24 17	75 21 11	107 15 6	62 7 −3	70 −3 −11
- █ Average max. and min. temperatures in °C
- █ Precipitation totals in mm
Imperial conversion
J	F	M	A	M	J	J	A	S	O	N	D
3.3 19 10	3.1 23 7	3.2 39 19	6.3 63 37	4.8 72 43	6.4 79 59	3.6 77 63	3.7 75 63	3 70 52	4.2 59 43	2.4 45 27	2.8 27 12
- █ Average max. and min. temperatures in °F
- █ Precipitation totals in inches

== Demographics ==
Historical population
Census	Pop.	Note	%±
1840	67		—
1850	19,138		28,464.2%
1860	42,818		123.7%
1870	47,035		9.8%
1880	45,931		−2.3%
1890	44,984		−2.1%
1900	46,631		3.7%
1910	47,436		1.7%
1920	49,742		4.9%
1930	52,092		4.7%
1940	54,280		4.2%
1950	57,611		6.1%
1960	63,170		9.6%
1970	69,004		9.2%
1980	75,064		8.8%
1990	76,559		2.0%
2000	85,897		12.2%
2010	88,759		3.3%
2020	89,396		0.7%
2025 (est.)	89,097	▼	−0.3%
U.S. Decennial Census; 1790–1960 1900–1990; 1990–2000 2010–2020

=== Racial and ethnic composition ===
Dodge County, Wisconsin – Racial and ethnic composition Note: the US Census treats Hispanic/Latino as an ethnic category. This table excludes Latinos from the racial categories and assigns them to a separate category. Hispanics/Latinos may be of any race.
Race / Ethnicity (NH = Non-Hispanic)	Pop 1980	Pop 1990	Pop 2000	Pop 2010	Pop 2020	% 1980	% 1990	% 2000	% 2010	% 2020
White alone (NH)	73,199	74,131	80,563	81,325	77,845	97.52%	96.83%	93.79%	91.62%	87.08%
Black or African American alone (NH)	822	1,113	2,095	2,361	2,701	1.10%	1.45%	2.44%	2.66%	3.02%
Native American or Alaska Native alone (NH)	149	209	322	369	371	0.20%	0.27%	0.37%	0.42%	0.42%
Asian alone (NH)	151	185	293	460	511	0.20%	0.24%	0.34%	0.52%	0.57%
Native Hawaiian or Pacific Islander alone (NH)	x	x	25	39	11	x	x	0.03%	0.04%	0.01%
Other race alone (NH)	66	10	29	23	204	0.09%	0.01%	0.03%	0.03%	0.23%
Mixed race or Multiracial (NH)	x	x	382	660	2,263	x	x	0.44%	0.74%	2.53%
Hispanic or Latino (any race)	677	911	2,188	3,522	5,490	0.90%	1.19%	2.55%	3.97%	6.14%
Total	75,064	76,559	85,897	88,759	89,396	100.00%	100.00%	100.00%	100.00%	100.00%

=== 2020 census ===
As of the 2020 census, the county had a population of 89,396 and a population density of 102.1 people per square mile (39.4 people/km^{2}).

The median age was 43.3 years. 19.9% of residents were under the age of 18 and 19.0% of residents were 65 years of age or older. For every 100 females there were 112.2 males, and for every 100 females age 18 and over there were 113.4 males age 18 and over.

The racial makeup of the county was 88.8% White, 3.1% Black or African American, 0.5% American Indian and Alaska Native, 0.6% Asian, <0.1% Native Hawaiian and Pacific Islander, 2.4% from some other race, and 4.6% from two or more races. Hispanic or Latino residents of any race comprised 6.1% of the population.

45.1% of residents lived in urban areas, while 54.9% lived in rural areas.

There were 35,437 households in the county, of which 26.4% had children under the age of 18 living in them. Of all households, 50.3% were married-couple households, 19.6% were households with a male householder and no spouse or partner present, and 21.8% were households with a female householder and no spouse or partner present. About 28.7% of all households were made up of individuals and 12.6% had someone living alone who was 65 years of age or older.

There were 38,123 housing units at an average density of 43.5 units per square mile (16.8 units/km^{2}), of which 7.0% were vacant. Among occupied housing units, 71.0% were owner-occupied and 29.0% were renter-occupied. The homeowner vacancy rate was 1.1% and the rental vacancy rate was 5.6%.

2000 Census Age Pyramid for Dodge County

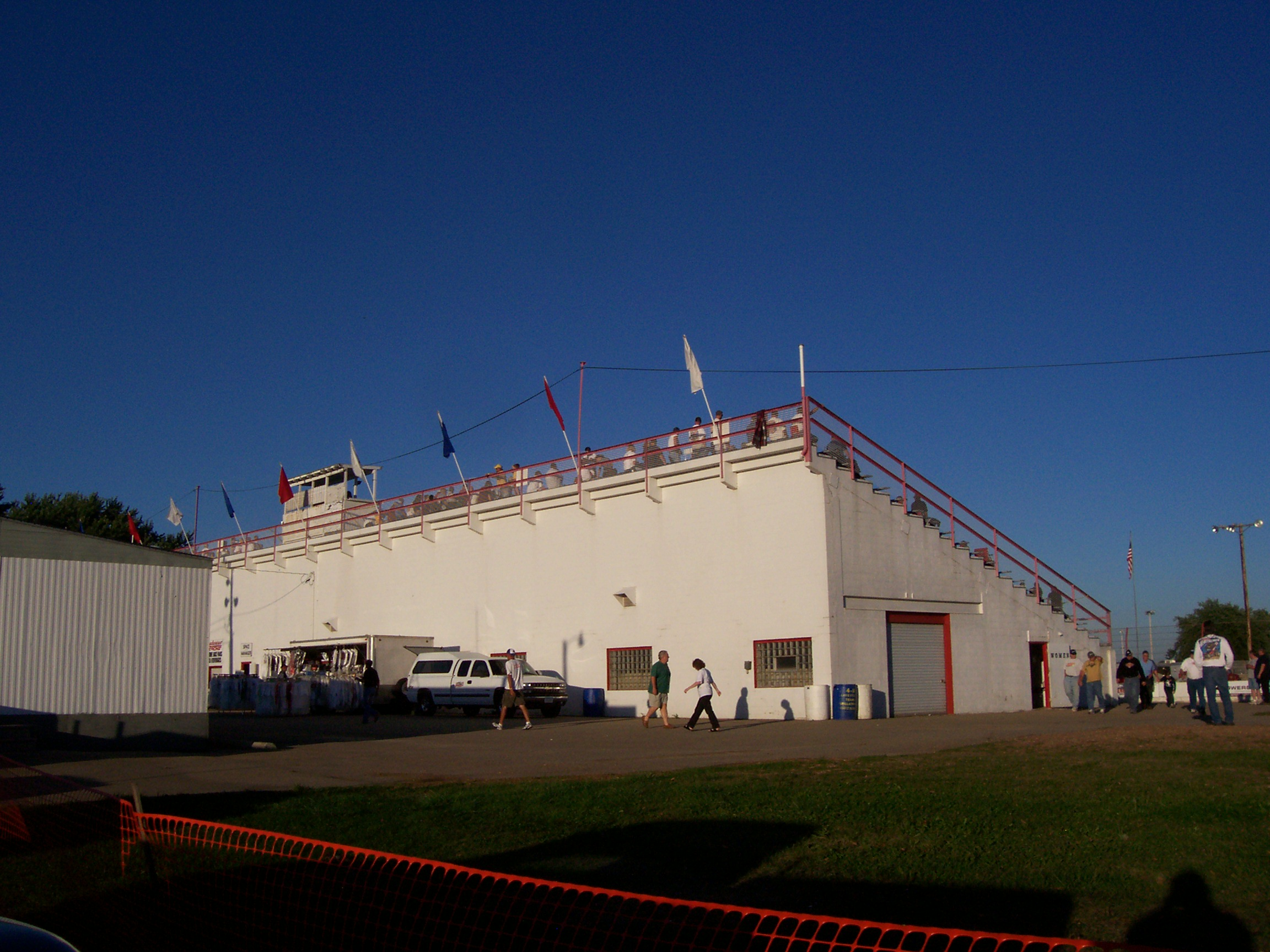
Dodge County Fairgrounds

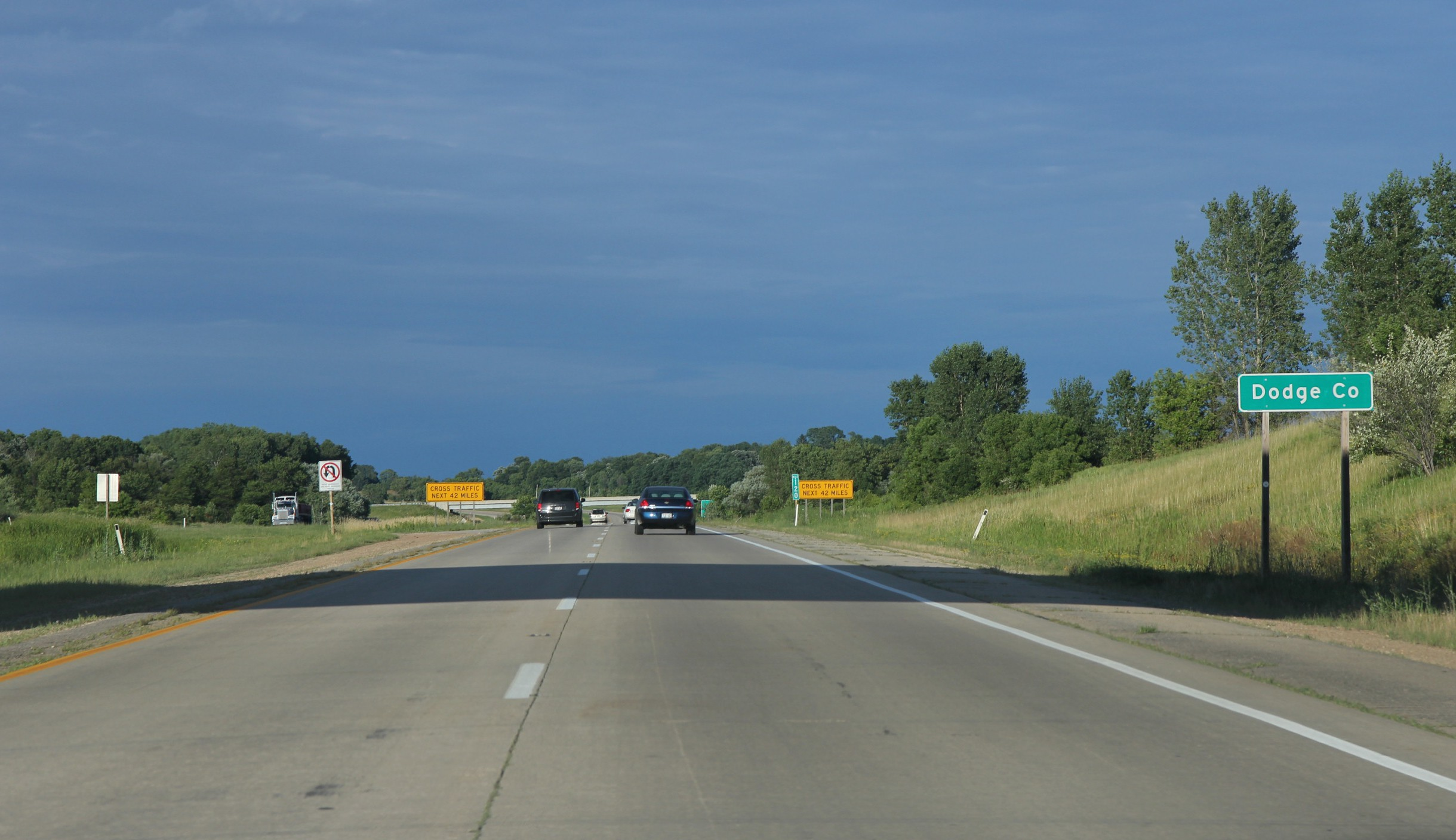
Entering Dodge County on US 151

=== 2000 census ===
As of the census of 2000, there were 85,897 people, 31,417 households, and 22,313 families residing in the county. The population density was 97 people per square mile (37 people/km^{2}). There were 33,672 housing units at an average density of 38 units per square mile (15 units/km^{2}). The racial makeup of the county was 95.28% White, 2.49% Black or African American, 0.40% Native American, 0.34% Asian, 0.03% Pacific Islander, 0.87% from other races, and 0.58% from two or more races. 2.55% of the population were Hispanic or Latino of any race. Ancestry-wise, 56.2% were of German, 8.7% Irish, 5.0% English, 4.2% Norwegian and 3.9% selected "United States or American" ancestry. 95.4% spoke English, 2.2% Spanish and 2.0% other Indo-European languages as their language spoken at home.

There were 31,417 households, out of which 33.90% had children under the age of 18 living with them, 59.60% were married couples living together, 7.50% had a female householder with no husband present, and 29.00% were non-families. 24.10% of all households were made up of individuals, and 10.80% had someone living alone who was 65 years of age or older. The average household size was 2.56 and the average family size was 3.05.

In the county, the population was spread out, with 24.80% under the age of 18, 8.30% from 18 to 24, 31.20% from 25 to 44, 21.90% from 45 to 64, and 14.00% who were 65 years of age or older. The median age was 37 years. For every 100 females there were 109.70 males. For every 100 females age 18 and over, there were 110.80 males.

In 2017, there were 758 births, giving a general fertility rate of 54.0 births per 1000 women aged 15–44, the 12th lowest rate out of all 72 Wisconsin counties.

== Transportation ==
=== Major highways ===
- Interstate 41
- U.S. Highway 41
- U.S. Highway 151
- Highway 16
- Highway 19
- Highway 26
- Highway 28
- Highway 33
- Highway 49
- Highway 60
- Highway 67
- Highway 68
- Highway 73
- Highway 89
- Highway 175

=== Railroads ===
- Amtrak
- Canadian National
- Canadian Pacific
- Union Pacific
- Wisconsin and Southern Railroad

=== Airport ===
- Dodge County Airport (KUNU) serves the county and surrounding communities.

== Communities ==
=== Cities ===
- Beaver Dam
- Columbus (mostly in Columbia County)
- Fox Lake
- Hartford (part; mostly in Washington County)
- Horicon
- Juneau (county seat)
- Mayville
- Watertown (mostly in Jefferson County)
- Waupun (partly in Fond du Lac County)

=== Villages ===
- Brownsville
- Clyman
- Hustisford
- Iron Ridge
- Kekoskee
- Lomira
- Lowell
- Neosho
- Randolph (partly in Columbia County)
- Reeseville
- Theresa

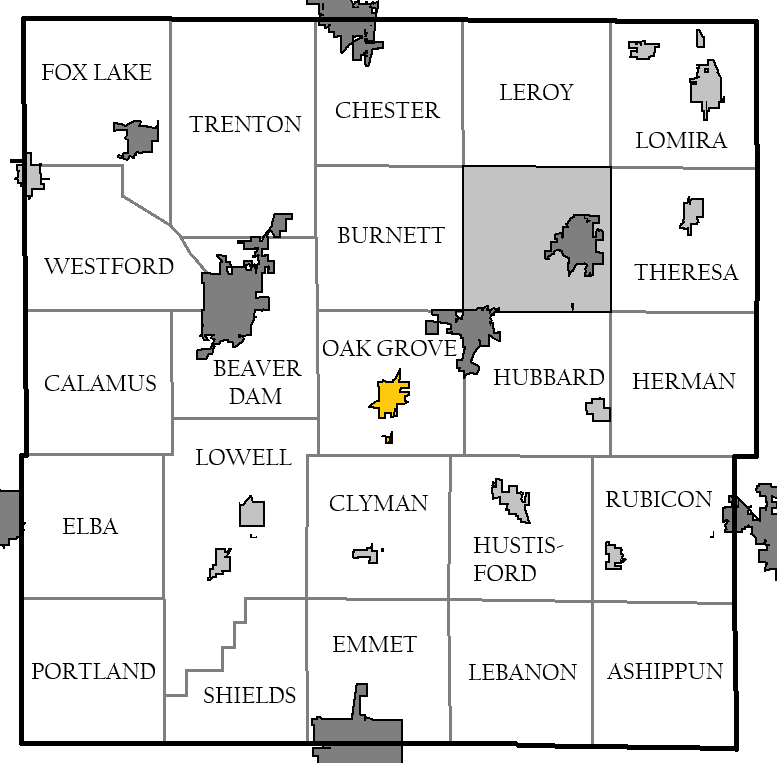
Towns of Dodge County

=== Towns ===
- Ashippun
- Beaver Dam
- Burnett
- Calamus
- Chester
- Clyman
- Elba
- Emmet
- Fox Lake
- Herman
- Hubbard
- Hustisford
- Iron Ridge
- Lebanon
- LeRoy
- Lomira
- Lowell
- Oak Grove
- Portland
- Rubicon
- Shields
- Theresa
- Trenton
- Westford
- Williamstown (former)

=== Census-designated places ===
- Ashippun
- Burnett
- Lebanon
- Rubicon

=== Unincorporated communities ===
- Alderley
- Astico
- Atwater
- Beaver Edge
- Clyman Junction
- Danville
- Delbern Acres
- East Waupun
- Farmersville
- Fox Lake Junction
- Herman Center
- Hochheim
- Huilsburg
- Knowles
- LeRoy
- Leipsig
- Lost Lake
- Lyndon Dale
- Minnesota Junction
- Nasbro
- Neda
- North Lowell
- Oak Grove
- Old Ashippun
- Old Lebanon
- Portland (partial)
- Richwood
- Rolling Prairie
- Saylesville
- South Beaver Dam
- South Randolph
- Sugar Island
- Sunset Beach
- Theresa Station
- Woodland

=== Ghost town ===
- Clason Prairie

== Gallery ==
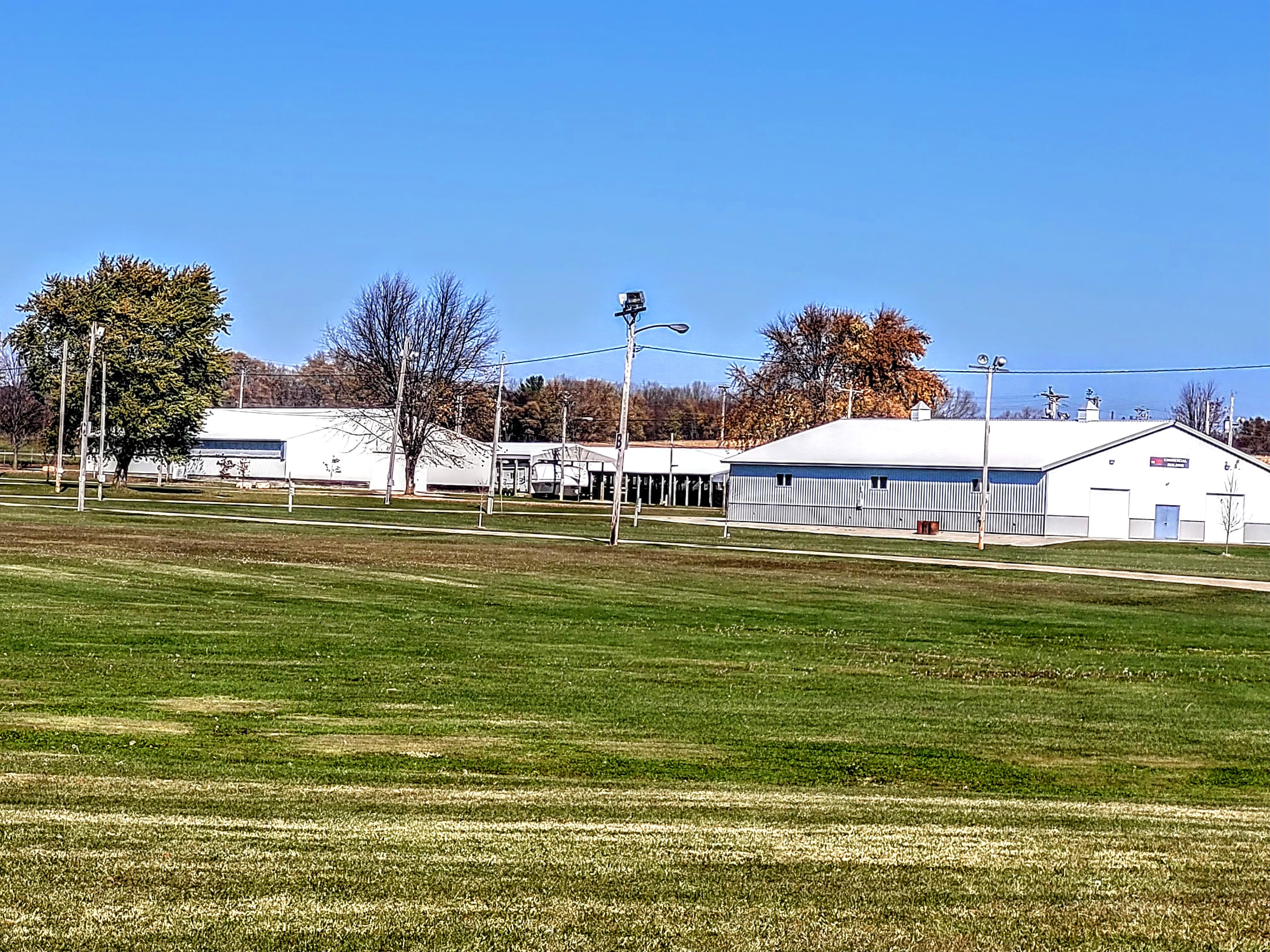
Dodge County Fairgrounds

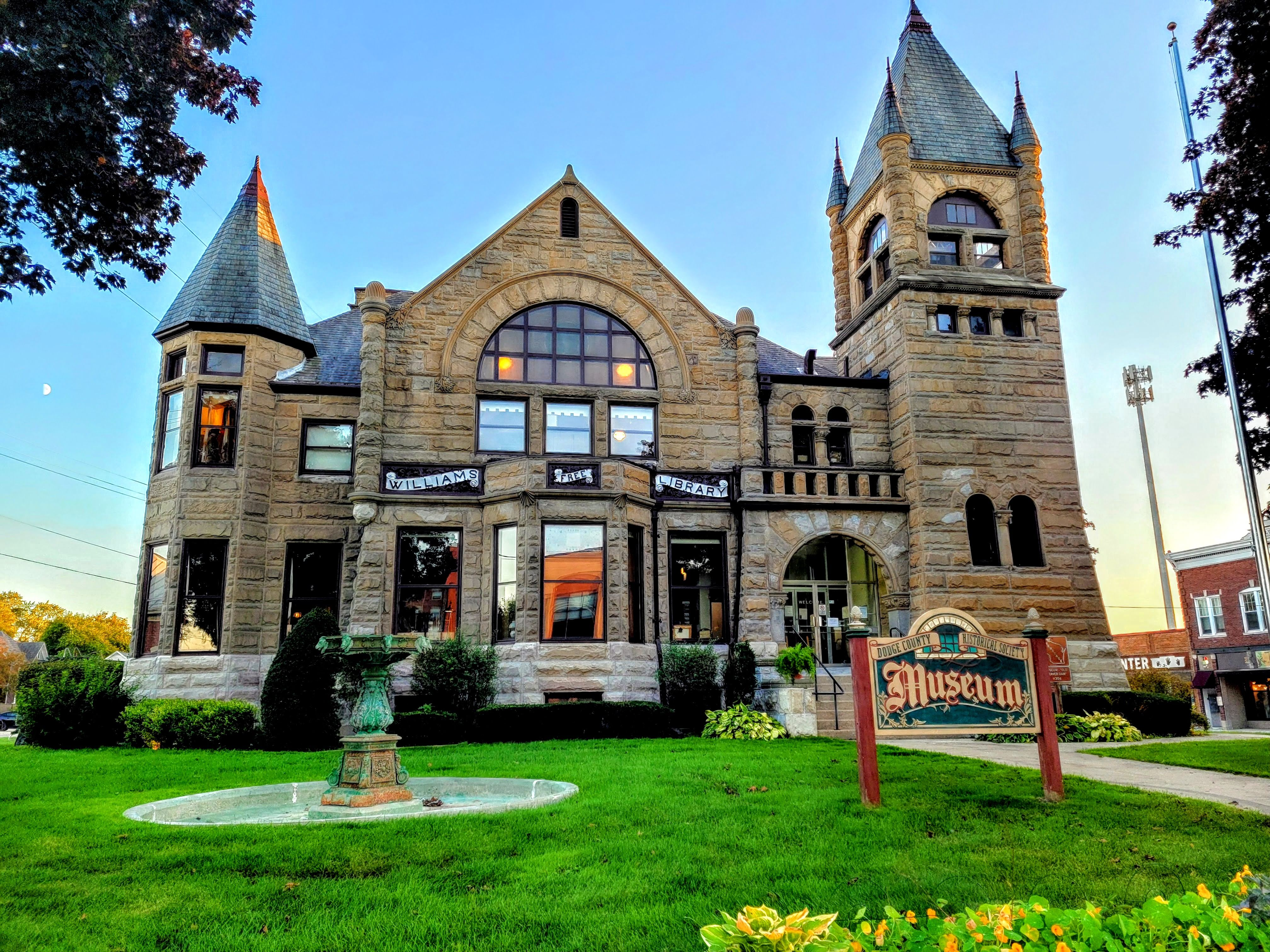
Dodge County Historical Society

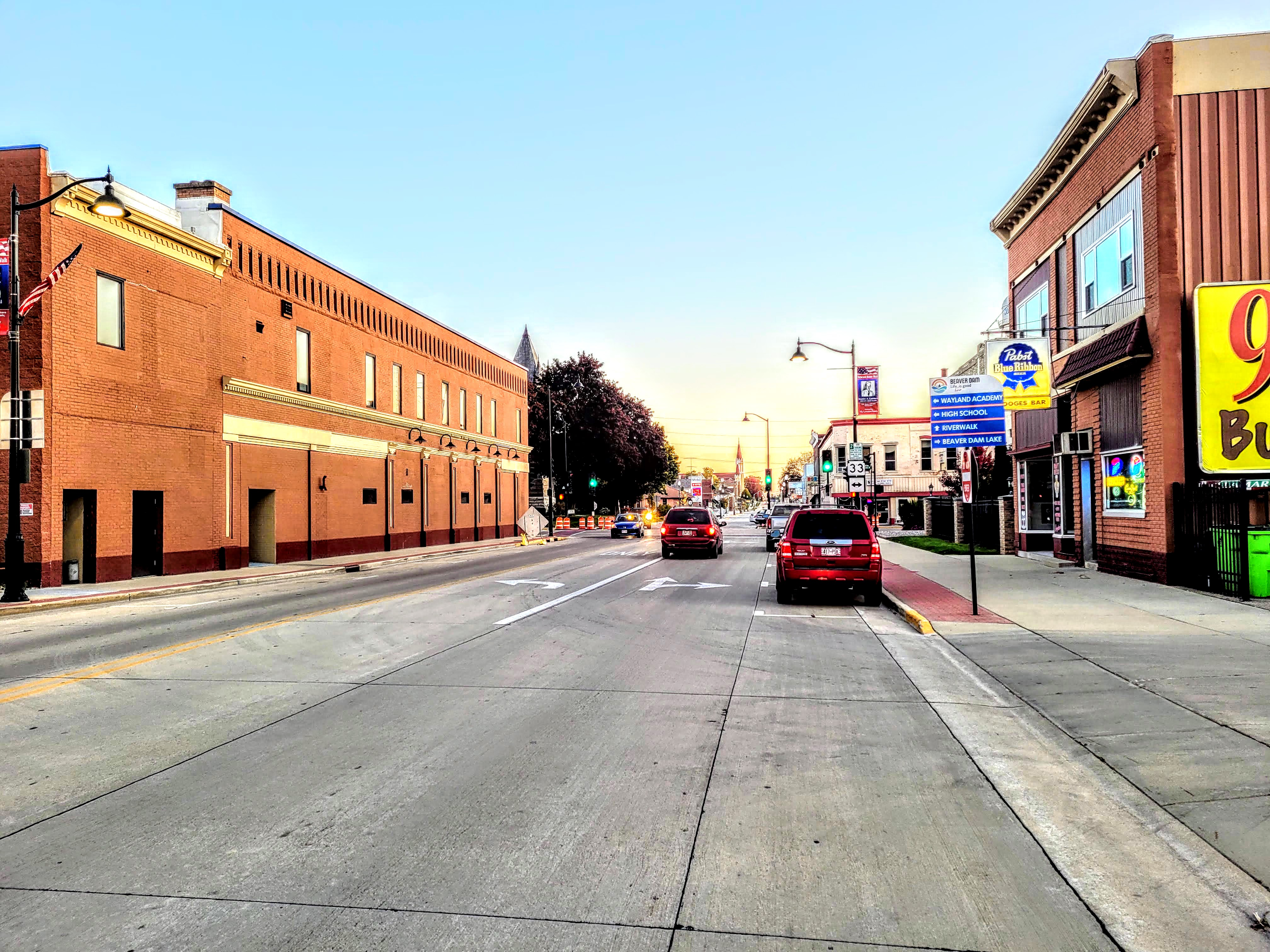
Downtown Beaver Dam, Wisconsin

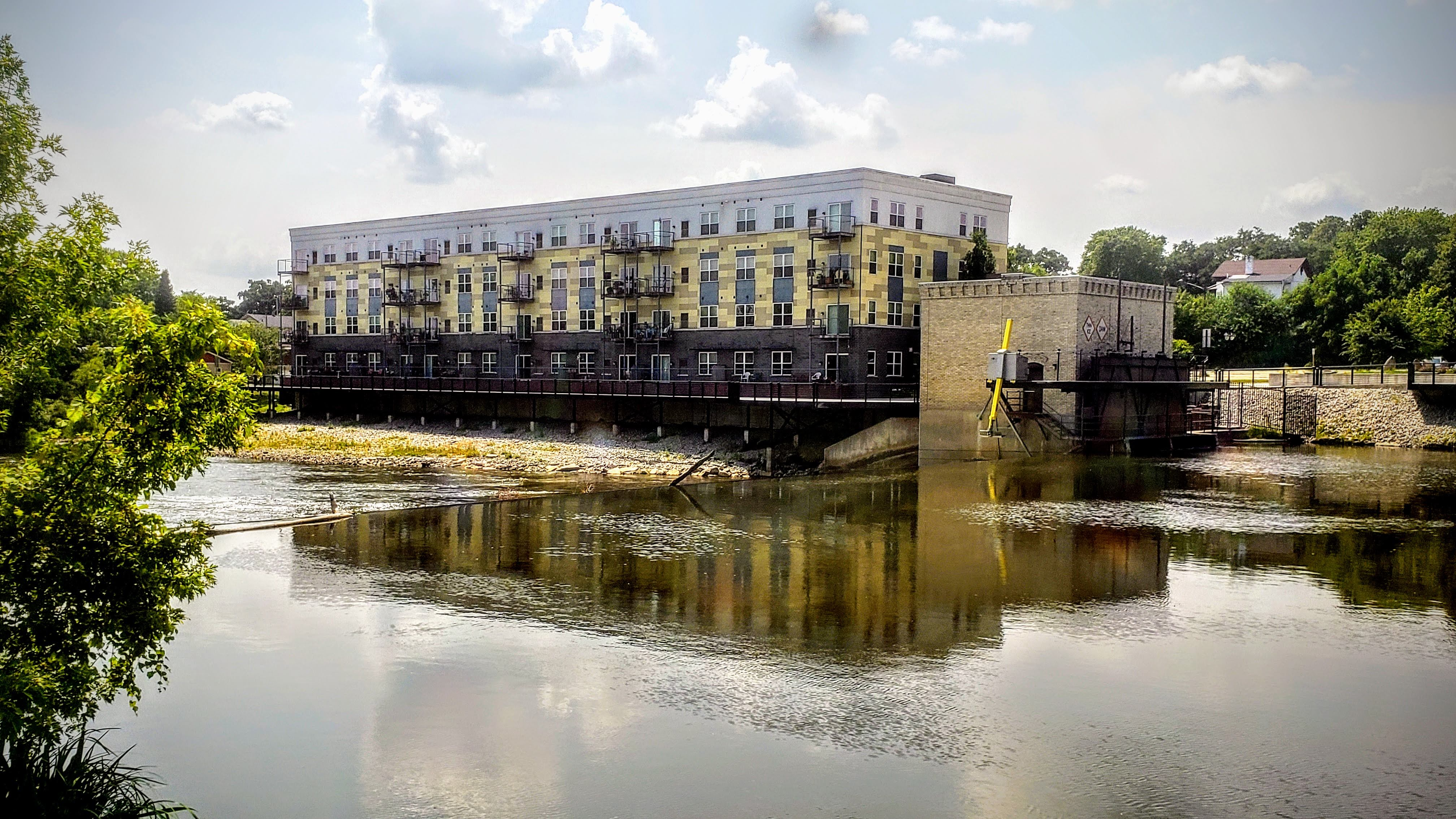
Watertown Riverwalk

== Politics ==
United States presidential election results for Dodge County, Wisconsin
Year	Republican		Democratic		Third party(ies)	
Year	No.	%	No.	%	No.	%
1892	2,653	27.33%	6,810	70.14%	246	2.53%
1896	5,610	51.55%	4,900	45.03%	372	3.42%
1900	4,780	44.35%	5,813	53.93%	185	1.72%
1904	4,248	44.91%	5,005	52.91%	206	2.18%
1908	4,015	39.66%	5,883	58.12%	225	2.22%
1912	2,559	29.26%	5,246	59.97%	942	10.77%
1916	4,887	50.66%	4,519	46.85%	240	2.49%
1920	11,354	77.46%	2,293	15.64%	1,011	6.90%
1924	5,167	30.45%	2,019	11.90%	9,785	57.66%
1928	9,660	49.71%	9,536	49.07%	238	1.22%
1932	4,936	23.34%	15,874	75.06%	338	1.60%
1936	6,829	30.22%	14,782	65.41%	988	4.37%
1940	14,651	61.41%	8,948	37.50%	260	1.09%
1944	14,102	64.44%	7,667	35.04%	114	0.52%
1948	10,831	56.15%	8,212	42.58%	245	1.27%
1952	19,298	73.28%	7,001	26.58%	37	0.14%
1956	17,569	72.10%	6,704	27.51%	93	0.38%
1960	17,152	62.84%	10,113	37.05%	30	0.11%
1964	10,772	40.95%	15,497	58.91%	39	0.15%
1968	14,909	57.88%	8,948	34.74%	1,901	7.38%
1972	17,068	61.54%	9,898	35.69%	771	2.78%
1976	17,335	54.79%	13,643	43.12%	663	2.10%
1980	19,435	57.70%	11,966	35.53%	2,281	6.77%
1984	20,458	64.41%	11,052	34.80%	251	0.79%
1988	17,003	56.81%	12,663	42.31%	261	0.87%
1992	14,971	41.93%	11,438	32.03%	9,300	26.04%
1996	12,890	43.81%	12,625	42.91%	3,907	13.28%
2000	21,684	57.52%	14,580	38.67%	1,437	3.81%
2004	27,201	61.35%	16,690	37.64%	445	1.00%
2008	23,015	53.74%	19,183	44.80%	625	1.46%
2012	25,211	56.67%	18,762	42.17%	515	1.16%
2016	26,635	61.83%	13,968	32.42%	2,475	5.75%
2020	31,355	64.73%	16,356	33.77%	725	1.50%
2024	33,067	65.74%	16,518	32.84%	715	1.42%

Since 1940, Dodge County has been a Republican stronghold in presidential elections. It has voted Republican in every election in that span with the exception of the 1964 landslide victory of Democrat Lyndon B. Johnson. Only six other times in that span has the Democratic candidate obtained at least 40% of the vote. In 2024, Donald Trump received over 65% of the vote in Dodge County, the best Republican performance since the 1956 landslide reelection of Dwight D. Eisenhower.

Historically, Dodge County had been a major stronghold of the Democratic Party in Wisconsin, from the establishment of the state, in 1848, until the 1910s, when a combination of World War I and the rise of the progressive faction of Republicans began to eat into the Democratic vote in the county. A significant factor in the switch was the anti-war attitude among the county's large German American population. Democratic president Woodrow Wilson and Wisconsin's Democratic U.S. senator Paul O. Husting (who was actually from Dodge County) supported the declaration of war against Germany in 1917, while progressive Republican leader Robert M. La Follette was one of only six senators who voted against the resolution. In the next presidential election, Dodge County gave 77% of its votes to the Republican nominee—the largest majority the county has given to either party in the last 130 years.

== Education ==
K-12 school districts include:

- Beaver Dam Unified School District
- Columbus School District
- Dodgeland School District
- Fall River School District
- Horicon School District
- Hustisford School District
- Lomira School District
- Markesan School District
- Mayville School District
- Oakfield School District
- Oconomowoc Area School District
- Randolph School District
- Waterloo School District
- Watertown Unified School District
- Waupun School District

There are also two elementary school districts: Herman-Neosho-Rubicon School District and Hartford Joint No. 1 School District, and one secondary school district, Hartford Union High School District.

== See also ==
- National Register of Historic Places listings in Dodge County, Wisconsin
