= Wisconsin's Dodge County 4th Assembly district =

Former American legislative district

Wisconsin's Dodge County 4th State Assembly district
- Obsolete
- Notes: 1848–1888

Wisconsin's Dodge County 4th Assembly district was a district in the Wisconsin State Assembly for several years in the early history of the state of Wisconsin, prior to the legislative redistricting reforms of 1972 which created the current numbered districts. Located in central Wisconsin, the district was one of the 66 original Assembly districts defined in Article XIV of the Constitution of Wisconsin. The Constitution originally allocated five districts for Dodge County, Wisconsin; this district originally comprised the southwest quadrant of Dodge County.

The district was in use for the first 38 years of Wisconsin's history, from 1848 to 1886.

== List of representatives ==
List of representatives from the Dodge County 4th district
Member	Party	Residence	Term start	Term end	Leg.
District created
Stephen Jones	Whig	Lowell	June 5, 1848	January 1, 1849	1st
Jedediah Kimball	Dem.	Portland	January 1, 1849	January 7, 1850	2nd
John Lowth	Dem.	Lowell	January 7, 1850	January 5, 1852	3rd 4th
William H. Green	Dem.	Lowell	January 5, 1852	January 3, 1853	5th
Patrick Kelly	Dem.	Elba	January 3, 1853	January 2, 1854	6th
Ruel Parker	Dem.	Portland	January 2, 1854	January 1, 1855	7th
John D. Griffin	Dem.	Shields	January 1, 1855	January 7, 1856	8th
Fred H. Ehinger	Dem.	Clyman	January 7, 1856	January 5, 1857	9th
Quartus H. Barron	Rep.	Fox Lake	January 5, 1857	January 4, 1858	10th
Benjamin F. Gibbs	Rep.	Fox Lake	January 4, 1858	January 3, 1859	11th
Cyrus Kneeland	Rep.	Waupun	January 3, 1859	January 2, 1860	12th
Stoddard Judd	Rep.	Fox Lake	January 2, 1860	January 7, 1861	13th
George W. Bly	Rep.	Waupun	January 7, 1861	January 6, 1862	14th
Jacob G. Mayer	Dem.	LeRoy	January 6, 1862	January 1, 1863	15th
Albert Burtch	Dem.	Mayville	January 1, 1863	January 4, 1864	16th
Max Bachhuber	Dem.	Farmersville	January 4, 1864	January 2, 1865	17th
Peter Peters	Dem.	Rubicon	January 2, 1865	January 1, 1866	18th
Jacob Bodden	Dem.	Theresa	January 1, 1866	January 7, 1867	19th
John Weatherby	Dem.	Hustisford	January 7, 1867	January 6, 1868	20th
George W. Colomy	Dem.	Alderley	January 6, 1868	January 4, 1869	21st
Eugene O'Connor	Dem.	Watertown	January 4, 1869	January 3, 1870	22nd
Henry Bertram	Ind.	Watertown	January 3, 1870	January 2, 1871	23rd
Marcus Trumer	Dem.	Rubicon	January 2, 1871	January 1, 1872	24th
Silas W. Lamoreux	Dem.	Lomira	January 1, 1872	January 6, 1873	25th
Dennis Short	Dem.	Medina	January 6, 1873	January 5, 1874	26th
Jacob Bodden	Dem.	Theresa	January 5, 1874	January 4, 1875	27th
Max Bachhuber	Dem.	Farmersville	January 4, 1875	January 3, 1876	28th
Charles E. Kite	Dem.	Mayville	January 3, 1876	January 1, 1877	29th
Patrick Roche	Dem.	Elba	January 1, 1877	January 7, 1878	30th
Edward C. McFetridge	Rep.	Beaver Dam	January 7, 1878	January 6, 1879	31st
William Geise	Dem.	Portland	January 6, 1879	January 5, 1880	32nd
Benjamin F. Sherman	Dem.	Beaver Dam	January 5, 1880	January 3, 1881	33rd
Edward C. McFetridge	Rep.	Beaver Dam	January 3, 1881	January 2, 1882	34th
Thomas J. Jones	Dem.	Beaver Dam	January 2, 1882	January 1, 1883	35th
Gustav Meissner	Dem.	Ashippun	January 1, 1883	January 5, 1885	36th
August Schoenwetter	Dem.	Lowell	January 5, 1885	January 3, 1887	37th
John F. Huebner	Ind.D.	Lowell	January 3, 1887	January 7, 1889	38th
District abolished by 1887 Wisconsin Act 461; Dodge County was consolidated into the Dodge 1st, Dodge 2nd, and Dodge 3rd Assembly districts
