= Wisconsin's 13th Senate district =

American legislative district in central Wisconsin

Wisconsin's 13th State Senate district
- 2024 map defined in 2023 Wisc. Act 94; 2022 map defined in Johnson v. Wisconsin Elections Commission; 2011 map was defined in 2011 Wisc. Act 43 composed of Assembly districts 37, 38, and 39
Senator
John Jagler; R–Watertown
since April 28, 2021 (4 years, 305 days)
- Demographics: 89.18% White; 2.81% Black; 5.03% Hispanic; 0.86% Asian; 1.57% Native American; 0.08% Hawaiian/Pacific Islander
- Population (2020) • Voting age: 178,652; 141,533
- Website: Official website
- Notes: Central Wisconsin

The 13th Senate district of Wisconsin is one of 33 districts in the Wisconsin Senate. Located in south central Wisconsin, the district comprises all of Green Lake and Marquette counties, along with most of Dodge County, western Fond du Lac County, and parts of northern Jefferson County, eastern Adams County, northeast Columbia County, and southwest Winnebago County. It includes the cities of Beaver Dam, Horicon, Markesan, Mayville, Montello, Princeton, Ripon, Watertown, and Waupun.

== Current elected officials ==
John Jagler is the senator representing the 13th district. He was first elected in a 2021 special election. He previously served 8 years in the State Assembly.

Each Wisconsin State Senate district is composed of three Wisconsin State Assembly districts. The 13th Senate district comprises the 37th, 38th, and 39th Assembly districts. The current representatives of those districts are:

- Assembly District 37: Mark Born (R–Beaver Dam)
- Assembly District 38: William Penterman (R–Hustisford)
- Assembly District 39: Alex Dallman (R–Markesan)

The 13th Senate district, in its current borders, crosses three different congressional districts. The part of the district in Adams County falls within Wisconsin's 3rd congressional district, represented by U.S. Representative Derrick Van Orden. The parts of the district in Jefferson County and the southern half of Dodge County fall within Wisconsin's 5th congressional district, represented by Scott L. Fitzgerald. All of the remainder falls within Wisconsin's 6th congressional district, represented by Glenn Grothman.

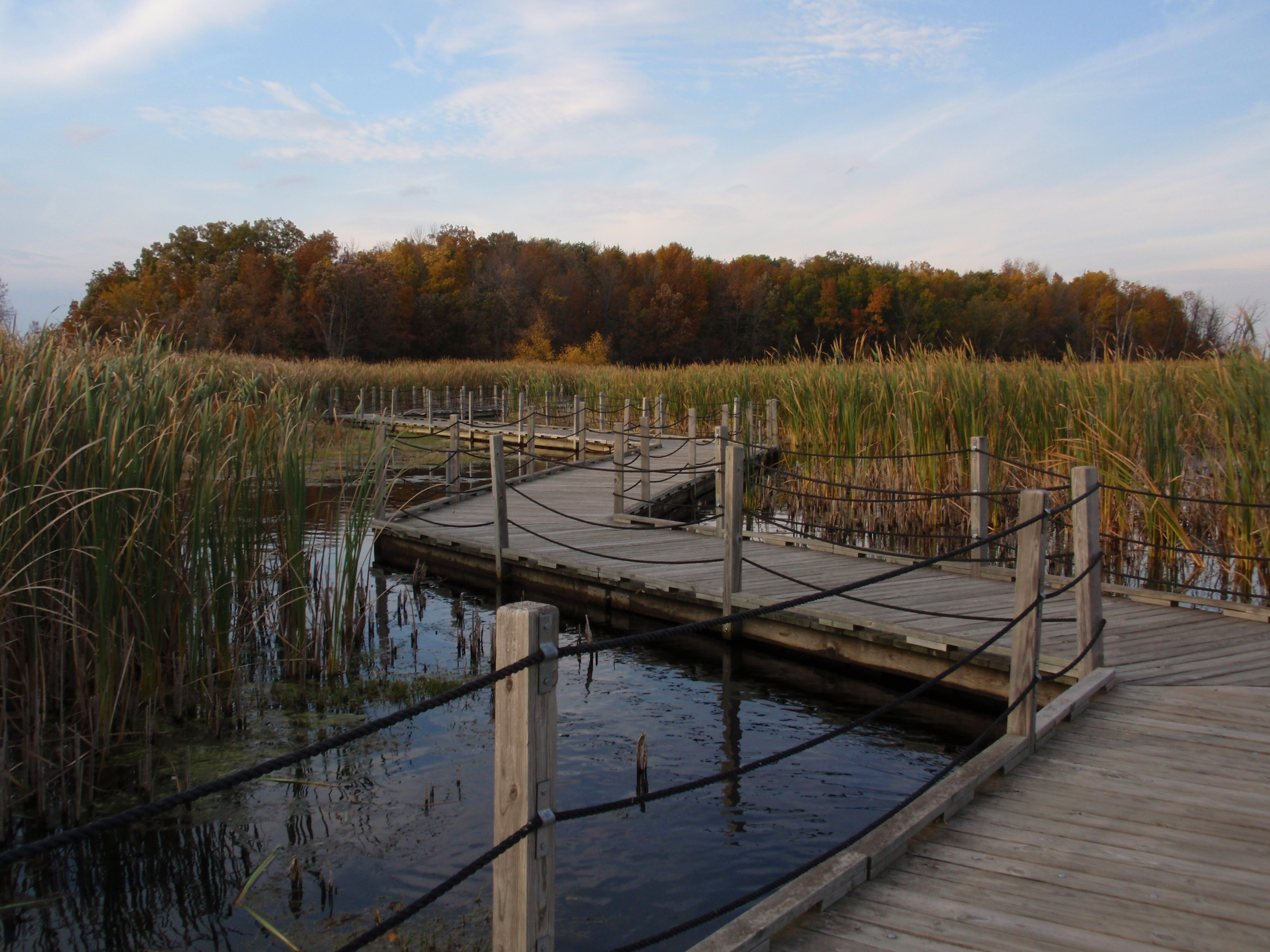
Path in the Horicon Marsh State Wildlife Area

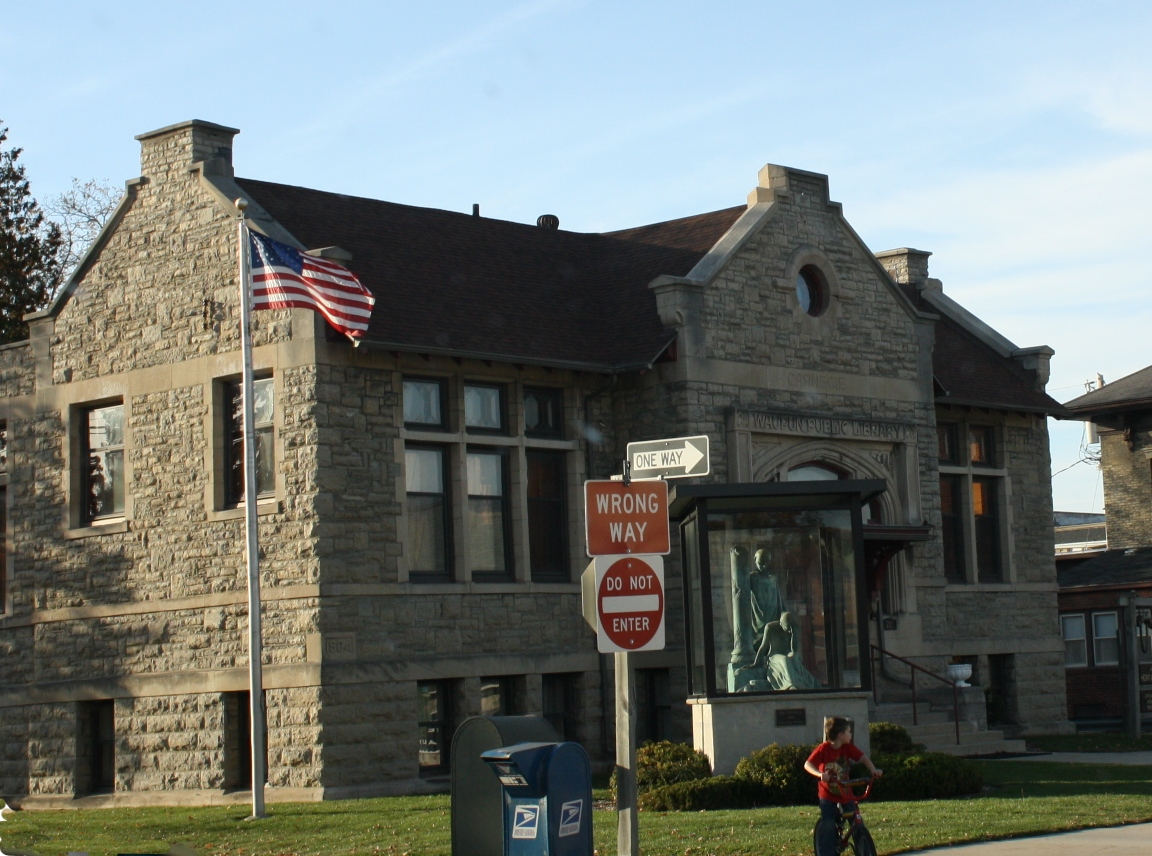
Historic Waupun Carnegie Library (now museum) in Waupun

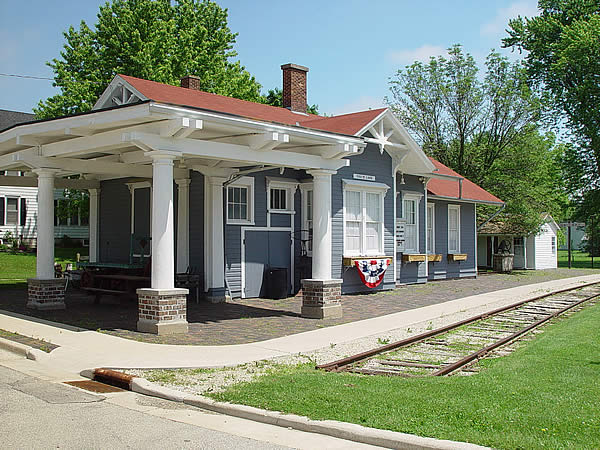
Fox Lake Railroad Depot

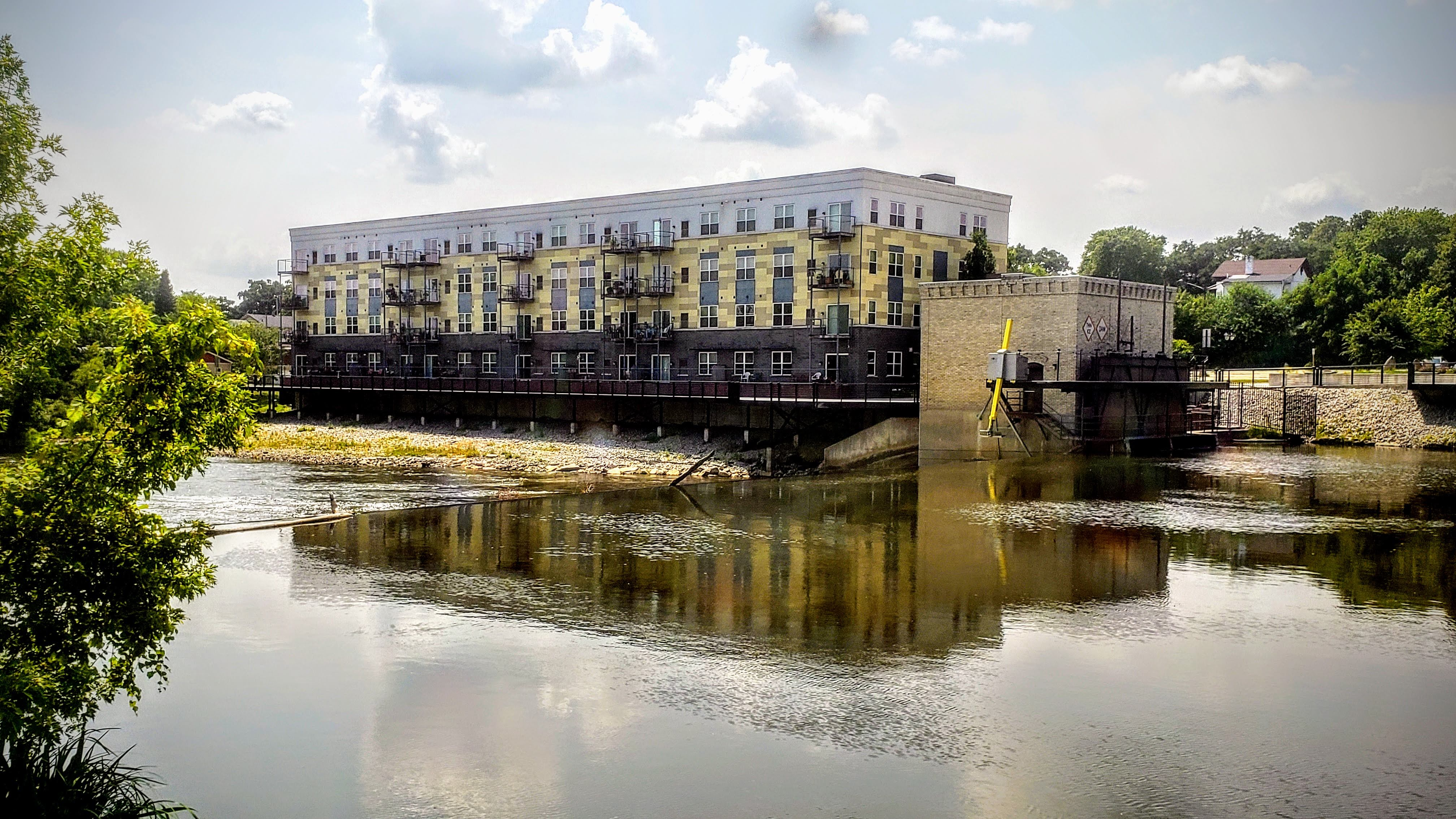
Watertown River Walk

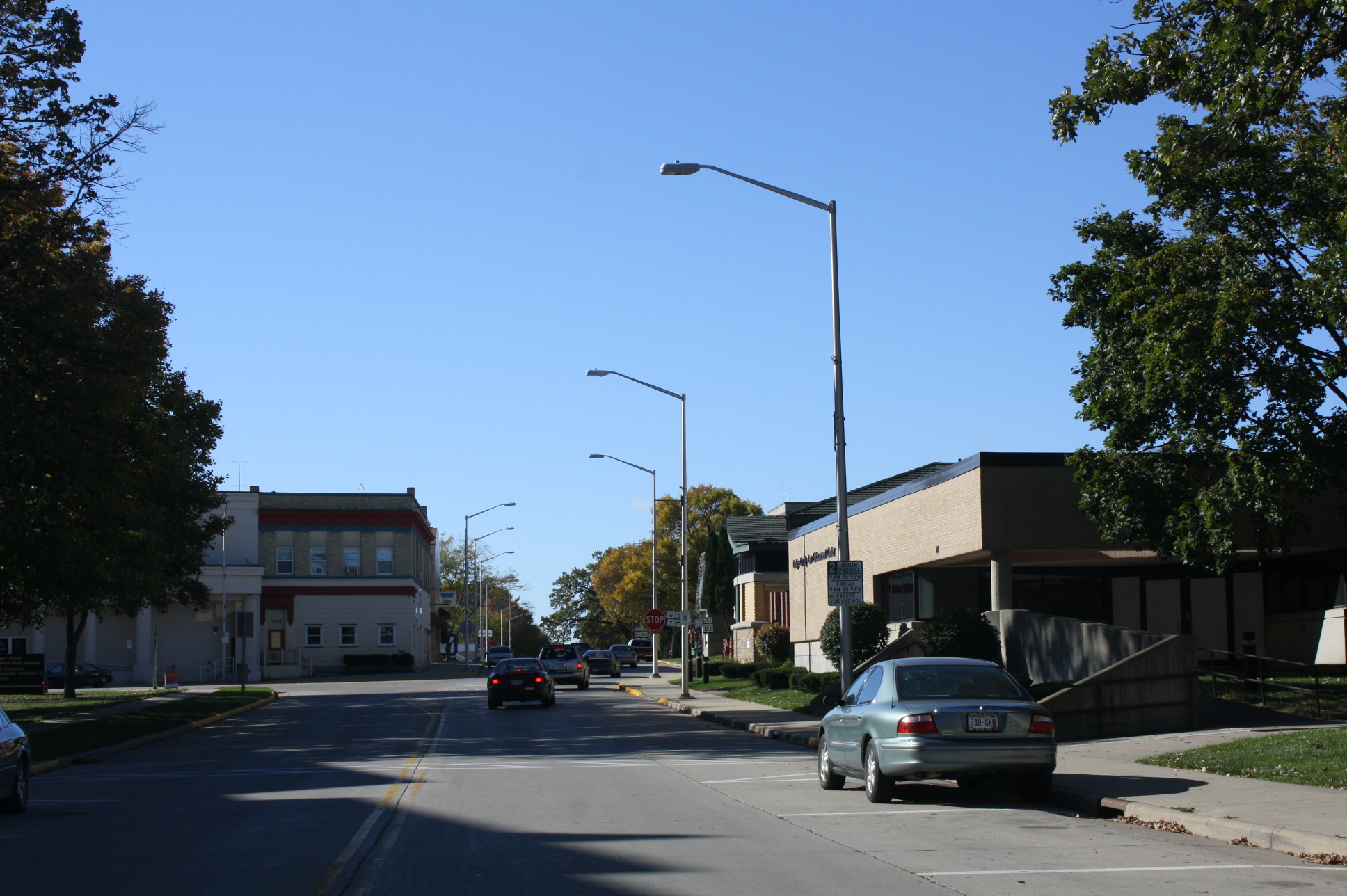
Downtown Juneau

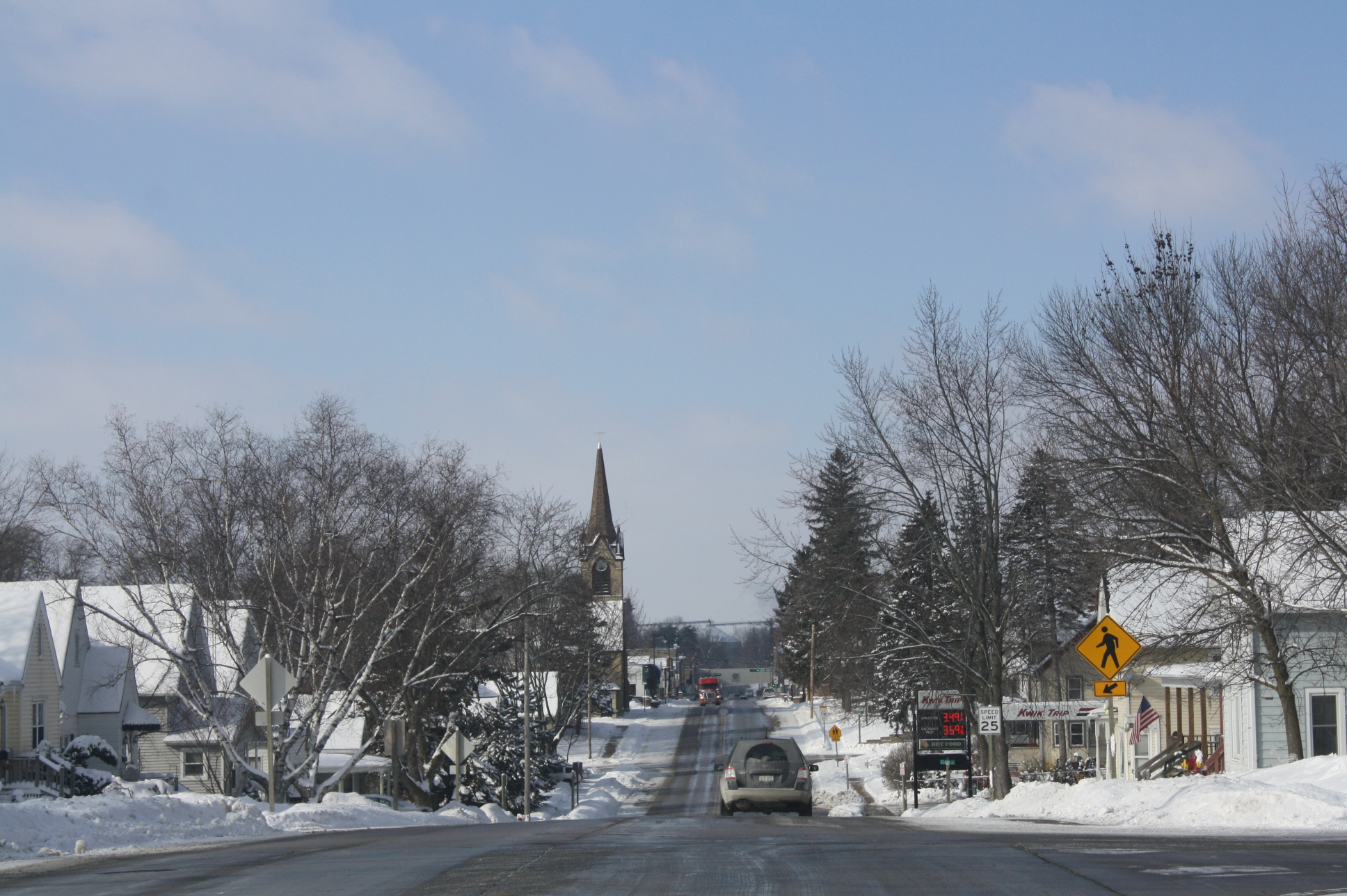
Downtown Horicon

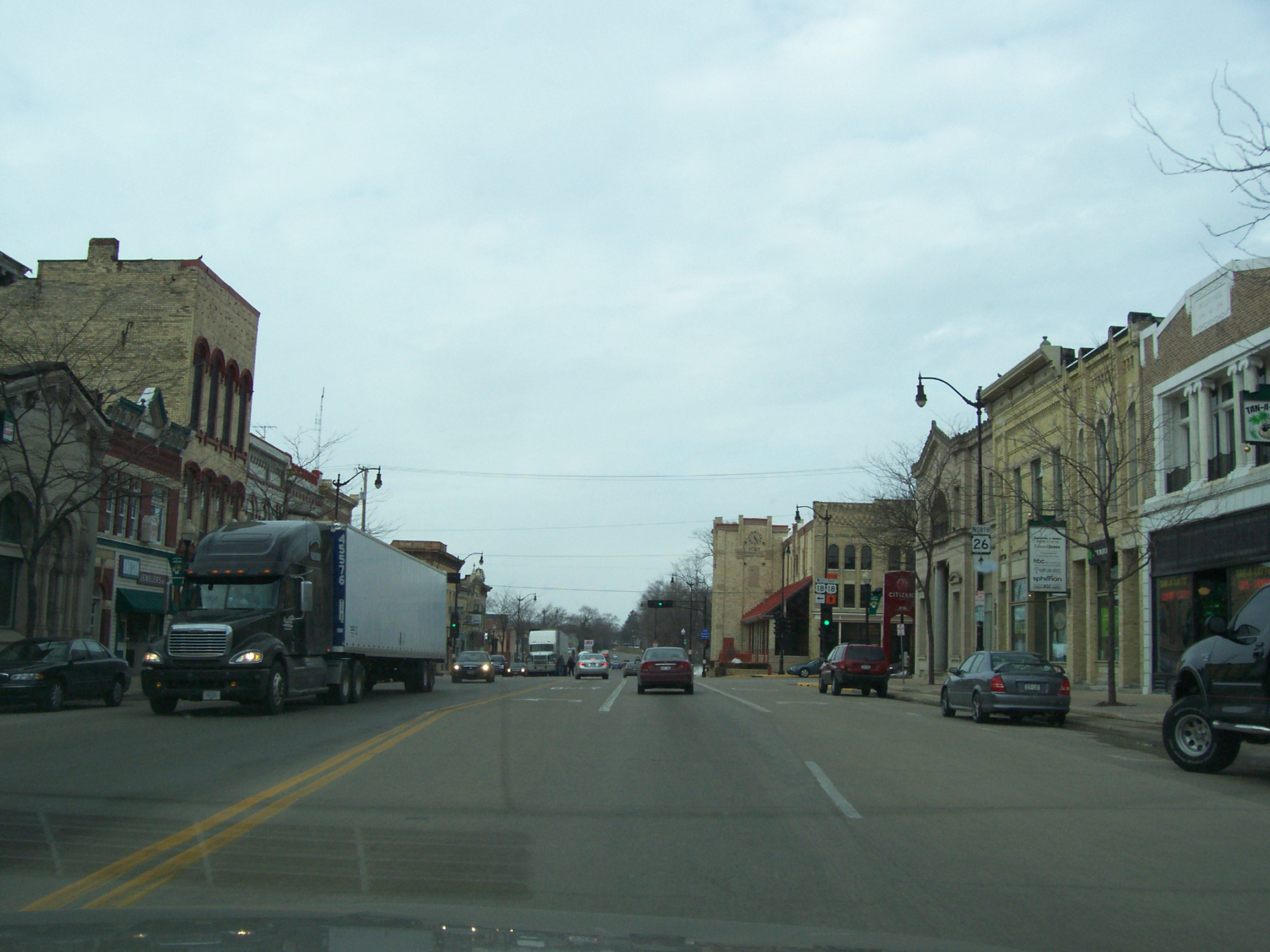
Downtown Jefferson

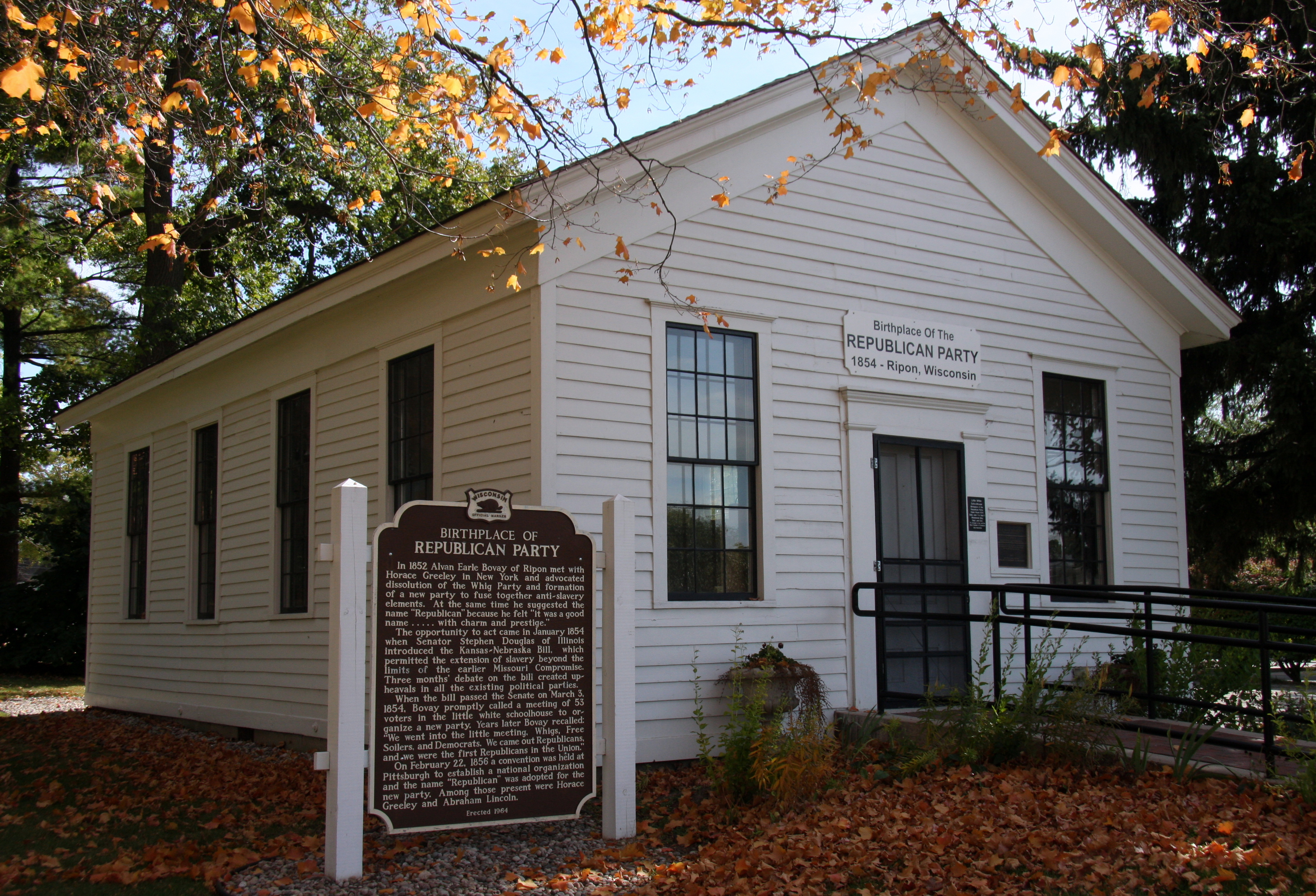
Little White Schoolhouse, birthplace of the Republican Party

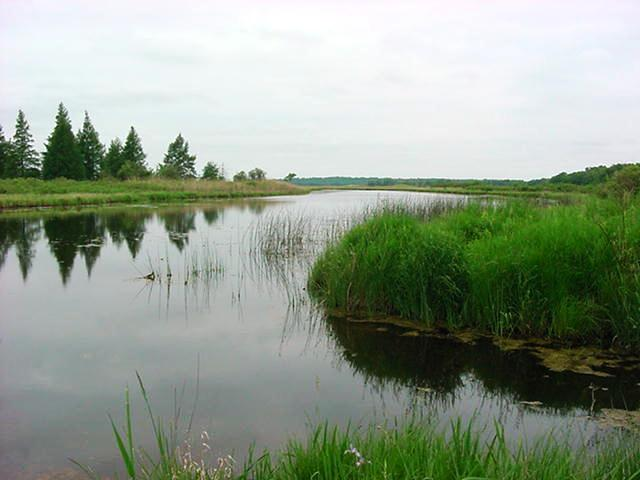
Fox River National Wildlife Refuge

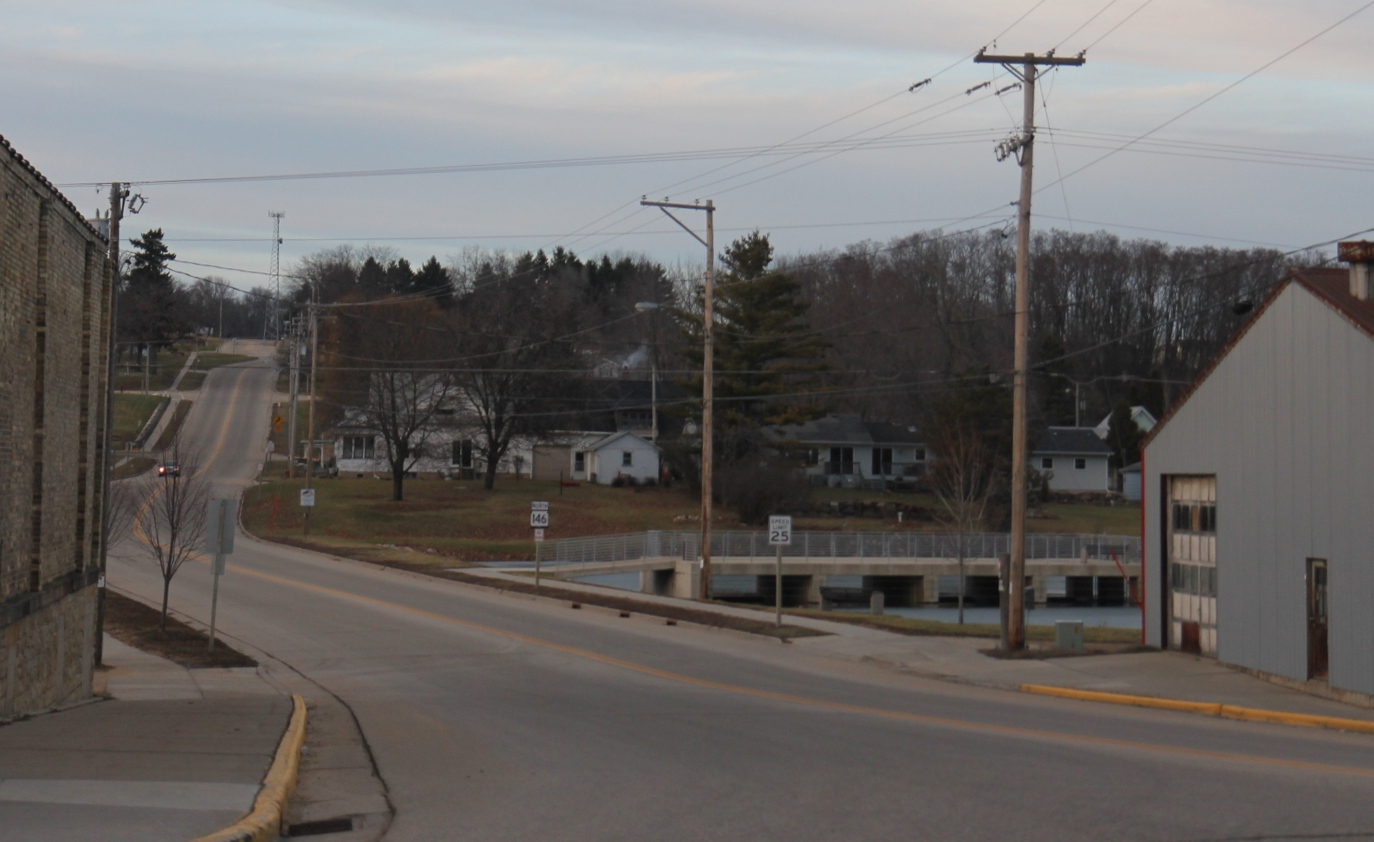
Cambria

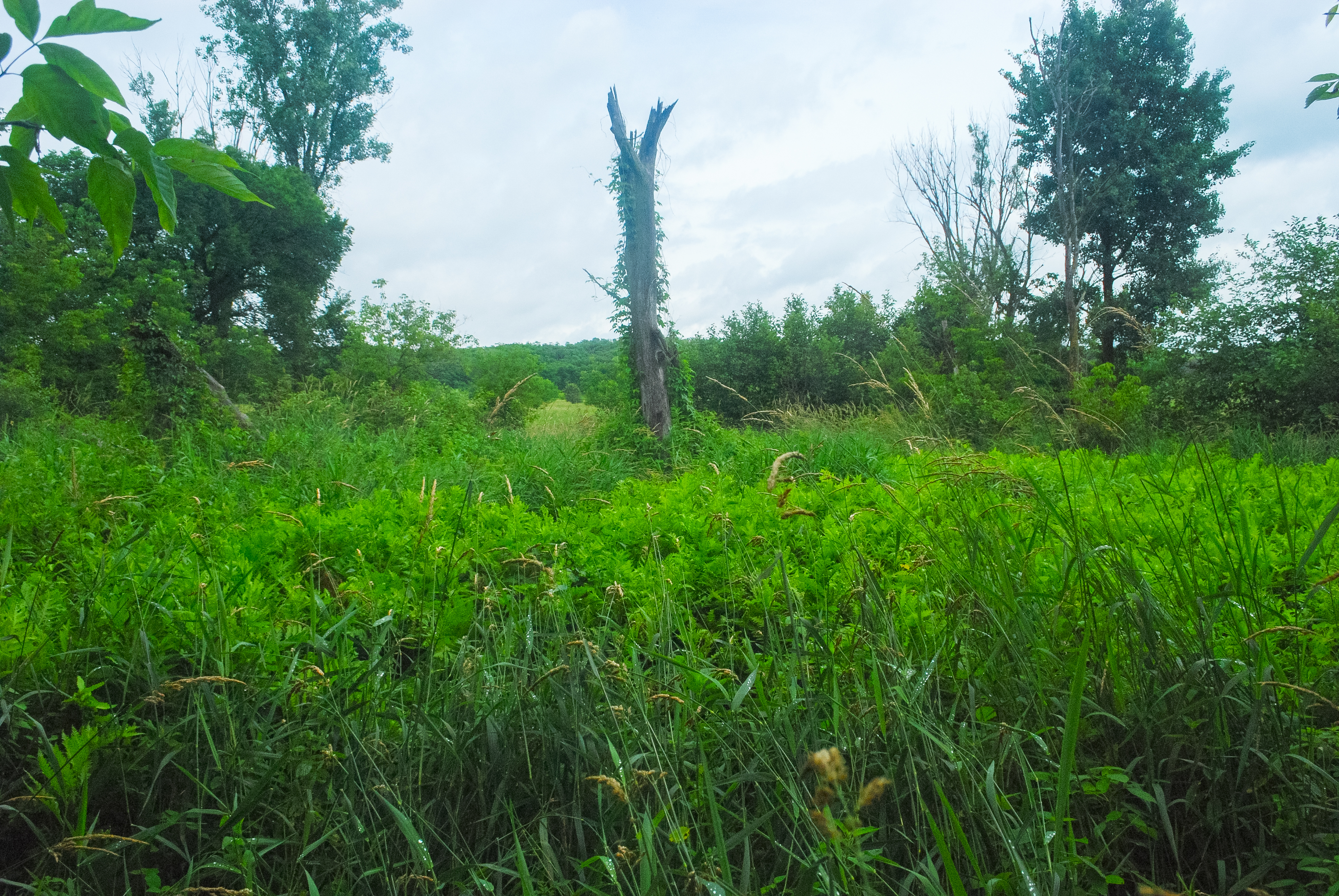
Summerton Bog

== Past senators ==
The district has previously been represented by:

Note: the boundaries of districts have changed repeatedly over history. Previous politicians of a specific numbered district have represented a completely different geographic area, due to redistricting.

Senator	Party	Notes	Session	Years	District Definition
District created				1848	Waukesha County
Joseph Turner	Dem.		1st	1848	Waukesha County
Frederick Sprague	Dem.		2nd	1849	Waukesha County
Frederick Sprague	Dem.		3rd	1850	Waukesha County
George Hyer	Dem.	Resigned.	4th	1851	Waukesha County
--Vacant--			5th	1852	Waukesha County
E. B. West	Whig	Won 1852 special election.	5th	1852	Waukesha County
Charles Dunn	Dem.		6th	1853	1852–1855 1856–1860 1861–1865 1866–1870; Lafayette County
Charles Dunn	Dem.		7th	1854	1852–1855 1856–1860 1861–1865 1866–1870; Lafayette County
Charles Dunn	Dem.		8th	1855	1852–1855 1856–1860 1861–1865 1866–1870; Lafayette County
Charles Dunn	Dem.		9th	1856	1852–1855 1856–1860 1861–1865 1866–1870; Lafayette County
Philemon Simpson	Dem.		10th	1857	1852–1855 1856–1860 1861–1865 1866–1870; Lafayette County
Philemon Simpson	Dem.		11th	1858	1852–1855 1856–1860 1861–1865 1866–1870; Lafayette County
Philemon Simpson	Dem.		12th	1859	1852–1855 1856–1860 1861–1865 1866–1870; Lafayette County
Philemon Simpson	Dem.		13th	1860	1852–1855 1856–1860 1861–1865 1866–1870; Lafayette County
Samuel Cole	Dem.		14th	1861	1852–1855 1856–1860 1861–1865 1866–1870; Lafayette County
Samuel Cole	Dem.		15th	1862	1852–1855 1856–1860 1861–1865 1866–1870; Lafayette County
James Earnest	Dem.		16th	1863	1852–1855 1856–1860 1861–1865 1866–1870; Lafayette County
James Earnest	Dem.		17th	1864	1852–1855 1856–1860 1861–1865 1866–1870; Lafayette County
Samuel Cole	Natl. Union		18th	1865	1852–1855 1856–1860 1861–1865 1866–1870; Lafayette County
Samuel Cole	Natl. Union		19th	1866	1852–1855 1856–1860 1861–1865 1866–1870; Lafayette County
James Earnest	Dem.		20th	1867	1852–1855 1856–1860 1861–1865 1866–1870; Lafayette County
James Earnest	Dem.		21st	1868	1852–1855 1856–1860 1861–1865 1866–1870; Lafayette County
Hamilton H. Gray	Dem.		22nd	1869	1852–1855 1856–1860 1861–1865 1866–1870; Lafayette County
Hamilton H. Gray	Dem.		23rd	1870	1852–1855 1856–1860 1861–1865 1866–1870; Lafayette County
Henry S. Magoon	Rep.	Redistricted to 11th district.	24th	1871	1852–1855 1856–1860 1861–1865 1866–1870; Lafayette County
Satterlee Clark Jr.	Dem.	Redistricted from 33rd district.	25th	1872	Most of Dodge County
Samuel D. Burchard	Dem.		26th	1873	Most of Dodge County
Samuel D. Burchard	Dem.		27th	1874	Most of Dodge County
John A. Barney	Dem.		28th	1875	Most of Dodge County
John A. Barney	Dem.		29th	1876	Most of Dodge County
Charles H. Williams	Dem.		30th	1877	Most of Dodge County: Town of Ashippun; Town of Beaver Dam; Town of Burnett; Town of Calamus; Town of Chester; Town of Clyman; Town of Elba; Town of Emmett; Town of Fox Lake; Town of Herman; Town of Hubbard; Town of Hustisford; Town of Lebanon; Town of LeRoy; Town of Lomira; Town of Lowell; Town of Oak Grove; Town of Portland; Town of Rubicon; Town of Shields; Town of Theresa; Town of Trenton; Town of Westford; Town of Williamston; City of Beaver Dam; East ward, village of Randolph; South ward, village of Waupun
Charles H. Williams	Dem.		31st	1878	
Edward C. McFetridge	Rep.		32nd	1879	
Edward C. McFetridge	Rep.		33rd	1880	
Arthur K. Delaney	Dem.		34th	1881	
Arthur K. Delaney	Dem.		35th	1882	
Benjamin F. Sherman	Dem.		36th	1883–1884	1882–1887 1888–1891; Dodge County
Benjamin F. Sherman	Dem.		37th	1885–1886	1882–1887 1888–1891; Dodge County
Charles Pettibone	Ind.		38th	1887–1888	1882–1887 1888–1891; Dodge County
Charles Pettibone	Ind.		39th	1889–1890	1882–1887 1888–1891; Dodge County
William Voss	Dem.		40th	1891–1892	1882–1887 1888–1891; Dodge County
William Voss	Dem.		41st	1893–1894	Most of Dodge County & eastern Columbia County: Columbia County; Town of Columbus; Town of Courtland; Town of Fountain Prairie; Town of Hampden; Town of Leeds; Town of Lowville; Town of Marcellon; Town of Otsego; Town of Randolph; Town of Scott; Town of Springvale; Town of Wyocena; Village of Rio; City of Columbus; West ward, village of Randolph; Dodge County; Town of Ashippun; Town of Beaver Dam; Town of Calamus; Town of Clyman; Town of Elba; Town of Emmett; Town of Fox Lake; Town of Herman; Town of Hustisford; Town of Lebanon; Town of Lowell; Town of Oak Grove; Town of Portland; Town of Rubicon; Town of Shields; Town of Westford; Village of Reeseville; City of Beaver Dam; City of Juneau; East ward, village of Randolph; Wards 5, 6, city of Watertown
Michael E. Burke	Dem.		42nd	1895–1896	
Michael E. Burke	Dem.		43rd	1897–1898	1896–1901 1902–1911; Dodge County
Michael A. Jacobs	Dem.		44th	1899–1900	1896–1901 1902–1911; Dodge County
Michael A. Jacobs	Dem.		45th	1901–1902	1896–1901 1902–1911; Dodge County
William C. North	Dem.		46th	1903–1904	1896–1901 1902–1911; Dodge County
William C. North	Dem.		47th	1905–1906	1896–1901 1902–1911; Dodge County
Paul O. Husting	Dem.		48th	1907–1908	1896–1901 1902–1911; Dodge County
Paul O. Husting	Dem.		49th	1909–1910	1896–1901 1902–1911; Dodge County
Paul O. Husting	Dem.		50th	1911–1912	1896–1901 1902–1911; Dodge County
Paul O. Husting	Dem.		51st	1913–1914	1912–1921 1932–1953 1954–1963; Dodge, Washington counties
Byron Barwig	Dem.		52nd	1915–1916	1912–1921 1932–1953 1954–1963; Dodge, Washington counties
Byron Barwig	Dem.		53rd	1917–1918	1912–1921 1932–1953 1954–1963; Dodge, Washington counties
Herman J. F. Bilgrien	Rep.		54th	1919–1920	1912–1921 1932–1953 1954–1963; Dodge, Washington counties
Herman J. F. Bilgrien	Rep.		55th	1921–1922	1912–1921 1932–1953 1954–1963; Dodge, Washington counties
Herman J. F. Bilgrien	Rep.		56th	1923–1924	1912–1921 1932–1953 1954–1963; Dodge, Washington counties
Herman J. F. Bilgrien	Rep.		57th	1925–1926	1912–1921 1932–1953 1954–1963; Dodge, Washington counties
William H. Markham	Rep.		58th	1927–1928	1912–1921 1932–1953 1954–1963; Dodge, Washington counties
William H. Markham	Rep.		59th	1929–1930	1912–1921 1932–1953 1954–1963; Dodge, Washington counties
Eugene A. Clifford	Dem.		60th	1931–1932	1912–1921 1932–1953 1954–1963; Dodge, Washington counties
Eugene A. Clifford	Dem.		61st	1933–1934	1912–1921 1932–1953 1954–1963; Dodge, Washington counties
Frank E. Panzer	Prog.		62nd	1935–1936	1912–1921 1932–1953 1954–1963; Dodge, Washington counties
Frank E. Panzer	Prog.		63rd	1937–1938	1912–1921 1932–1953 1954–1963; Dodge, Washington counties
Jesse Peters	Rep.		64th	1939–1940	1912–1921 1932–1953 1954–1963; Dodge, Washington counties
Jesse Peters	Rep.		65th	1941–1942	1912–1921 1932–1953 1954–1963; Dodge, Washington counties
Frank E. Panzer	Rep.	Died Aug. 1969.	66th	1943–1944	1912–1921 1932–1953 1954–1963; Dodge, Washington counties
Frank E. Panzer	Rep.	Died Aug. 1969.	67th	1945–1946	1912–1921 1932–1953 1954–1963; Dodge, Washington counties
Frank E. Panzer	Rep.	Died Aug. 1969.	68th	1947–1948	1912–1921 1932–1953 1954–1963; Dodge, Washington counties
Frank E. Panzer	Rep.	Died Aug. 1969.	69th	1949–1950	1912–1921 1932–1953 1954–1963; Dodge, Washington counties
Frank E. Panzer	Rep.	Died Aug. 1969.	70th	1951–1952	1912–1921 1932–1953 1954–1963; Dodge, Washington counties
Frank E. Panzer	Rep.	Died Aug. 1969.	71st	1953–1954	1912–1921 1932–1953 1954–1963; Dodge, Washington counties
Frank E. Panzer	Rep.	Died Aug. 1969.	72nd	1955–1956	1912–1921 1932–1953 1954–1963; Dodge, Washington counties
Frank E. Panzer	Rep.	Died Aug. 1969.	73rd	1957–1958	1912–1921 1932–1953 1954–1963; Dodge, Washington counties
Frank E. Panzer	Rep.	Died Aug. 1969.	74th	1959–1960	1912–1921 1932–1953 1954–1963; Dodge, Washington counties
Frank E. Panzer	Rep.	Died Aug. 1969.	75th	1961–1962	1912–1921 1932–1953 1954–1963; Dodge, Washington counties
Frank E. Panzer	Rep.	Died Aug. 1969.	76th	1963–1964	1912–1921 1932–1953 1954–1963; Dodge, Washington counties
Frank E. Panzer	Rep.	Died Aug. 1969.	77th	1965–1966	Jefferson, Washington & eastern Dodge County: Town of Beaver Dam; Town of Burnett; Town of Calamus; Town of Chester; Town of Elba; Town of Fox Lake; Town of Lowell; Town of Portland; Town of Trenton; Town of Westford; Village of Lowell; Village of Reeseville; City of Beaver Dam; City of Fox Lake; East Ward, village of Randolph; Wards 1, 2, 3, 4, city of Waupun
Frank E. Panzer	Rep.	Died Aug. 1969.	78th	1967–1968	Jefferson, Washington & eastern Dodge County: Town of Beaver Dam; Town of Burnett; Town of Calamus; Town of Chester; Town of Elba; Town of Fox Lake; Town of Lowell; Town of Portland; Town of Trenton; Town of Westford; Village of Lowell; Village of Reeseville; City of Beaver Dam; City of Fox Lake; East Ward, village of Randolph; Wards 1, 2, 3, 4, city of Waupun
Frank E. Panzer	Rep.	Died Aug. 1969.	79th	1969–1970	Jefferson, Washington & eastern Dodge County: Town of Beaver Dam; Town of Burnett; Town of Calamus; Town of Chester; Town of Elba; Town of Fox Lake; Town of Lowell; Town of Portland; Town of Trenton; Town of Westford; Village of Lowell; Village of Reeseville; City of Beaver Dam; City of Fox Lake; East Ward, village of Randolph; Wards 1, 2, 3, 4, city of Waupun
--Vacant--			79th	1969–1970	Jefferson, Washington & eastern Dodge County: Town of Beaver Dam; Town of Burnett; Town of Calamus; Town of Chester; Town of Elba; Town of Fox Lake; Town of Lowell; Town of Portland; Town of Trenton; Town of Westford; Village of Lowell; Village of Reeseville; City of Beaver Dam; City of Fox Lake; East Ward, village of Randolph; Wards 1, 2, 3, 4, city of Waupun
Dale McKenna	Dem.	Won 1969 special election.	79th	1969–1970	Jefferson, Washington & eastern Dodge County: Town of Beaver Dam; Town of Burnett; Town of Calamus; Town of Chester; Town of Elba; Town of Fox Lake; Town of Lowell; Town of Portland; Town of Trenton; Town of Westford; Village of Lowell; Village of Reeseville; City of Beaver Dam; City of Fox Lake; East Ward, village of Randolph; Wards 1, 2, 3, 4, city of Waupun
Dale McKenna	Dem.	Won 1969 special election.	80th	1971–1972	Jefferson, Washington & eastern Dodge County: Town of Beaver Dam; Town of Burnett; Town of Calamus; Town of Chester; Town of Elba; Town of Fox Lake; Town of Lowell; Town of Portland; Town of Trenton; Town of Westford; Village of Lowell; Village of Reeseville; City of Beaver Dam; City of Fox Lake; East Ward, village of Randolph; Wards 1, 2, 3, 4, city of Waupun
Dale McKenna	Dem.	Won 1969 special election.	81st	1973–1974	Eastern Dane County & western Jefferson County: Dane County; Town of Albion; Town of Blooming Grove; Town of Burke; Town of Christiana; Town of Cottage Grove; Town of Deerfield; Town of Dunn; Town of Fitchburg; Town of Medina; Town of Pleasant Springs; Village of Cambridge; Village of Cottage Grove; Village of Marshall; Village of McFarland; City of Monona; Part of the city of Madison; Jefferson County; Town of Aztalan; Town of Cold Springs; Town of Farmington; Town of Hebron; Town of Jefferson; Town of Koshkonong; Town of Oakland; Town of Sullivan; Town of Sumner; Town of Watertown; Village of Johnson Creek; Village of Sullivan; City of Fort Atkinson; City of Jefferson; Part of the city of Watertown; Part of the city of Whitewater
Dale McKenna	Dem.	Won 1969 special election.	82nd	1975–1976	
Dale McKenna	Dem.	Won 1969 special election.	83rd	1977–1978	
Peter D. Bear	Dem.	Resigned Sep. 1980.	84th	1979–1980	
--Vacant--			84th	1979–1980	
Barbara Lorman	Rep.	Won 1980 special election.	85th	1981–1982	
Barbara Lorman	Rep.	Won 1980 special election.	86th	1983–1984	Most of Dodge County part of Fond du Lac County most of Jefferson County northeast Rock County & part of Walworth County: Dodge County; Town of Beaver Dam; Town of Burnette; Town of Calamus; Town of Chester; Town of Clyman; Town of Elba; Town of Emmet; Town of Fox Lake; Town of Hustisford; Town of Lebanon; Town of Leroy; Town of Lowell; Town of Oak Grove; Town of Portland; Town of Shields; Town of Trenton; Village of Clyman; Village of Hustisford; Village of Lowell; Village of Reeseville; City of Beaver Dam; City of Fox Lake; City of Juneau; City of Watertown; City of Waupun; Fond du Lac County; City of Waupun; Jefferson County; Town of Aztalan; Town of Cold Spring; Town of Concord; Town of Farmington; Town of Hebron; Town of Ixonia; Town of Jefferson; Town of Koshkonong; Town of Lake Mills; Town of Milford; Town of Oakland; Town of Sumner; Town of Waterloo; Town of Watertown; Village of Johnson Creek; Village of Sullivan; City of Fort Atkinson; City of Jefferson; City of Lake Mills; City of Waterloo; City of Watertown; City of Whitewater; Rock County; Town of Harmony; Town of Johnstown; Town of Lima; Wards 14-19, city of Janesville; Walworth County; City of Whitewater
Barbara Lorman	Rep.	Won 1980 special election.	87th	1985–1986	part of Columbia County most of Dodge County part of Fond du Lac County most of Jefferson County northeast Rock County & northwest Walworth County: Columbia County; Village of Randolph; Dodge County; Town of Beaver Dam; Town of Burnette; Town of Calamus; Town of Chester; Town of Clyman; Town of Emmet; Town of Fox Lake; Town of Hustisford; Town of Lebanon; Town of LeRoy; Town of Lowell; Town of Oak Grove; Town of Shields; Town of Trenton; Village of Clyman; Village of Hustisford; Village of Lowell; Village of Randolph; Village of Reeseville; City of Beaver Dam; City of Fox Lake; City of Juneau; City of Watertown; City of Waupun; Jefferson County; Town of Aztalan; Town of Cold Spring; Town of Farmington; Town of Hebron; Town of Ixonia; Town of Jefferson; Town of Koshkonong; Town of Lake Mills; Town of Milford; Town of Oakland; Town of Waterloo; Town of Watertown; Village of Johnson Creek; City of Fort Atkinson; City of Jefferson; City of Lake Mills; City of Waterloo; City of Watertown; City of Whitewater; Rock County; Town of Harmony; Town of Johnstown; Town of Lima; Wards 2, 15-19, city of Janesville; Walworth County; Town of La Grange; Town of Whitewater; City of Whitewater
Barbara Lorman	Rep.	Won 1980 special election.	88th	1987–1988	
Barbara Lorman	Rep.	Won 1980 special election.	89th	1989–1990	
Barbara Lorman	Rep.	Won 1980 special election.	90th	1991–1992	
Barbara Lorman	Rep.	Won 1980 special election.	91st	1993–1994	Part of Columbia County part of Dane County most of Dodge County most of Jefferson County part of Rock County & northwest Waukesha County: Columbia County; Town of Randolph; Village of Cambria; Village of Friesland; City of Columbus; Dane County; Village of Cambridge; Dodge County; Town of Ashippun; Town of Beaver Dam; Town of Burnette; Town of Calamus; Town of Clyman; Town of Elba; Town of Emmet; Town of Fox Lake; Town of Hustisford; Town of Lebanon; Town of Leroy; Town of Lowell; Town of Oak Grove; Town of Portland; Town of Shields; Town of Theresa; Town of Trenton; Town of Westford; Town of Williamstown; Village of Brownsville; Village of Clyman; Village of Hustisford; Village of Iron Ridge; Village of Kekoskee; Village of Lowell; Village of Randolph; Village of Reeseville; Village of Theresa; City of Beaver Dam; City of Columbus; City of Fox Lake; City of Horicon; City of Juneau; City of Mayville; Ward 1, town of Chester; Ward 2, town of Lomira; Jefferson County; Town of Aztalan; Town of Farmington; Town of Ixonia; Town of Koshkonong; Town of Lake Mills; Town of Milford; Town of Oakland; Town of Sumner; Town of Waterloo; Town of Watertown; Village of Cambridge; Village of Johnson Creek; City of Fort Atkinson; City of Jefferson; City of Lake Mills; City of Waterloo; City of Watertown; Wards 3,4, town of Jefferson; Rock County; Ward 3, town of Milton; Waukesha County; Town of Oconomowoc; Village of Lac La Belle; Village of Oconomowoc Lake; City of Oconomowoc
Scott L. Fitzgerald	Rep.	Resigned 2020 after elected to U.S. House.	92nd	1995–1996	
Scott L. Fitzgerald	Rep.	Resigned 2020 after elected to U.S. House.	93rd	1997–1998	
Scott L. Fitzgerald	Rep.	Resigned 2020 after elected to U.S. House.	94th	1999–2000	
Scott L. Fitzgerald	Rep.	Resigned 2020 after elected to U.S. House.	95th	2001–2002	
Scott L. Fitzgerald	Rep.	Resigned 2020 after elected to U.S. House.	96th	2003–2004	Part of Columbia County southeast Dane County most of Dodge County western Jefferson County & northwest Waukesha County: Columbia County; Town of Randolph; Village of Cambria; Village of Friesland; Village of Randolph; City of Columbus; Dane County; Town of Albion; Town of Christiana; Town of Deerfield; Village of Cambridge; Village of Deerfield; Village of Rochdale; Dodge County; Town of Ashippun; Town of Beaver Dam; Town of Burnett; Town of Calamus; Town of Chester; Town of Clyman; Town of Elba; Town of Emmet; Town of Fox Lake; Town of Herman; Town of Hubbard; Town of Hustisford; Town of Lebanon; Town of Leroy; Town of Lomira; Town of Lowell; Town of Oak Grove; Town of Portland; Town of Rubicon; Town of Shields; Town of Trenton; Town of Westford; Town of Williamstown; Village of Brownsville; Village of Clyman; Village of Hustisford; Village of Iron Ridge; Village of Kekoskee; Village of Lomira; Village of Lowell; Village of Neosho; Village of Randolph; Village of Reeseville; City of Beaver Dam; City of Columbus; City of Fox Lake; City of Horicon; City of Juneau; City of Maxville; City of Watertown; Jefferson County; Town of Aztalan; Town of Ixonia; Town of Jefferson; Town of Koshkonong; Town of Lake Mills; Town of Milford; Town of Oakland; Town of Sumner; Town of Waterloo; Town of Watertown; Village of Cambridge; City of Fort Atkinson; City of Jefferson; City of Lake Mills; City of Waterloo; City of Watertown; Waukesha County; Town of Oconomowoc; Village of Lac La Belle; Wards 1-6, city of Oconomowoc
Scott L. Fitzgerald	Rep.	Resigned 2020 after elected to U.S. House.	97th	2005–2006	
Scott L. Fitzgerald	Rep.	Resigned 2020 after elected to U.S. House.	98th	2007–2008	
Scott L. Fitzgerald	Rep.	Resigned 2020 after elected to U.S. House.	99th	2009–2010	
Scott L. Fitzgerald	Rep.	Resigned 2020 after elected to U.S. House.	100th	2011–2012	
Scott L. Fitzgerald	Rep.	Resigned 2020 after elected to U.S. House.	101st	2013–2014	Eastern Columbia County most of Dodge County northern Jefferson County western Washington County eastern Dane County & northwest Waukesha: Columbia County; City of Columbus; Dodge County; Town of Ashippun; Town of Beaver Dam; Town of Clyman; Town of Emmet; Town of Elba; Town of Herman; Town of Hubbard; Town of Hustisford; Town of Lebanon; Town of LeRoy; Town of Lomira; Town of Lowell; Town of Oak Grove; Town of Portland; Town of Rubicon; Town of Shields; Town of Theresa; Town of Williamstown; Village of Brownsville; Village of Clyman; Village of Hustisford; Village of Iron Ridge; Village of Kekoskee; Village of Lomira; Village of Lowell; Village of Neosho; Village of Reeseville; Village of Theresa; City of Beaver Dam; City of Horicon; City of Juneau; City of Mayville; Jefferson County; Town of Aztalan; Town of Concord; Town of Farmington; Town of Ixonia; Town of Lake Mills; Town of Milford; Town of Waterloo; Town of Watertown; Village of Johnson Creek; City of Lake Mills; City of Waterloo; City of Watertown; Washington County; Part of the City of Hartford; Dane County; Town of Bristol; Town of Christiana; Town of Deerfield; Town of York; Village of Cambridge; Village of Deerfield; Village of Marshall; Part of the Town of Windsor; Part of the Village of DeForest; Waukesha County; Town of Oconomowoc; Village of Lac La Belle; City of Oconomowoc; Part of the Town of Summit
Scott L. Fitzgerald	Rep.	Resigned 2020 after elected to U.S. House.	102nd	2015–2016	
Scott L. Fitzgerald	Rep.	Resigned 2020 after elected to U.S. House.	103rd	2017–2018	
Scott L. Fitzgerald	Rep.	Resigned 2020 after elected to U.S. House.	104th	2019–2020	
--Vacant--			105th	2021–2022	
John Jagler	Rep.	Won 2021 special election. Re-elected 2022.	105th	2021–2022	
John Jagler	Rep.	Won 2021 special election. Re-elected 2022.	106th	2023–2024	Southeast Columbia County, most of Dodge County, northeast Dane County, northern Jefferson County, part of Waukesha County
John Jagler	Rep.	Won 2021 special election. Re-elected 2022.	107th	2025–2026	
