= Wisconsin's 5th congressional district =

U.S. House district for Wisconsin

Coordinates: 43°11′59″N 88°31′53″W

- Interactive map of district boundaries since January 3, 2023
- Representative: Scott Fitzgerald; R–Clyman
- Area: 2,219.22 mi^{2} (5,747.8 km^{2})
- Distribution: 74.76% urban; 25.24% rural
- Population (2025): 751,427
- Median household income: $100,119
- Ethnicity: 85.40% White; 6.94% Two or more races; 6.46% Hispanic; 3.28% Asian; 2.35% Black; 1.73% other; 0.26% Native American; 0.05% Pacific Islander Americans
- Cook PVI: R+11
- Created: 1863

Wisconsin's 5th congressional district is a congressional district of the United States House of Representatives in Wisconsin, covering most of Milwaukee's northern and western suburbs. It presently covers all of Washington and Jefferson counties, most of Waukesha County, and portions of Dodge, Milwaukee and Walworth counties. It is currently represented by Republican Scott Fitzgerald.

With a Cook Partisan Voting Index rating of R+11, it is one of the most Republican districts in Wisconsin. George W. Bush carried the district in 2004 with 63% of the vote. The 5th District was the only district in Wisconsin that John McCain won in 2008, giving 57.73% of the vote to McCain and 41.28% to Barack Obama. In 2024, Donald Trump carried the district with 60.24% of the vote, the second most only behind the 7th district.

For most of the 20th century, the 5th District was a Milwaukee-based district. It had vastly different boundaries from the current 5th, as well as a dramatically different political history, represented often by Democrats or even Socialists. From 1983 to 2003, it covered the northern half of Milwaukee, including downtown, as well as some suburbs to the north. Meanwhile, most of the territory now in the 5th was part of the 9th district from 1965 to 2003. After Wisconsin lost a district in the 2000 census, all of Milwaukee was merged into the 4th district, while the old 9th essentially became the new 5th.

It is the wealthiest congressional district in the state of Wisconsin.

== Recent election results from statewide races ==
Year	Office	Results
2008	President	McCain 60% - 39%
2010	Senate	Johnson 69% - 30%
2010	Governor	Walker 70% - 29%
2010	Secretary of State	King 65% - 35%
2010	Attorney General	Van Hollen 74% - 26%
2010	Treasurer	Schuller 70% - 30%
2012	President	Romney 65% - 35%
2012	Senate	Thompson 64% - 34%
2012	Governor (Recall)	Walker 70% - 29%
2014	Governor	Walker 71% - 29%
2014	Secretary of State	Bradley 65% - 32%
2014	Attorney General	Schimel 70% - 28%
2014	Treasurer	Adamczyk 68% - 28%
2016	President	Trump 60% - 33%
2016	Senate	Johnson 66% - 31%
2018	Senate	Vukmir 61% - 39%
2018	Governor	Walker 65% - 33%
2018	Secretary of State	Schroeder 63% - 37%
2018	Attorney General	Schimel 65% - 33%
2018	Treasurer	Hartwig 63% - 35%
2020	President	Trump 61% - 38%
2022	Senate	Johnson 63% - 37%
2022	Governor	Michels 61% - 39%
2022	Secretary of State	Loudenbeck 61% - 36%
2022	Attorney General	Toney 62% - 38%
2022	Treasurer	Leiber 63% - 35%
2024	President	Trump 60% - 38%
2024	Senate	Hovde 60% - 38%

== Counties and municipalities within the district ==
For the 118th and successive Congresses (based on redistricting following the 2020 census), the district contains all or portions of the following counties, towns, and municipalities:

Dodge County (26)

Ashippun, Beaver Dam, Calamus, Clyman (town), Clyman (village), Elba, Emmet, Hartford (shared with Washington County), Herman, Horicon, Hubbard, Hustisford (town), Hustisford (village), Iron Ridge, Juneau, Lebanon, Lowell (town), Lowell (village), Neosho, Oak Grove, Portland, Reeseville, Rubicon, Shields, Theresa (part; also 6th), Watertown (shared with Jefferson County)

Jefferson County (27)

All 27 towns and municipalities

Milwaukee County (2)

Greenfield (part; also 4th), West Allis (part; also 4th)

Walworth County (3)

East Troy (town), East Troy (village) (part; also 1st), Mukwonago (shared with Waukesha County)

Washington County (21)

All 21 towns and municipalities

Waukesha County (39)

All 39 towns and municipalities

== List of members representing the district ==
Member	Party	Years	Cong ress	Electoral history	District
District established March 4, 1863
Ezra Wheeler (Berlin)	Democratic	March 4, 1863 – March 3, 1865	38th	Elected in 1862. Retired.	Brown, Calumet, Door, Green Lake, Kewaunee, Manitowoc, Marquette, Oconto, Outagamie, Shawano, Waupaca, Waushara, & Winnebago counties
Philetus Sawyer (Oshkosh)	Republican	March 4, 1865 – March 3, 1873	39th 40th 41st 42nd	Elected in 1864. Re-elected in 1866. Re-elected in 1868. Re-elected in 1870. Redistricted to the 6th district.	Brown, Calumet, Door, Green Lake, Kewaunee, Manitowoc, Marquette, Oconto, Outagamie, Shawano, Waupaca, Waushara, & Winnebago counties
Charles A. Eldredge (Fond du Lac)	Democratic	March 4, 1873 – March 3, 1875	43rd	Redistricted from the 4th district and re-elected in 1872. Lost renomination.	Dodge, Fond du Lac, Manitowoc, & Sheboygan counties
Samuel D. Burchard (Beaver Dam)	Democratic	March 4, 1875 – March 3, 1877	44th	Elected in 1874. Lost renomination.	Dodge, Fond du Lac, Manitowoc, & Sheboygan counties
Edward S. Bragg (Fond du Lac)	Democratic	March 4, 1877 – March 3, 1883	45th 46th 47th	Elected in 1876. Re-elected in 1878. Re-elected in 1880. Redistricted to the 2nd district and lost renomination.	Dodge, Fond du Lac, Manitowoc, & Sheboygan counties
Joseph Rankin (Manitowoc)	Democratic	March 4, 1883 – January 24, 1886	48th 49th	Elected in 1882. Re-elected in 1884. Died.	Brown, Calumet, Kewaunee, Manitowoc, Ozaukee, & Sheboygan counties
Vacant		January 24, 1886 – March 8, 1886	49th		Brown, Calumet, Kewaunee, Manitowoc, Ozaukee, & Sheboygan counties
Thomas R. Hudd (Green Bay)	Democratic	March 8, 1886 – March 3, 1889	49th 50th	Elected to finish Rankin's term. Re-elected in 1886. Retired.	Brown, Calumet, Kewaunee, Manitowoc, Ozaukee, & Sheboygan counties
George H. Brickner (Sheboygan Falls)	Democratic	March 4, 1889 – March 3, 1895	51st 52nd 53rd	Elected in 1888. Re-elected in 1890. Re-elected in 1892. Retired.	Brown, Calumet, Kewaunee, Manitowoc, Ozaukee, & Sheboygan counties
George H. Brickner (Sheboygan Falls)	Democratic	March 4, 1889 – March 3, 1895	51st 52nd 53rd	Elected in 1888. Re-elected in 1890. Re-elected in 1892. Retired.	Ozaukee, Sheboygan, Washington, & Waukesha counties & northern Milwaukee County: Town of Granville; Town of Milwaukee; Town of Wauwatosa; Wards 10, 13, city of Milwaukee
Samuel S. Barney (West Bend)	Republican	March 4, 1895 – March 3, 1903	54th 55th 56th 57th	Elected in 1894. Re-elected in 1896. Re-elected in 1898. Re-elected in 1900. Retired.	Ozaukee, Sheboygan, Washington, & Waukesha counties & northern Milwaukee County: Town of Granville; Town of Milwaukee; Town of Wauwatosa; Wards 10, 13, city of Milwaukee
William H. Stafford (Milwaukee)	Republican	March 4, 1903 – March 3, 1911	58th 59th 60th 61st	Elected in 1902. Re-elected in 1904. Re-elected in 1906. Re-elected in 1908. Lost renomination.	Waukesha County & northern Milwaukee County: Village of East Milwaukee; Village of North Milwaukee; Village of Whitefish Bay; Town of Granville; Town of Milwaukee; Wards 1, 6, 9, 10, 13, 18-22, city of Milwaukee
Victor L. Berger (Milwaukee)	Socialist	March 4, 1911 – March 3, 1913	62nd	Elected in 1910. Lost re-election.	Waukesha County & northern Milwaukee County: Village of East Milwaukee; Village of North Milwaukee; Village of Whitefish Bay; Town of Granville; Town of Milwaukee; Wards 1, 6, 9, 10, 13, 18-22, city of Milwaukee
William H. Stafford (Milwaukee)	Republican	March 4, 1913 – March 3, 1919	63rd 64th 65th	Elected in 1912. Re-elected in 1914. Re-elected in 1916. Lost re-election.	Northern Milwaukee County: Village of East Milwaukee; Village of North Milwaukee; Village of Whitefish Bay; Town of Granville; Town of Milwaukee; Wards 1, 2, 6, 7, 9, 10, 13, 15, 18-22, 25, city of Milwaukee
Victor L. Berger (Milwaukee)	Socialist	March 4, 1919 – November 10, 1919	66th	Elected in 1918. Disqualified and unseated. Re-elected to finish his own term. Denied seat by Congress.	Northern Milwaukee County: Village of East Milwaukee; Village of North Milwaukee; Village of Whitefish Bay; Town of Granville; Town of Milwaukee; Wards 1, 2, 6, 7, 9, 10, 13, 15, 18-22, 25, city of Milwaukee
Vacant		November 10, 1919 – March 3, 1921	66th	Congress refused to seat Representative-elect Victor L. Berger.	Northern Milwaukee County: Village of East Milwaukee; Village of North Milwaukee; Village of Whitefish Bay; Town of Granville; Town of Milwaukee; Wards 1, 2, 6, 7, 9, 10, 13, 15, 18-22, 25, city of Milwaukee
William H. Stafford (Milwaukee)	Republican	March 4, 1921 – March 3, 1923	67th	Elected in 1920. Lost re-election.	Northern Milwaukee County: Village of East Milwaukee; Village of North Milwaukee; Village of Whitefish Bay; Town of Granville; Town of Milwaukee; Wards 1, 2, 6, 7, 9, 10, 13, 15, 18-22, 25, city of Milwaukee
Victor L. Berger (Milwaukee)	Socialist	March 4, 1923 – March 3, 1929	68th 69th 70th	Elected in 1922. Re-elected in 1924. Re-elected in 1926. Lost re-election.	Northern Milwaukee County: Village of East Milwaukee; Village of North Milwaukee; Village of Whitefish Bay; Town of Granville; Town of Milwaukee; Wards 1, 2, 6, 7, 9, 10, 13, 15, 18-22, 25, city of Milwaukee
William H. Stafford (Milwaukee)	Republican	March 4, 1929 – March 3, 1933	71st 72nd	Elected in 1928. Re-elected in 1930. Lost renomination.	Northern Milwaukee County: Village of East Milwaukee; Village of North Milwaukee; Village of Whitefish Bay; Town of Granville; Town of Milwaukee; Wards 1, 2, 6, 7, 9, 10, 13, 15, 18-22, 25, city of Milwaukee
Thomas O'Malley (Milwaukee)	Democratic	March 4, 1933 – January 3, 1939	73rd 74th 75th	Elected in 1932. Re-elected in 1934. Re-elected in 1936. Lost re-election.	Northern Milwaukee County: Village of Fox Point; Village of River Hills; Village of Shorewood; Village of Whitefish Bay; Town of Granville; Town of Milwaukee; Wards 1, 2, 6, 7, 9, 10, 13, 15, 18-22, 25, 26, city of Milwaukee
Lewis D. Thill (Milwaukee)	Republican	January 3, 1939 – January 3, 1943	76th 77th	Elected in 1938. Re-elected in 1940. Lost re-election.	Northern Milwaukee County: Village of Fox Point; Village of River Hills; Village of Shorewood; Village of Whitefish Bay; Town of Granville; Town of Milwaukee; Wards 1, 2, 6, 7, 9, 10, 13, 15, 18-22, 25, 26, city of Milwaukee
Howard J. McMurray (Milwaukee)	Democratic	January 3, 1943 – January 3, 1945	78th	Elected in 1942. Retired to run for U.S. Senator.	Northern Milwaukee County: Village of Fox Point; Village of River Hills; Village of Shorewood; Village of Whitefish Bay; Town of Granville; Town of Milwaukee; Wards 1, 2, 6, 7, 9, 10, 13, 15, 18-22, 25, 26, city of Milwaukee
Andrew Biemiller (Milwaukee)	Democratic	January 3, 1945 – January 3, 1947	79th	Elected in 1944. Lost re-election.	Northern Milwaukee County: Village of Fox Point; Village of River Hills; Village of Shorewood; Village of Whitefish Bay; Town of Granville; Town of Milwaukee; Wards 1, 2, 6, 7, 9, 10, 13, 15, 18-22, 25, 26, city of Milwaukee
Charles J. Kersten (Milwaukee)	Republican	January 3, 1947 – January 3, 1949	80th	Elected in 1946. Lost re-election.	Northern Milwaukee County: Village of Fox Point; Village of River Hills; Village of Shorewood; Village of Whitefish Bay; Town of Granville; Town of Milwaukee; Wards 1, 2, 6, 7, 9, 10, 13, 15, 18-22, 25, 26, city of Milwaukee
Andrew Biemiller (Milwaukee)	Democratic	January 3, 1949 – January 3, 1951	81st	Elected in 1948. Lost re-election.	Northern Milwaukee County: Village of Fox Point; Village of River Hills; Village of Shorewood; Village of Whitefish Bay; Town of Granville; Town of Milwaukee; Wards 1, 2, 6, 7, 9, 10, 13, 15, 18-22, 25, 26, city of Milwaukee
Charles J. Kersten (Milwaukee)	Republican	January 3, 1951 – January 3, 1955	82nd 83rd	Elected in 1950. Re-elected in 1952. Lost re-election.	Northern Milwaukee County: Village of Fox Point; Village of River Hills; Village of Shorewood; Village of Whitefish Bay; Town of Granville; Town of Milwaukee; Wards 1, 2, 6, 7, 9, 10, 13, 15, 18-22, 25, 26, city of Milwaukee
Henry S. Reuss (Milwaukee)	Democratic	January 3, 1955 – January 3, 1983	84th 85th 86th 87th 88th 89th 90th 91st 92nd 93rd 94th 95th 96th 97th	Elected in 1954. Re-elected in 1956. Re-elected in 1958. Re-elected in 1960. Re-elected in 1962. Re-elected in 1964. Re-elected in 1966. Re-elected in 1968. Re-elected in 1970. Re-elected in 1972. Re-elected in 1974. Re-elected in 1976. Re-elected in 1978. Re-elected in 1980. Retired.	Northern Milwaukee County: Village of Fox Point; Village of River Hills; Village of Shorewood; Village of Whitefish Bay; Town of Granville; Town of Milwaukee; Wards 1, 2, 6, 7, 9, 10, 13, 15, 18-22, 25, 26, city of Milwaukee
Henry S. Reuss (Milwaukee)	Democratic	January 3, 1955 – January 3, 1983	84th 85th 86th 87th 88th 89th 90th 91st 92nd 93rd 94th 95th 96th 97th	Elected in 1954. Re-elected in 1956. Re-elected in 1958. Re-elected in 1960. Re-elected in 1962. Re-elected in 1964. Re-elected in 1966. Re-elected in 1968. Re-elected in 1970. Re-elected in 1972. Re-elected in 1974. Re-elected in 1976. Re-elected in 1978. Re-elected in 1980. Retired.	Central Milwaukee County: The part of the city of Milwaukee contained by a line extending from the point where N. 60th St. intersects with W. Wright St. at the city limits, following N. 60th St. north to Burleigh St., west to Lisbon Ave., northwest to Wauwatosa Ave., north to Hampton Ave., east to the city limits, then following the city limits to Lake Michigan, following the shore of Lake Michigan south to the mouth of the Milwaukee River, following the river west to the intersection with the Menomonee River, then following the Menomonee River west to the point where it intersects with S. 39th St., then south to the city limits
Henry S. Reuss (Milwaukee)	Democratic	January 3, 1955 – January 3, 1983	84th 85th 86th 87th 88th 89th 90th 91st 92nd 93rd 94th 95th 96th 97th	Elected in 1954. Re-elected in 1956. Re-elected in 1958. Re-elected in 1960. Re-elected in 1962. Re-elected in 1964. Re-elected in 1966. Re-elected in 1968. Re-elected in 1970. Re-elected in 1972. Re-elected in 1974. Re-elected in 1976. Re-elected in 1978. Re-elected in 1980. Retired.	Northern Milwaukee County: The part of the city of Milwaukee north of the line extending from the point where E. St. Paul Ave. meets Lake Michigan, following E. St. Paul Ave. west as it becomes W. St. Paul Ave., continuing west to N. 32nd St., south to I-94, west to S. 39th St., them south to the city limits
Jim Moody (Milwaukee)	Democratic	January 3, 1983 – January 3, 1993	98th 99th 100th 101st 102nd	Elected in 1982. Re-elected in 1984. Re-elected in 1986. Re-elected in 1988. Re-elected in 1990. Retired to run for U.S. Senator.	Northern Milwaukee County: Village of Brown Deer; Village of Shorewood; City of Glendale; City of Wauwatosa; The part of the city of Milwaukee north of the line extending from the point where I-94 intersects with the western city limits, following I-94 east to the point where it intersects the Menomonee River, then following the river east to the point where it merges with the Milwaukee River, then following the Milwaukee River north to E. Juneau Ave., then east to N. Van Buren St., south to E. State St., east to N. Cass St., south to E. Kilbourn Ave., and east to Lake Michigan
Tom Barrett (Milwaukee)	Democratic	January 3, 1993 – January 3, 2003	103rd 104th 105th 106th 107th	Elected in 1992. Re-elected in 1994. Re-elected in 1996. Re-elected in 1998. Re-elected in 2000. Retired to run for Governor of Wisconsin.	Northern Milwaukee County: Village of Brown Deer; Village of Fox Point; Village of River Hills; Village of Shorewood; Village of Whitefish Bay; the part of the village of Bayside in the county; City of Glendale; City of Wauwatosa; The part of the city of Milwaukee north of the line extending from the point where I-94 intersects with the western city limits, following I-94 east to the point where it intersects the Menomonee River, then following the river east to the point where it merges with the Milwaukee River, then following the Milwaukee River north to E. Juneau Ave., then east to N. Edison St., south to E. Highland Ave., east to N. Water St., south to E. Kilbourn St., east to N. Broadway, south to E. Wisconsin Ave., east to N. Jefferson St., north to E. Mason St., east to N. Jackson St., north to E. State St., west to N. Broadway, north to E. Knapp St., east to N. Jefferson St., north to E. Knapp St., east to N. Jefferson St., north to E. Ogden Ave., east to N. Van Buren St., south to E. Juneau Ave., east to N. Marshall, south to E. Mason St., and east to Lake Michigan
Jim Sensenbrenner (Menomonee Falls)	Republican	January 3, 2003 – January 3, 2021	108th 109th 110th 111th 112th 113th 114th 115th 116th	Redistricted from the 9th district and re-elected in 2002. Re-elected in 2004. Re-elected in 2006. Re-elected in 2008. Re-elected in 2010. Re-elected in 2012. Re-elected in 2014. Re-elected in 2016. Re-elected in 2018. Retired.	2003–2013
Jim Sensenbrenner (Menomonee Falls)	Republican	January 3, 2003 – January 3, 2021	108th 109th 110th 111th 112th 113th 114th 115th 116th	Redistricted from the 9th district and re-elected in 2002. Re-elected in 2004. Re-elected in 2006. Re-elected in 2008. Re-elected in 2010. Re-elected in 2012. Re-elected in 2014. Re-elected in 2016. Re-elected in 2018. Retired.	2013–2023
Scott L. Fitzgerald (Clyman)	Republican	January 3, 2021 – present	117th 118th 119th	Elected in 2020. Re-elected in 2022. Re-elected in 2024. Re-elected in 2026.	2013–2023
Scott L. Fitzgerald (Clyman)	Republican	January 3, 2021 – present	117th 118th 119th	Elected in 2020. Re-elected in 2022. Re-elected in 2024. Re-elected in 2026.	2023–present

== Recent election results ==
=== 2002 district boundaries (2002–2011) ===
Year	Date	Elected				Defeated				Total	Plurality
2002	Nov. 5	Jim Sensenbrenner	Republican	191,224	86.13%	Robert R. Raymond	Ind.	29,567	13.32%	222,012	161,657
2004	Nov. 2	Jim Sensenbrenner (inc)	Republican	271,153	66.57%	Bryan Kennedy	Dem.	129,384	31.77%	407,291	141,769
2004	Nov. 2	Jim Sensenbrenner (inc)	Republican	271,153	66.57%	Tim Peterson	Lib.	6,549	1.61%	407,291	141,769
2006	Nov. 7	Jim Sensenbrenner (inc)	Republican	194,669	61.76%	Bryan Kennedy	Dem.	112,451	35.68%	315,180	82,218
2006	Nov. 7	Jim Sensenbrenner (inc)	Republican	194,669	61.76%	Bob Levis	Grn.	4,432	1.41%	315,180	82,218
2006	Nov. 7	Jim Sensenbrenner (inc)	Republican	194,669	61.76%	Robert R. Raymond	Ind.	3,525	1.12%	315,180	82,218
2008	Nov. 4	Jim Sensenbrenner (inc)	Republican	275,271	79.58%	Robert R. Raymond	Ind.	69,715	20.15%	345,899	205,556
2010	Nov. 2	Jim Sensenbrenner (inc)	Republican	229,642	69.32%	Todd P. Kolosso	Dem.	90,634	27.36%	331,258	139,008
2010	Nov. 2	Jim Sensenbrenner (inc)	Republican	229,642	69.32%	Robert R. Raymond	Ind.	10,813	3.26%	331,258	139,008

=== 2011 district boundaries (2012–2021) ===
Year	Date	Elected				Defeated				Total	Plurality
2012	Nov. 6	Jim Sensenbrenner (inc)	Republican	250,335	67.72%	Dave Heaster	Dem.	118,478	32.05%	369,664	131,857
2014	Nov. 4	Jim Sensenbrenner (inc)	Republican	231,160	69.45%	Chris Rockwood	Dem.	101,190	30.40%	332,826	129,970
2016	Nov. 8	Jim Sensenbrenner (inc)	Republican	260,706	69.45%	Khary Penebaker	Dem.	114,477	29.29%	390,844	146,229
2016	Nov. 8	Jim Sensenbrenner (inc)	Republican	260,706	69.45%	John Arndt	Lib.	15,324	3.92%	390,844	146,229
2018	Nov. 6	Jim Sensenbrenner (inc)	Republican	225,619	61.93%	Tom Palzewicz	Dem.	138,385	37.99%	364,288	87,234
2020	Nov. 3	Scott L. Fitzgerald	Republican	265,434	60.11%	Tom Palzewicz	Dem.	175,902	39.83%	441,599	89,532

=== 2022 district boundaries (2022–2031) ===
Year	Date	Elected				Defeated				Total	Plurality
2022	Nov. 8	Scott L. Fitzgerald (inc)	Republican	243,741	64.39%	Mike Van Someren	Dem.	134,581	35.55%	378,523	109,160
2024	Nov. 5	Scott L. Fitzgerald (inc)	Republican	300,521	64.4	Ben Steinhoff	Dem.	165,653	35.5%	466,682	

== See also ==
- Wisconsin's congressional districts
- List of United States congressional districts
