= Jedediah Kimball =

American politician

Member of the Wisconsin State Assembly from the Dodge 4th district
- In office January 1, 1849 – January 7, 1850
- Preceded by: Monroe Thompson
- Succeeded by: William T. Ward

Personal details
- Born: c. 1810 Maine, U.S.
- Party: Democratic
- Occupation: Farmer

Jedediah Kimball (1810 - ?) was a farmer from Portland, Wisconsin (originally from Maine) who served a single one-year term in 1849 (the 2nd Wisconsin Legislature) as a member for the 4th Wisconsin State Assembly district (the Towns of Elba, Lowell, Portland and Clyman) from Dodge County. At the time of taking office (January 10, 1849), he was 38 years old, and had been in Wisconsin four years. He is believed to have been a Democrat; he succeeded Monroe Thompson, a Whig, and was succeeded by Democrat William T. Ward.
