= William T. Ward (Wisconsin legislator) =

American politician

William T. Ward was a hotelier from Hustisford, Wisconsin who spent a single one-year term as a member of the Wisconsin State Assembly for the 1850 session (the 3rd Wisconsin Legislature).

== Background ==
Ward built the first hotel in Hustisford (then part of Wisconsin Territory) in 1846. In that pioneer era many immigrants were passing through the region looking for land and would stop there.

== Legislative service ==
Ward was elected in 1849 for the 1850 session as a Democrat to represent the 4th Dodge County assembly district (the Towns of Elba, Lowell, Portland and Clyman), succeeding fellow Democrat Jedediah Kimball. The next year he was succeeded by Charles B. Whitton, another Democrat.
