= Edward C. McFetridge =

American politician (1836–1914)

9th State Treasurer of Wisconsin
- In office January 2, 1882 – January 3, 1887
- Governor: Jeremiah McLain Rusk
- Preceded by: Richard Guenther
- Succeeded by: Henry B. Harshaw

Member of the Wisconsin Senate from the 13th district
- In office January 6, 1879 – January 3, 1881
- Preceded by: Charles H. Williams
- Succeeded by: Arthur K. Delaney

Member of the Wisconsin State Assembly from the Dodge 4th district
- In office January 3, 1881 – January 2, 1882
- Preceded by: Benjamin F. Sherman
- Succeeded by: Thomas J. Jones
- In office January 7, 1878 – January 6, 1879
- Preceded by: Patrick Roche
- Succeeded by: William Geise

Personal details
- Born: April 15, 1836 Rochester, New York, U.S.
- Died: February 17, 1914 (aged 77) Beaver Dam, Wisconsin, U.S.
- Resting place: Oakwood Cemetery, Beaver Dam, Wisconsin
- Party: Republican
- Spouse: Frances Amelia Blanchard (m. 1861; died 1898)
- Profession: Lawyer

Edward Clinton McFetridge (April 15, 1836 – February 17, 1914) was an American lawyer, businessman, and Republican politician. He was the 9th State Treasurer of Wisconsin (1882–1887) and served 4 years in the Wisconsin Legislature, representing Dodge County.

== Biography ==
Born in Rochester, New York, he was admitted to the New York bar. He moved to Beaver Dam, Wisconsin in 1858, where he practiced law and opened a woolen mill. He served as mayor of Beaver Dam, as county treasurer of Dodge County, Wisconsin, and he also sat on the Dodge County Board of Supervisors. He was a presidential elector in 1872. He served in the Wisconsin State Assembly from 1878 to 1881 and in the Wisconsin State Senate from 1879 until 1880. He also served as the Wisconsin state treasurer from 1882 until 1887. McFetridge died at his home in Beaver Dam, Wisconsin in 1914.

Party political offices
Preceded by Richard Guenther	Republican nominee for State Treasurer of Wisconsin; 1881, 1884	Succeeded by Henry B. Harshaw
Wisconsin State Assembly
Preceded by Patrick Roche	Member of the Wisconsin State Assembly from the Dodge 4th district January 7, 1878 – January 6, 1879	Succeeded by William Geise
Preceded by Benjamin F. Sherman	Member of the Wisconsin State Assembly from the Dodge 4th district January 3, 1881 – January 2, 1882	Succeeded by Thomas J. Jones
Wisconsin Senate
Preceded by Charles H. Williams	Member of the Wisconsin Senate from the 13th district January 6, 1879 – January 3, 1881	Succeeded by Arthur K. Delaney
Political offices
Preceded by Richard Guenther	State Treasurer of Wisconsin; 1882–1887	Succeeded by Henry B. Harshaw
