= Hustisford =

Hustisford may refer to the following places in the United States:

- Hustisford (town), Wisconsin
- Hustisford, Wisconsin, a village inside the town
