= Samuel D. Burchard (politician) =

19th century American congressman

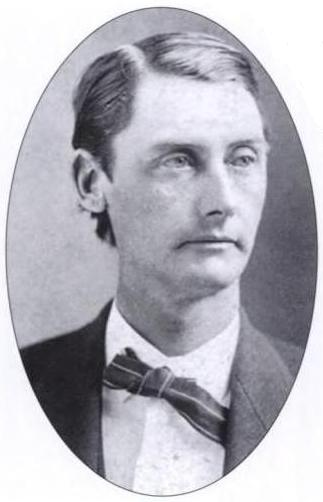
- Burchard, circa 1875. Dodge County (Wisconsin Historical Society).

Member of the U.S. House of Representatives from Wisconsin's 5th district
- In office March 4, 1875 – March 3, 1877
- Preceded by: Charles A. Eldredge
- Succeeded by: Edward S. Bragg

Member of the Wisconsin Senate
- In office January 6, 1873 – January 4, 1875
- Preceded by: Satterlee Clark
- Succeeded by: John A. Barney
- Constituency: 13th district
- In office January 3, 1870 – January 1, 1872
- Preceded by: Henry W. Lander
- Succeeded by: William Hiner
- Constituency: 18th district

Personal details
- Born: July 17, 1836 Leyden, New York, U.S.
- Died: September 1, 1901 (aged 65) Greenwood, Wise County, Texas, U.S.
- Resting place: Greenwood Cemetery, Greenwood, Texas
- Party: Democratic
- Spouses: Mary Jane Simmons (m. 1859; died 1883); Mary E. Page (died 1922)
- Children: Martha Emily (Turner)^{(b. 1864; died 1943)}; Mary Agnes (Dunn)^{(b. 1867; died 1947)}; Samuel F. Burchard^{(b. 1868; died 1944)}; Jennie H. (Mathers)^{(b. 1872; died 1931)}; Esther (Graves)^{(b. 1876; died 1962)}; Susie (Graves)^{(b. 1879; died 1964)}

Military service
- Allegiance: United States
- Branch/service: United States Volunteers; Union Army
- Years of service: 1861-1865
- Rank: Major, USV
- Unit: Missouri State Militia
- Battles/wars: American Civil War

Samuel Dickinson Burchard (July 17, 1836 – September 1, 1901) was an American farmer, businessman, and Democratic politician. He represented Wisconsin's 5th congressional district in the 44th U.S. Congress, and served four years in the Wisconsin State Senate.

== Biography ==
Born in Leyden, New York, Burchard moved to Beaver Dam, Wisconsin with his father Charles Burchard in 1845, attended Madison University and engaged in the manufacturing of wool in Beaver Dam. He relocated to Missouri, where he started managing a plantation in 1856 and raising livestock and then purchased a coal mine before returning to Beaver Dam in 1858. He married Mary Jan Simmons (1839–1883) in 1859. At the outbreak of the Civil War, he entered the Union Army as a lieutenant in the Missouri State Militia, was later appointed assistant quartermaster of volunteers with the rank of captain, being stationed in New York, and was mustered out with the rank of major. Burchard served in the Wisconsin Senate from 1872 to 1874.

Burchard served as mayor of Beaver Dam in 1871, and from 1872 to 1874 he was a member of the Wisconsin Senate. He was elected a Democrat to the United States House of Representatives in 1874 to the 44th United States Congress, serving from March 4, 1875 until March 3, 1877. He served as the representative of Wisconsin's 5th congressional district. Afterwards, he engaged in agricultural pursuits until his death in Greenwood, Texas on September 1, 1901. He was interred in Greenwood Cemetery in Greenwood.

Wisconsin Senate
Preceded by Henry W. Lander	Member of the Wisconsin Senate from the 18th district January 3, 1870 – January 1, 1872	Succeeded by William Hiner
Preceded by Satterlee Clark	Member of the Wisconsin Senate from the 13th district January 6, 1873 – January 4, 1875	Succeeded by John A. Barney
U.S. House of Representatives
Preceded by Charles A. Eldredge	Member of the U.S. House of Representatives from Wisconsin's 5th congressional district March 4, 1875 – March 3, 1877	Succeeded by Edward S. Bragg
