= Jacob Bodden =

German-American politician (1834–1889)

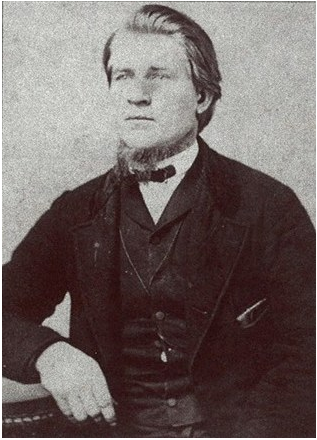

Member of the Wisconsin State Assembly
- In office January 5, 1874 – January 4, 1875
- Preceded by: Dennis Short
- Succeeded by: Max Bachhuber
- Constituency: Dodge 4th district
- In office January 1, 1866 – January 7, 1867
- Preceded by: Peter Peters
- Succeeded by: John Wetherby
- Constituency: Dodge 4th district
- In office January 7, 1861 – January 6, 1862
- Preceded by: Max Bachhuber
- Succeeded by: John F. McCollum
- Constituency: Dodge 2nd district

Chairman of the Dodge County Board of Supervisors
- In office April 1874 – April 1875

Personal details
- Born: Jacob Bodden; September 21, 1831 Lich, Rhine Province, Prussia
- Died: February 21, 1889 (aged 57) Theresa, Wisconsin, U.S.
- Resting place: Saint Theresa Memorial Gardens Cemetery; Theresa, Wisconsin
- Party: Democratic
- Spouses: Agnes (Schafer) Bodden; (died 1858); Gertrude (Shiefer) Bodden; (died 1923)
- Children: 13: with Agnes Schafer; Adam Bodden^{(b. 1858; died 1883)}; with Gertrude Shiefer; Anna Margaretha Bodden^{(b. 1861; died 1947)}; John N. Bodden^{(b. 1862; died 1925)}; Gertrude Bodden^{(b. 1863; died 1923)}; Michael Peter Bodden^{(b. 1865; died 1958)}; Jacob Charles Bodden^{(b. 1866; died 1957)}; William N. Bodden^{(b. 1867; died 1902)}; Ernest A. Bodden^{(b. 1869; died 1960)}; Frank P. Bodden^{(b. 1871; died 1971)}; Mathilda C. Bodden^{(b. 1873; died 1911)}; Hubert V. Bodden^{(b. 1875; died 1955)}; Henry N. Bodden^{(b. 1876; died 1970)}; Amanda M. Bodden^{(b. 1879; died 1937)}; Edmund Micheal Bodden^{(b. 1881; died 1965)}
- Parents: Johann Adam Bodden (father); Anna Margaretha (Grath) Bodden (mother)

Jacob Bodden (September 21, 1831 – February 21, 1889) was a German American immigrant, farmer, and politician. He represented eastern Dodge County for three terms as a member of the Wisconsin State Assembly.

== Biography ==
Bodden was born in Lich, which was, at the time, a part of the Rhine Province of the Kingdom of Prussia (modern day Germany). In 1851, Bodden immigrated to Wisconsin and worked as a farmer. On January 24, 1856, Bodden married Agnes Schafer. On September 3, 1858, Schafer died after giving birth to their only child. In 1860, Bodden married Gertrude Schaefer at the Catholic church in Theresa, Wisconsin. They had 13 children. He died on February 21, 1889, in Theresa.

== Career ==
Bodden served in the Wisconsin State Assembly during the 1861, 1866, and 1874 sessions and was a Democrat. He also served as treasurer and sheriff of Dodge County, Wisconsin. He also was chairman of the county board of supervisors of Dodge County in 1874–75. In 1873, Bodden ran for the state assembly unopposed and received 902 total votes.

== Descendants ==
In 1988, Jacob Bodden's great-grandson, Todd Bodden, ran for Wisconsin's 59th Assembly district as a Democrat and lost in the general election.

In 2022, Jacob Bodden's 3rd great-grandson, Ty Bodden of Stockbridge, Wisconsin, was elected to the Assembly in the 59th Assembly district, running as a Republican. He had previously run unsuccessfully for the Republican nomination in this district in 2018. Like his 3rd great-grandfather, Ty Bodden is a former resident of Theresa, Wisconsin. Ty also used to reside in St. Cloud, Wisconsin, Fond du Lac, Wisconsin and Kewaskum, Wisconsin. He currently resides in Stockbridge, Wisconsin.
