= Charles Williams (Wisconsin state legislator) =

American politician (1844–1922)

Charles H. Williams

Member of the Wisconsin Senate from the 13th district
- In office January 1, 1877 – January 1, 1879
- Preceded by: John A. Barney
- Succeeded by: Edward C. McFetridge

Personal details
- Born: August 13, 1844 Burnett, Wisconsin
- Died: February 2, 1922 (aged 77) Minnesota
- Resting place: Clear Lake Cemetery; Clear Lake, Iowa
- Party: Democratic
- Spouses: Mary Elizabeth Wallace; (died 1916)
- Children: Susan Eleanor Williams^{(b. 1872; died 1948)}; Charles Ihrie Williams^{(b. 1876; died 1963)}; Harriet Gertrude Williams^{(b. 1878; died 1959)}; James Arthur Williams^{(b. 1880; died 1962)}; Paul Reginald Williams^{(b. 1882; died 1965)}; Octavia Emma Williams^{(b. 1885; died 1983)}; Mary Elizabeth (Kennedy)^{(b. 1887; died 1947)}; Marguerite Williams^{(b. 1891; died 1991)}; Leon G. Williams^{(b. 1894; died 1984)}

Charles Henry Williams (August 13, 1844 – February 2, 1922) was an American farmer and Democratic politician. He was a member of the Wisconsin State Senate for one term, representing the 13th senatorial district (Dodge County) from 1877 to 1879.

== Biography ==
Born in Burnett, in Dodge County, Wisconsin, he served in various local offices, and was Town Supervisor of Westford, Dodge County, Wisconsin, where he also resided during his senate term. He was elected to one term in the senate and was defeated seeking re-election in 1878.

He died in Minnesota in 1922.

== Family ==
In 1869, Williams married Mary Elizabeth Wallace at Fox Lake, Wisconsin, with whom he raised eleven children.

== Electoral history ==
Wisconsin Senate, 13th District Election, 1876
Party	Candidate	Votes	%	±%
General Election, November 7, 1876
Democratic	Charles H. Williams	5,728	62.36%	
Republican	Edward C. McFetridge	3,457	37.64%	
Plurality		2,271	24.73%	
Total votes		9,185	100.0%	
Democratic hold				

Wisconsin Senate, 13th District Election, 1878
Party	Candidate	Votes	%	±%
General Election, November 5, 1878
Republican	Edward C. McFetridge	3,437	45.36%	+7.72%
Democratic	Charles H. Williams (incumbent)	3,043	40.16%	−22.20%
Greenback	Lorenzo Merrill	1,097	14.48%	
Plurality		394	5.20%	-19.53%
Total votes		7,577	100.0%	-17.51%
Republican gain from Democratic		Swing	29.93%	

Wisconsin Senate
Preceded by John A. Barney	Member of the Wisconsin Senate from the 13th district 1877 – 1879	Succeeded by Edward C. McFetridge
