= John A. Barney =

19th century American politician

County Judge of Dodge County, Wisconsin
- In office January 3, 1898 – January 3, 1910
- Preceded by: C. A. Christiansen
- Succeeded by: Frank M. Lawrence

Member of the Wisconsin Senate from the 13th district
- In office January 4, 1875 – January 1, 1877
- Preceded by: Samuel D. Burchard
- Succeeded by: Charles H. Williams

Member of the Wisconsin State Assembly from the Dodge 3rd district
- In office January 7, 1889 – January 5, 1891
- Preceded by: Henry Spiering
- Succeeded by: William S. Schwefel

Personal details
- Born: June 14, 1840 Lenox, New York, U.S.
- Died: May 19, 1911 (aged 70) Mayville, Wisconsin, U.S.
- Resting place: Graceland Cemetery, Mayville, Wisconsin
- Party: Democratic
- Spouse: Henrietta Beeson (m. 1866–1911)
- Children: Edna Barney^{(died 1872)}; Effie Barney^{(died 1873)}; Maude G. (Engel)^{(b. 1867; died 1937)}; Hattie A. Barney^{(b. 1869; died 1891)}; Jessie Alice (von Trott)^{(b. 1874; died 1914)}

Military service
- Allegiance: United States
- Branch/service: United States Volunteers; Union Army
- Years of service: 1861–1863
- Rank: 1st Sergeant, USV; Brevet Captain, USV
- Unit: 10th Reg. Wis. Vol. Infantry
- Battles/wars: American Civil War: Battle of Perryville; Battle of Stone's River; Battle of Chickamauga

John Alonzo Barney (June 14, 1840 – May 19, 1911) was an American educator, politician, and judge. He served in the Wisconsin State Senate and Assembly, representing Dodge County, and was county judge for twelve years. He also served in the Union Army during the American Civil War.

== Early life ==
John A. Barney was born in Lenox, New York, in June 1840. He moved west with his parents in 1847, settling at Mayville, Wisconsin, and was educated there. After completing his primary school education, he studied law for two years, but interrupted his studies to volunteer for service in the American Civil War.

== Civil War service ==
Barney enlisted at the call for three-year volunteers near the start of the Civil War and was enrolled in Company B of the 10th Wisconsin Infantry Regiment. The regiment mustered into federal service in October 1861 and served in the western theater of the war. Barney was promoted to corporal, sergeant, and ultimately first sergeant. He was badly wounded at the Battle of Chickamauga, he was taken prisoner and his arm was amputated. He was quickly paroled and was discharged due to disability in November 1863. After the war, he received an honorary Brevet from Governor Lucius Fairchild to the rank of captain in recognition for his performance at the battles of Perryville and Chickamauga.

== Political and judicial career ==
Back in Mayville, he was appointed postmaster by President Andrew Johnson, but resigned after Grant's election. He went on to work as school superintendent for the eastern district of Dodge County from 1870 through 1874. In the Fall of 1874, he was elected on the Democratic Party ticket to the Wisconsin State Senate for Wisconsin's 13th State Senate district—then-comprising all of Dodge County. He served in the 1875 and 1876 legislative sessions and was not a candidate for re-election in 1876.

During the 46th United States Congress, Barney was hired as clerk of the U.S. House Committee on War Claims. The chairman of the committee was Wisconsin's Edward S. Bragg.

Back in Wisconsin, he worked as principal of the Mayville schools for 15 years and served in several local offices. He served as a justice of the peace and was a member and president of the Mayville village board. He was elected to the Wisconsin State Assembly in 1888, representing eastern Dodge County. He was elected county judge of Dodge County in the 1897 spring election, defeating incumbent judge C. A. Christiansen. He was re-elected in 1901 and 1905 but did not run for a fourth term in 1909.

He died at his home in Mayville a year after leaving office, on May 19, 1911.

== Personal life ==
Barney was active in the Independent Order of Odd Fellows and the Soldiers' Relief Association. John Barney married Henrietta Beeson in 1866. They had at least five children, but two died in infancy. Barney was survived by his wife and three daughters.

== Electoral history ==
=== Wisconsin Senate (1874) ===
Wisconsin Senate, 13th District Election, 1874
Party	Candidate	Votes	%	±%
General Election, November 3, 1874
Democratic	John A. Barney	4,819	67.94%	+16.19%
Republican	Vincent Roberts	2,274	32.06%	
Plurality		2,545	35.88%	+32.38%
Total votes		7,093	100.0%	+30.72%
Democratic hold				

=== Wisconsin Assembly (1888) ===
Wisconsin Assembly, Dodge 3rd District Election, 1888
Party	Candidate	Votes	%	±%
General Election, November 6, 1888
Democratic	John A. Barney	2,495	69.95%	+21.30%
Republican	D. M. Roberts	1,072	30.05%	
Plurality		1,423	39.89%	+37.19%
Total votes		3,567	100.0%	+55.76%
Democratic hold				

Wisconsin State Assembly
Preceded by Henry Spiering	Member of the Wisconsin State Assembly from the Dodge 3rd district January 7, 1889 – January 5, 1891	Succeeded by William S. Schwefel
Wisconsin Senate
Preceded by Samuel D. Burchard	Member of the Wisconsin Senate from the 13th district January 4, 1875 – January 1, 1877	Succeeded by Charles H. Williams
Legal offices
Preceded by C. A. Christiansen	County Judge of Dodge County, Wisconsin; January 3, 1898 – January 3, 1910	Succeeded by Frank M. Lawrence
