= Monroe Thompson =

American politician

Monroe Thompson was a member of the Wisconsin State Assembly in 1848. Thompson represented the 4th District of Dodge County, Wisconsin. He was a Whig.
