= John Lowth =

American politician

John Lowth (June 6, 1822 – August 3, 1877) was an American lawyer.

Born in County Meath, Ireland, Lowth settled in Pittsford, Vermont with his family. In 1843, he moved to East Troy, Wisconsin Territory, and two years later to Lowell, Wisconsin Territory. He studied law and was admitted to the Wisconsin bar. In 1850–1851, 1859, he served in the Wisconsin State Assembly. He also served as clerk of the Wisconsin Circuit Court for Juneau County, Wisconsin. He died in Juneau, Wisconsin.
