= William Geise =

American politician

William Geise was a member of the Wisconsin State Assembly in 1879. Other positions he held include member of the town board of supervisors of Portland, Dodge County, Wisconsin. He was a Democrat. Geise was born on January 26, 1820.
