= Emmet, Dodge County, Wisconsin =

Emmet, Wisconsin
- Town
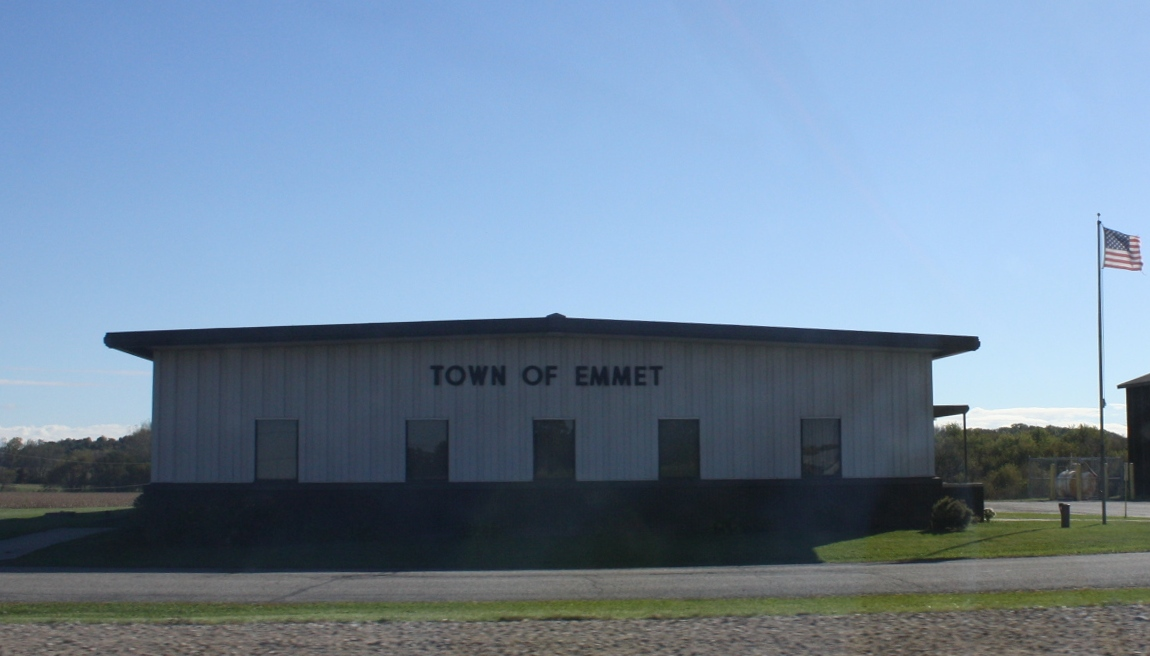
- Town hall

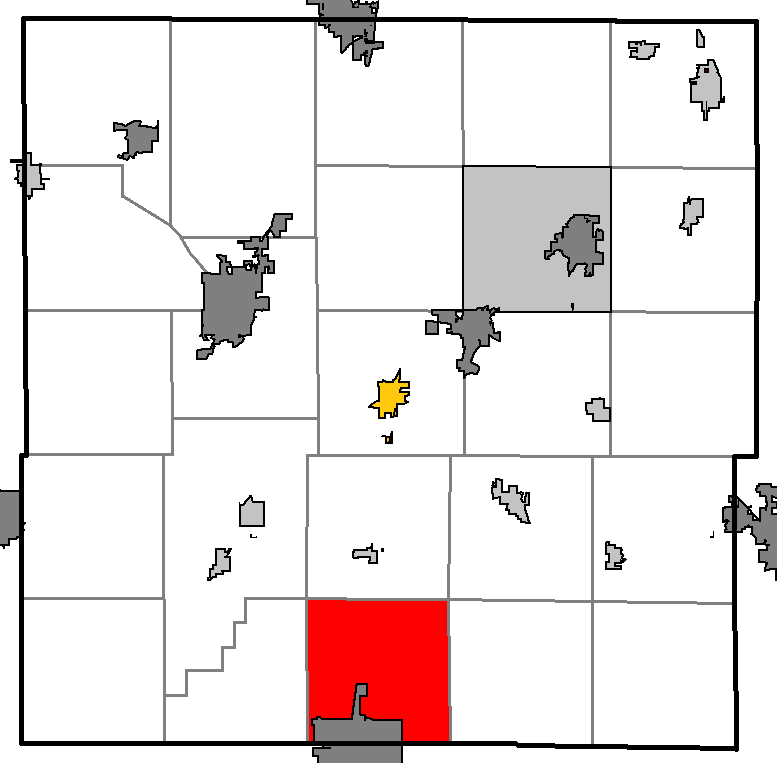
- Location of Emmet, within Dodge County
- Coordinates: 43°15′2″N 88°42′44″W
- Country: United States
- State: Wisconsin
- County: Dodge

Area
  - Total: 31.7 sq mi (82.2 km^{2})
  - Land: 31.7 sq mi (82.2 km^{2})
  - Water: 0 sq mi (0.0 km^{2})
- Elevation: 846 ft (258 m)

Population (2020)
  - Total: 1,310
  - Density: 41.3/sq mi (15.9/km^{2})
- Time zone: UTC-6 (Central (CST))
  - Summer (DST): UTC-5 (CDT)
- FIPS code: 55-24000
- GNIS feature ID: 1583165
- Website: https://emmettownship.com/

Emmet is a town in Dodge County, Wisconsin, United States. The population was 1,310 at the 2020 census.

== Geography ==
According to the United States Census Bureau, the town has a total area of 31.7 square miles (82.2 km^{2}), all land.

== Demographics ==
At the 2000 census there were 1,221 people, 414 households, and 343 families living in the town. The population density was 38.5 people per square mile (14.9/km^{2}). There were 427 housing units at an average density of 13.5 per square mile (5.2/km^{2}). The racial makeup of the town was 96.97% White, 0.08% African American, 0.41% Native American, 1.06% Asian, 0.74% from other races, and 0.74% from two or more races. Hispanic or Latino of any race were 1.80%.

Of the 414 households 41.8% had children under the age of 18 living with them, 73.4% were married couples living together, 4.6% had a female householder with no husband present, and 17.1% were non-families. 11.4% of households were one person and 4.8% were one person aged 65 or older. The average household size was 2.95 and the average family size was 3.21.

The age distribution was 28.1% under the age of 18, 7.4% from 18 to 24, 31.1% from 25 to 44, 24.8% from 45 to 64, and 8.6% 65 or older. The median age was 37 years. For every 100 females, there were 109.4 males. For every 100 females age 18 and over, there were 110.6 males.

The median household income was $51,154 and the median family income was $53,438. Males had a median income of $33,750 versus $24,457 for females. The per capita income for the town was $18,904. About 2.1% of families and 2.3% of the population were below the poverty line, including 1.6% of those under age 18 and 2.9% of those age 65 or over.
