= Patrick Roche (Wisconsin politician) =

American politician

Patrick Roche was a member of the Wisconsin State Assembly during the 1877 session. A Democrat, he represented the 4th District of Dodge County, Wisconsin. He was born on January 21, 1821, in County Wexford, Ireland.
