= Benjamin Sherman (Wisconsin politician) =

American politician (1836–1915)

Benjamin F. Sherman (November 30, 1836 – October 9, 1915) was a member of the Wisconsin State Assembly and the Wisconsin State Senate.

== Biography ==
Sherman was born on November 30, 1836, in Ann Arbor, Michigan. He later moved to Beaver Dam, Wisconsin, where he edited and published the Beaver Dam Argus. He died in Beaver Dam in 1915.

Sherman married Martha E. Schuart (1840–1917), and he was the father of James B. Sherman (1880–1955), who edited the Beaver Dam Argus from 1927 to 1950.

== Career ==
Sherman was a member of the Assembly in 1880. He later represented the 13th District during the 1883 and 1885 sessions. In addition, Sherman was Chairman of the Dodge County, Wisconsin Board of Supervisors from 1880 to 1884. He was a Democrat.
