= Lowell (town), Wisconsin =

Town in Dodge County, Wisconsin, United States

Lowell, Wisconsin
- Town
- Town of Lowell
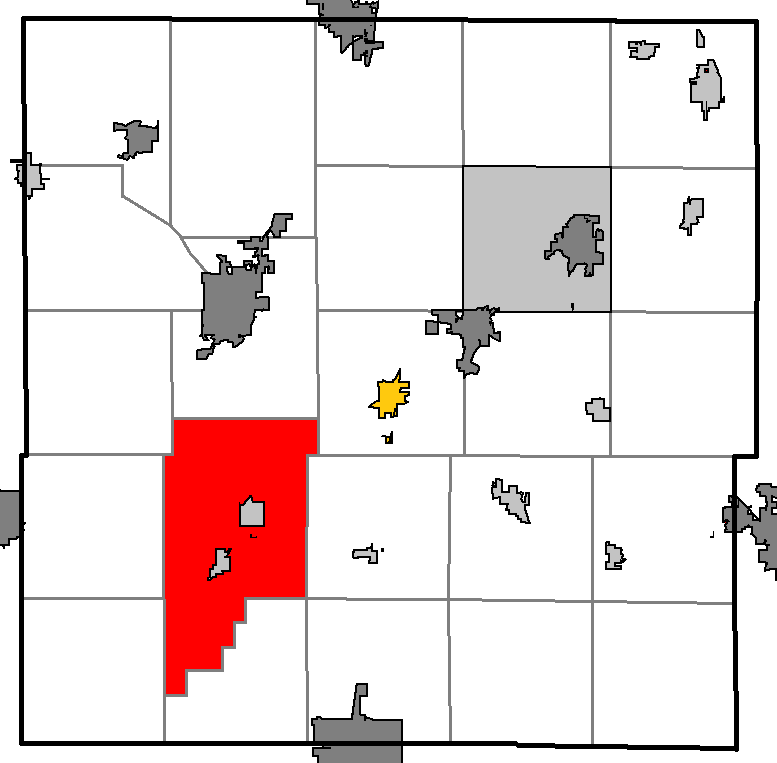
- Location of Lowell, within Dodge County
- Coordinates: 43°19′18″N 88°50′13″W
- Country: United States
- State: Wisconsin
- County: Dodge

Area
  - Total: 52.66 sq mi (136.4 km^{2})
  - Land: 51.8 sq mi (134 km^{2})
  - Water: 0.87 sq mi (2.3 km^{2})

Population (2020)
  - Total: 1,166
  - Density: 22.5/sq mi (8.69/km^{2})
- Time zone: UTC-6 (Central (CST))
  - Summer (DST): UTC-5 (CDT)
- Area code(s): 920 & 274
- GNIS feature ID: 1583601

Lowell is a town in Dodge County, Wisconsin, United States. The population was 1,166 at the 2020 census. The Village of Lowell and the unincorporated community of North Lowell are located in the town.

== Geography ==
According to the United States Census Bureau, the town has a total area of 51.9 square miles (134.4 km^{2}), of which 51.4 square miles (133.2 km^{2}) is land and 0.4 square mile (1.2 km^{2}) (0.87%) is water.

== Demographics ==
As of the census of 2000, there were 1,169 people, 433 households, and 333 families living in the town. The population density was 22.7 people per square mile (8.8/km^{2}). There were 456 housing units at an average density of 8.9 per square mile (3.4/km^{2}). The racial makeup of the town was 97.52% White, 0.26% Black or African American, 0.43% Native American, 0.17% Asian, 1.03% from other races, and 0.60% from two or more races. 2.48% of the population were Hispanic or Latino of any race.

There were 433 households, out of which 35.6% had children under the age of 18 living with them, 66.5% were married couples living together, 6.2% had a female householder with no husband present, and 22.9% were non-families. 16.9% of all households were made up of individuals, and 5.8% had someone living alone who was 65 years of age or older. The average household size was 2.70 and the average family size was 3.01.

In the town, the population was spread out, with 25.6% under the age of 18, 8.1% from 18 to 24, 32.2% from 25 to 44, 22.9% from 45 to 64, and 11.1% who were 65 years of age or older. The median age was 37 years. For every 100 females, there were 110.3 males. For every 100 females age 18 and over, there were 117.0 males.

The median income for a household in the town was $47,833, and the median income for a family was $51,250. Males had a median income of $33,098 versus $23,889 for females. The per capita income for the town was $19,729. About 5.2% of families and 6.8% of the population were below the poverty line, including 7.7% of those under age 18 and 10.5% of those age 65 or over.
