= Hustisford (town), Wisconsin =

Hustisford, Wisconsin
- Town
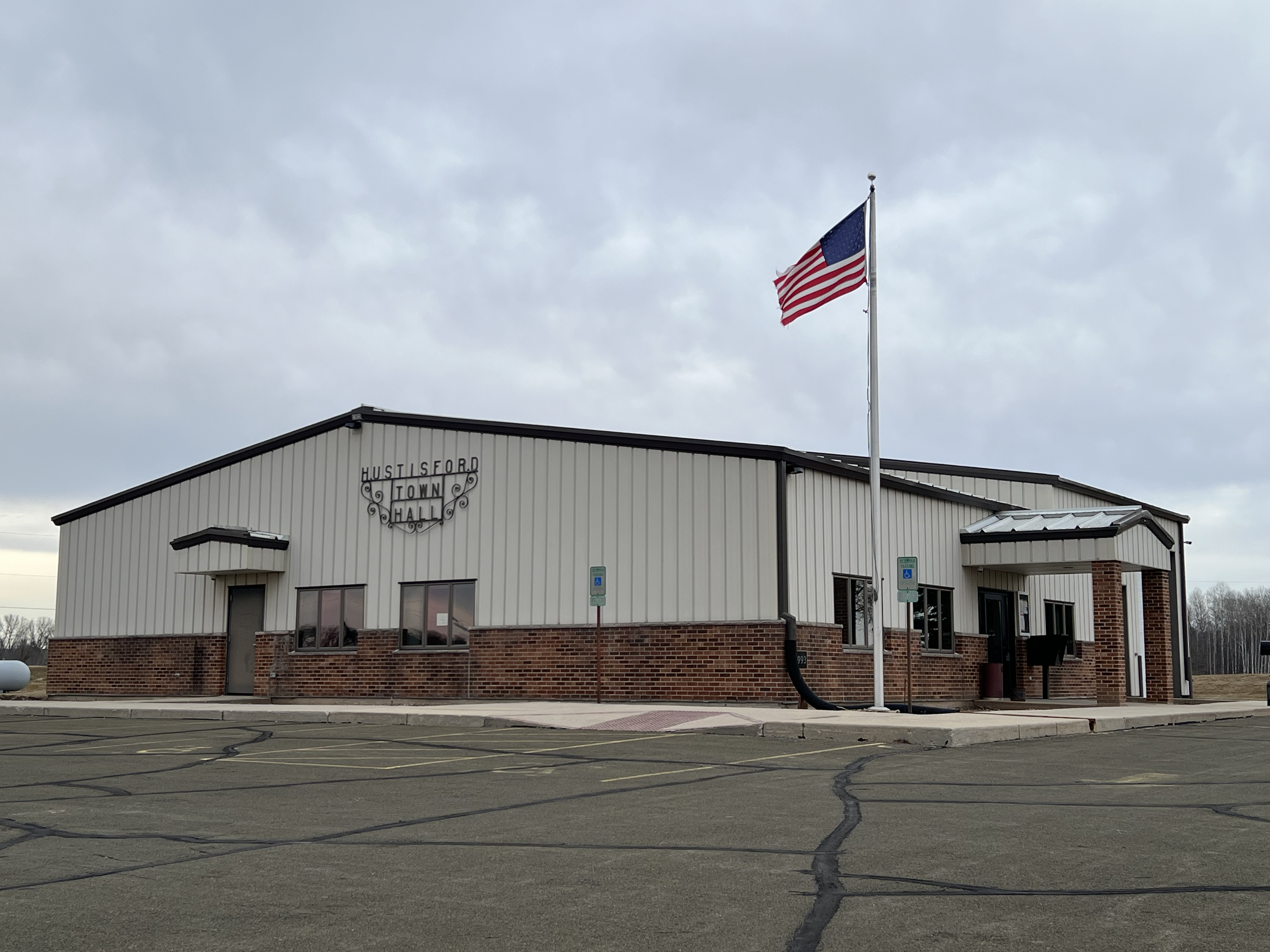
- Hustisford town hall

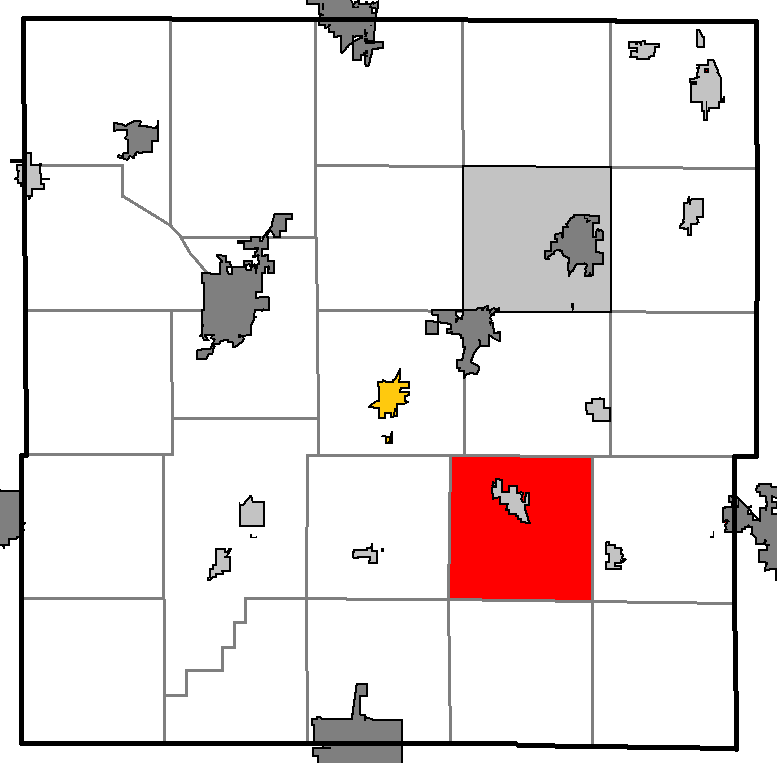
- Location of Hustisford, within Dodge County
- Coordinates: 43°19′06″N 88°35′45″W
- Country: United States
- State: Wisconsin
- County: Dodge

Area
  - Total: 34.9 sq mi (90.5 km^{2})
  - Land: 33.7 sq mi (87.4 km^{2})
  - Water: 1.2 sq mi (3.1 km^{2})
- Elevation: 846 ft (258 m)

Population (2020)
  - Total: 1,357
  - Density: 40.2/sq mi (15.5/km^{2})
- Time zone: UTC-6 (Central (CST))
  - Summer (DST): UTC-5 (CDT)
- Website: https://townofhustisford.gov/

Hustisford is a town in Dodge County, Wisconsin, United States. The population was 1,357 at the 2020 census. Most of the town residents live in the village of Hustisford, within the town.

== History ==
The community was named for John Hustis, a pioneer settler.

== Geography ==
According to the United States Census Bureau, the town has a total area of 34.9 square miles (90.5 km^{2}), of which 33.7 square miles (87.4 km^{2}) is land and 1.2 square miles (3.1 km^{2}) (3.44%) is water.

== Demographics ==
As of the census of 2000, there were 1,379 people, 492 households, and 411 families residing in the town. The population density was 40.9 people per square mile (15.8/km^{2}). There were 546 housing units at an average density of 16.2 per square mile (6.2/km^{2}). The racial makeup of the town was 99.49% White, 0.15% Native American, 0.07% Asian, 0.22% from other races, and 0.07% from two or more races. 0.94% of the population were Hispanic or Latino of any race.

There were 492 households, out of which 34.3% had children under the age of 18 living with them, 73.4% were married couples living together, 6.9% had a female householder with no husband present, and 16.3% were non-families. 12.4% of all households were made up of individuals, and 5.1% had someone living alone who was 65 years of age or older. The average household size was 2.80 and the average family size was 3.06.

In the town, the population was spread out, with 25.7% under the age of 18, 7.4% from 18 to 24, 27.6% from 25 to 44, 27.5% from 45 to 64, and 11.9% who were 65 years of age or older. The median age was 40 years. For every 100 females, there were 101.3 males. For every 100 females age 18 and over, there were 103.4 males.

The median income for a household in the town was $60,086, and the median income for a family was $62,112. Males had a median income of $38,224 versus $26,029 for females. The per capita income for the town was $23,965. About 4.6% of families and 5.5% of the population were below the poverty line, including 7.0% of those under age 18 and 9.9% of those age 65 or over.
