= Elba, Wisconsin =

- Town
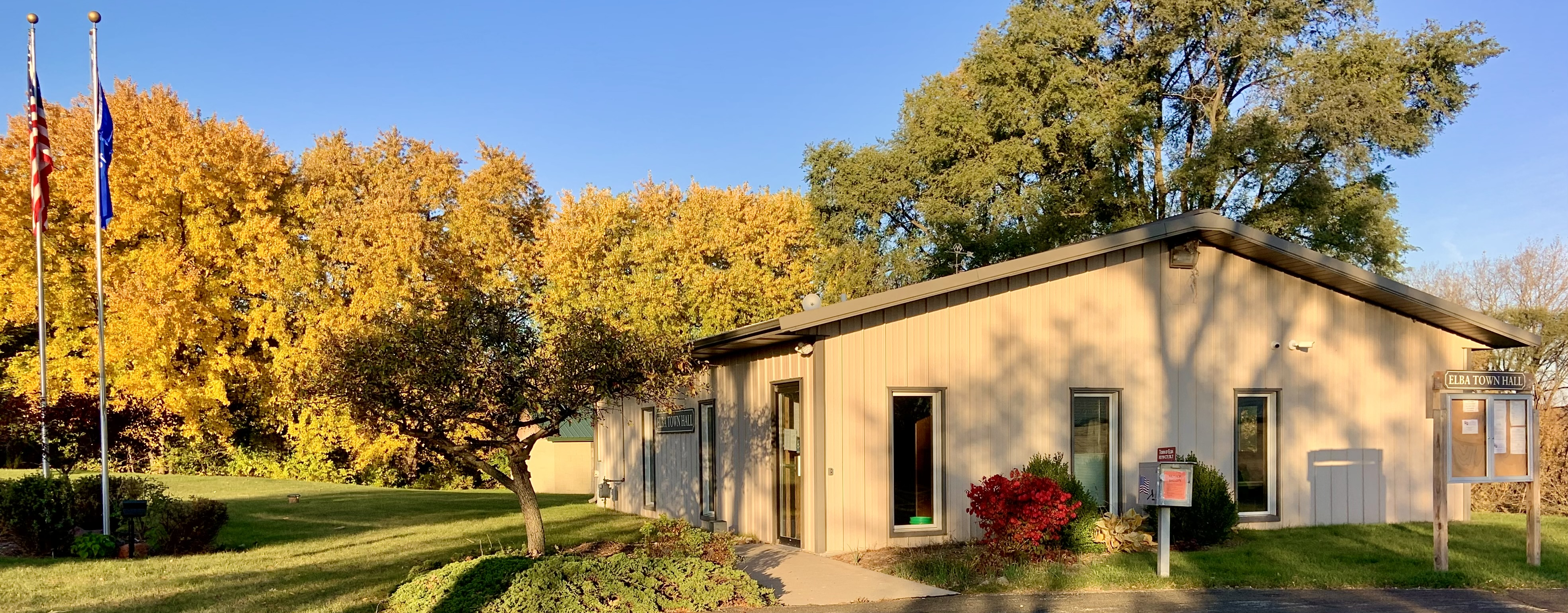
- Town hall

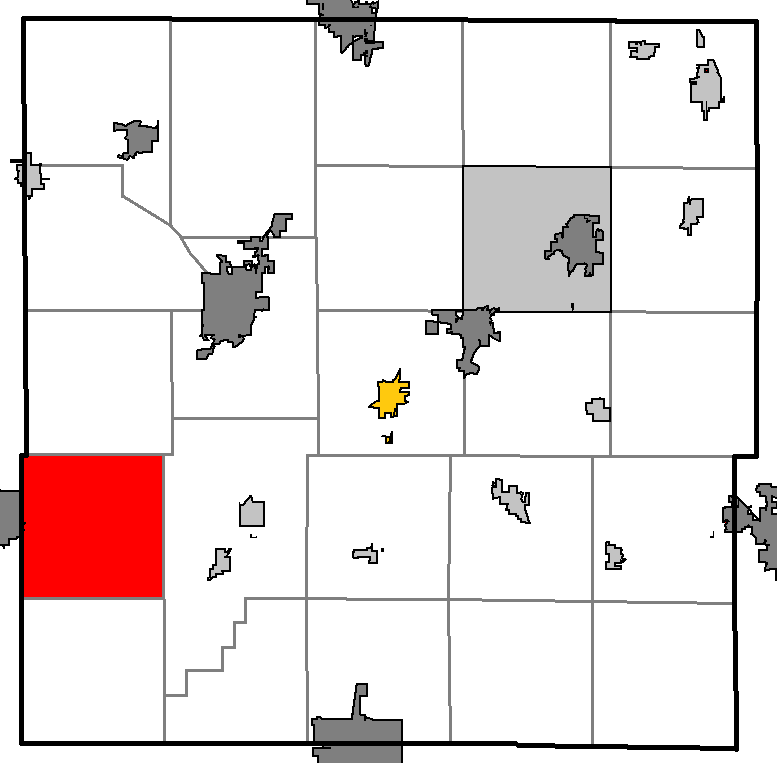
- Location of Elba, within Dodge County
- Coordinates: 43°19′36″N 88°57′8″W
- Country: United States
- State: Wisconsin
- County: Dodge

Area
  - Total: 35.5 sq mi (91.9 km^{2})
  - Land: 35.4 sq mi (91.8 km^{2})
  - Water: 0.039 sq mi (0.1 km^{2})
- Elevation: 869 ft (265 m)

Population (2020)
  - Total: 1,041
  - Density: 29.4/sq mi (11.3/km^{2})
- Time zone: UTC-6 (Central (CST))
  - Summer (DST): UTC-5 (CDT)
- FIPS code: 55-23000
- GNIS feature ID: 1583141
- Website: https://townofelba.com/

Elba is a town in Dodge County, Wisconsin, United States. The population was 1,041 at the 2020 census. The unincorporated communities of Astico and Danville are located in the town.

== Geography ==
According to the United States Census Bureau, the town has a total area of 35.5 square miles (91.9 km^{2}), of which 35.4 square miles (91.8 km^{2}) is land and 0.1 square mile (0.1 km^{2}) (0.14%) is water.

== Demographics ==
At the 2000 census there were 1,086 people, 385 households, and 306 families living in the town. The population density was 30.6 people per square mile (11.8/km^{2}). There were 397 housing units at an average density of 11.2 per square mile (4.3/km^{2}). The racial makeup of the town was 98.53% White, 0.64% African American, 0.46% Native American, 0.28% from other races, and 0.09% from two or more races. Hispanic or Latino of any race were 1.57%.

Of the 385 households 36.6% had children under the age of 18 living with them, 69.1% were married couples living together, 6.5% had a female householder with no husband present, and 20.3% were non-families. 14.8% of households were one person and 6.2% were one person aged 65 or older. The average household size was 2.82 and the average family size was 3.13.

The age distribution was 26.4% under the age of 18, 6.6% from 18 to 24, 28.6% from 25 to 44, 29.1% from 45 to 64, and 9.2% 65 or older. The median age was 39 years. For every 100 females, there were 105.3 males. For every 100 females age 18 and over, there were 105.4 males.

The median household income was $57,132 and the median family income was $59,583. Males had a median income of $37,279 versus $25,313 for females. The per capita income for the town was $22,055. About 2.3% of families and 3.6% of the population were below the poverty line, including 4.7% of those under age 18 and 6.0% of those age 65 or over.
