= Clyman, Wisconsin =

- village
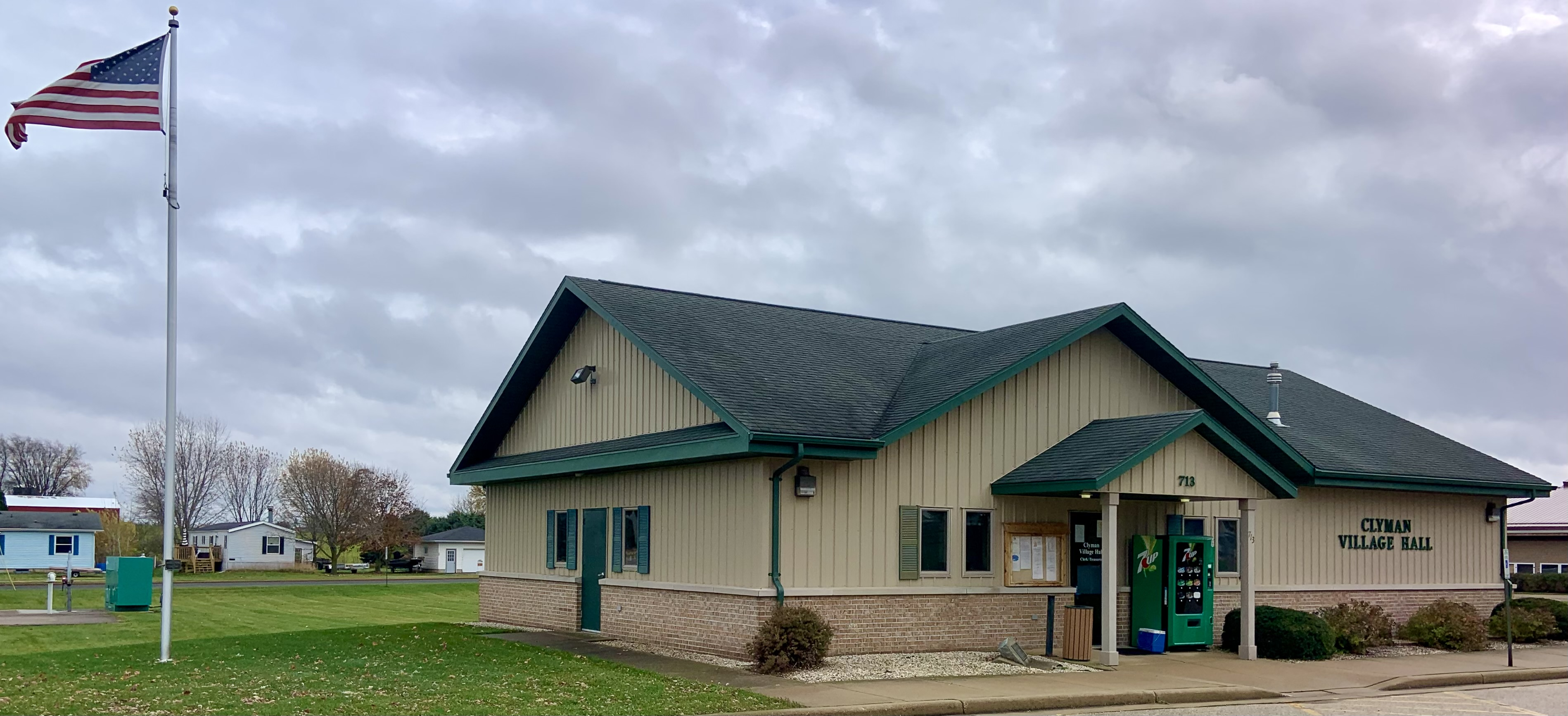
- Town hall

- Location of Clyman in Dodge County, Wisconsin.
- Coordinates: 43°20′8″N 88°43′17″W
- Country: United States
- State: Wisconsin
- County: Dodge

Area
  - Total: 0.37 sq mi (0.97 km^{2})
  - Land: 0.37 sq mi (0.97 km^{2})
  - Water: 0 sq mi (0.00 km^{2})
- Elevation: 929 ft (283 m)

Population (2020)
  - Total: 397
  - Density: 1,100/sq mi (410/km^{2})
- Time zone: UTC-6 (Central (CST))
  - Summer (DST): UTC-5 (CDT)
- Area code: 920
- FIPS code: 55-15925
- GNIS feature ID: 1582991
- Website: http://www.villageofclyman.org

Clyman is a village in Dodge County, Wisconsin, United States. The population was 397 at the 2020 census. The village is surrounded by the Town of Clyman.

== History ==
A post office called Clyman has been in operation since 1849. The village was named for James Clyman, a pioneer and frontiersman.

== Geography ==
Clyman is located at 43°18′46″N 88°43′11″W (43.313002, -88.719895).

According to the United States Census Bureau, the village has a total area of 0.37 square miles (0.96 km^{2}), all land.

== Demographics ==
Historical population
Census	Pop.	Note	%±
1930	200		—
1940	230		15.0%
1950	250		8.7%
1960	259		3.6%
1970	328		26.6%
1980	317		−3.4%
1990	370		16.7%
2000	388		4.9%
2010	422		8.8%
2020	397		−5.9%
U.S. Decennial Census

=== 2010 census ===
As of the census of 2010, there were 422 people, 163 households, and 111 families living in the village. The population density was 1,140.5 inhabitants per square mile (440.3/km^{2}). There were 177 housing units at an average density of 478.4 per square mile (184.7/km^{2}). The racial makeup of the village was 95.3% White, 0.5% African American, 1.2% Native American, 0.2% Asian, and 2.8% from two or more races. Hispanic or Latino of any race were 4.7% of the population.

There were 163 households, of which 35.0% had children under the age of 18 living with them, 51.5% were married couples living together, 7.4% had a female householder with no husband present, 9.2% had a male householder with no wife present, and 31.9% were non-families. 23.9% of all households were made up of individuals, and 9.2% had someone living alone who was 65 years of age or older. The average household size was 2.59 and the average family size was 3.03.

The median age in the village was 38.9 years. 23.5% of residents were under the age of 18; 10.5% were between the ages of 18 and 24; 27.4% were from 25 to 44; 27.9% were from 45 to 64; and 10.7% were 65 years of age or older. The gender makeup of the village was 52.1% male and 47.9% female.

=== 2000 census ===
As of the census of 2000, there were 388 people, 153 households, and 104 families living in the village. The population density was 1,605.2 people per square mile (624.2/km^{2}). There were 163 housing units at an average density of 674.4 per square mile (262.2/km^{2}). The racial makeup of the village was 95.88% White, 1.03% Native American, 1.80% from other races, and 1.29% from two or more races. 4.64% of the population were Hispanic or Latino of any race.

There were 153 households, out of which 35.3% had children under the age of 18 living with them, 54.2% were married couples living together, 7.8% had a female householder with no husband present, and 31.4% were non-families. 26.1% of all households were made up of individuals, and 8.5% had someone living alone who was 65 years of age or older. The average household size was 2.54 and the average family size was 3.05.

In the village, the population was spread out, with 27.6% under the age of 18, 8.0% from 18 to 24, 33.8% from 25 to 44, 17.3% from 45 to 64, and 13.4% who were 65 years of age or older. The median age was 36 years. For every 100 females, there were 115.6 males. For every 100 females age 18 and over, there were 108.1 males.

The median income for a household in the village was $40,000, and the median income for a family was $50,625. Males had a median income of $34,821 versus $23,667 for females. The per capita income for the village was $16,346. About 4.9% of families and 6.4% of the population were below the poverty line, including 9.4% of those under age 18 and 4.4% of those age 65 or over.

== Notable person ==
- Scott Fitzgerald – U.S. representative, former Majority Leader of the Wisconsin Senate
