= Lowell, Wisconsin =

- Village
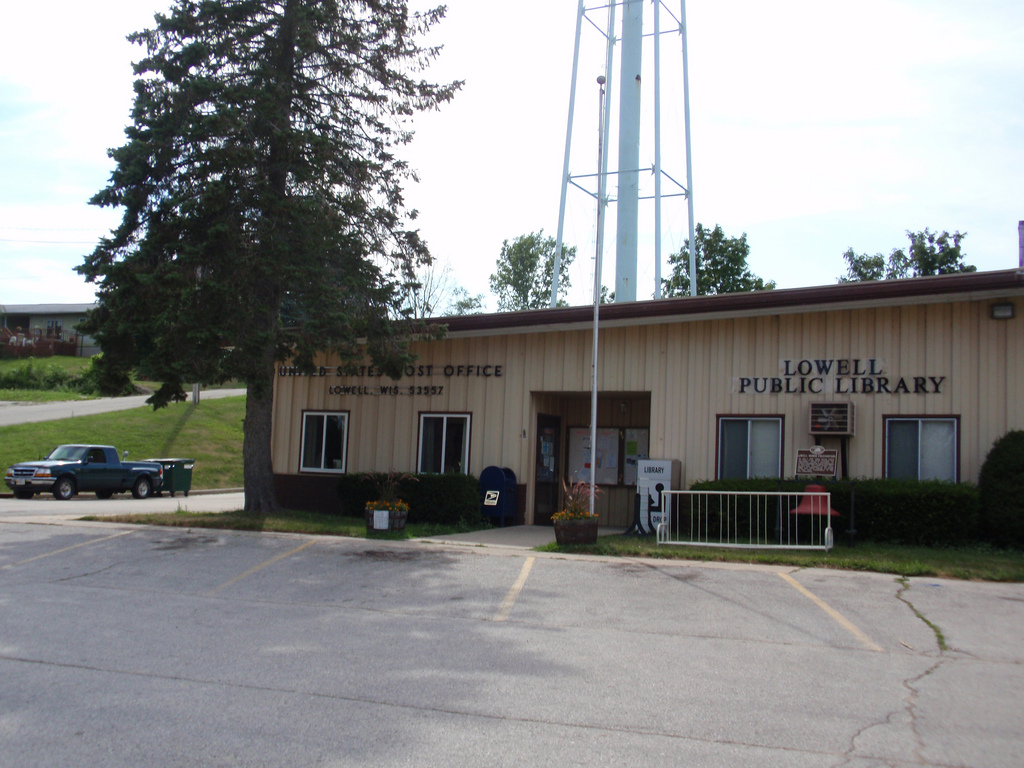
- Post office and public library

- Location of Lowell in Dodge County, Wisconsin
- Coordinates: 43°19′45″N 88°49′44″W
- Country: United States
- State: Wisconsin
- County: Dodge

Area
  - Total: 1.05 sq mi (2.71 km^{2})
  - Land: 0.99 sq mi (2.57 km^{2})
  - Water: 0.054 sq mi (0.14 km^{2})
- Elevation: 830 ft (250 m)

Population (2020)
  - Total: 309
  - Density: 311/sq mi (120/km^{2})
- Time zone: UTC-6 (Central (CST))
  - Summer (DST): UTC-5 (CDT)
- FIPS code: 55-45975
- GNIS feature ID: 1568711
- Website: villageoflowellwi.com

Lowell is a village in Dodge County, Wisconsin, United States, along the Beaver Dam River. The population was 309 at the 2020 census. The village is located within the Town of Lowell.

== Geography ==
Lowell is located at 43°20′20″N 88°49′13″W (43.338909, -88.82055).

According to the United States Census Bureau, the village has a total area of 1.05 square miles (2.72 km^{2}), of which 1.00 square mile (2.59 km^{2}) is land and 0.05 square miles (0.13 km^{2}) is water.

== Demographics ==
Historical population
Census	Pop.	Note	%±
1880	400		—
1890	304		−24.0%
1900	333		9.5%
1910	318		−4.5%
1920	293		−7.9%
1930	288		−1.7%
1940	282		−2.1%
1950	319		13.1%
1960	341		6.9%
1970	322		−5.6%
1980	326		1.2%
1990	300		−8.0%
2000	366		22.0%
2010	340		−7.1%
2020	309		−9.1%
U.S. Decennial Census

=== 2010 census ===
As of the census of 2010, there were 340 people, 136 households, and 89 families living in the village. The population density was 340.0 inhabitants per square mile (131.3/km^{2}). There were 163 housing units at an average density of 163.0 per square mile (62.9/km^{2}). The racial makeup of the village was 99.4% White, 0.3% African American, and 0.3% Native American. Hispanic or Latino people of any race were 1.5% of the population.

There were 136 households, of which 31.6% had children under the age of 18 living with them, 50.0% were married couples living together, 10.3% had a female householder with no husband present, 5.1% had a male householder with no wife present, and 34.6% were non-families. 27.9% of all households were made up of individuals, and 11% had someone living alone who was 65 years of age or older. The average household size was 2.50 and the average family size was 3.06.

The median age in the village was 42.3 years. 21.5% of residents were under the age of 18; 6.5% were between the ages of 18 and 24; 28.3% were from 25 to 44; 31% were from 45 to 64; and 12.9% were 65 years of age or older. The gender makeup of the village was 50.6% male and 49.4% female.

=== 2000 census ===
As of the census of 2000, there were 366 people, 142 households, and 93 families living in the village. The population density was 368.1 people per square mile (142.7/km^{2}). There were 153 housing units at an average density of 153.9 per square mile (59.7/km^{2}). The racial makeup of the village was 96.17% White, 0.27% Black or African American, 1.09% Asian, 1.64% from other races, and 0.82% from two or more races. 3.28% of the population were Hispanic or Latino of any race.

There were 142 households, out of which 37.3% had children under the age of 18 living with them, 51.4% were married couples living together, 8.5% had a female householder with no husband present, and 34.5% were non-families. 27.5% of all households were made up of individuals, and 14.1% had someone living alone who was 65 years of age or older. The average household size was 2.58 and the average family size was 3.18.

In the village, the population was spread out, with 30.3% under the age of 18, 5.7% from 18 to 24, 32.2% from 25 to 44, 21.6% from 45 to 64, and 10.1% who were 65 years of age or older. The median age was 34 years. For every 100 females, there were 104.5 males. For every 100 females age 18 and over, there were 104.0 males.

The median income for a household in the village was $43,594, and the median income for a family was $46,750. Males had a median income of $35,694 versus $23,333 for females. The per capita income for the village was $14,393. About 4.8% of families and 9.5% of the population were below the poverty line, including 14.7% of those under age 18 and 6.3% of those age 65 or over.

== Churches ==
There are three Churches in the village of Lowell. Salem Lutheran (Wisconsin Synod), Lowell United Methodist, and Lowell United Church of Christ.

== Notable natives and residents ==
- Milton H. Erickson, psychiatrist
- Charles A. Kading, Wisconsin politician
- John Lowth, Wisconsin politician
