= Bachhuber =

Bachhuber is a German surname.

Notable people with this surname include:

- Andrew Bachhuber (1856–?), American farmer and politician
- Frank E. Bachhuber (1884–1939), American politician
- Martin Bachhuber (born 1955), German politician
- Max Bachhuber (1832–1879), American farmer and politician
- Nina Lola Bachhuber (born 1971), German artist
- Ruth Bachhuber Doyle (October 14, 1916 – May 6, 2006), American politician
