= Max Bachhuber =

19th century American politician

Member of the Wisconsin State Assembly
- In office January 4, 1875 – January 3, 1876
- Preceded by: Jacob Bodden
- Succeeded by: Charles E. Kite
- Constituency: Dodge 4th district
- In office January 4, 1864 – January 2, 1865
- Preceded by: Albert Burtch
- Succeeded by: Peter Peters
- Constituency: Dodge 4th district
- In office January 2, 1860 – January 7, 1861
- Preceded by: John C. Bishop
- Succeeded by: Jacob Bodden
- Constituency: Dodge 2nd district

Personal details
- Born: December 13, 1832 Regensburg, Kingdom of Bavaria
- Died: February 2, 1879 (aged 46) LeRoy, Wisconsin, U.S.
- Resting place: Old Saint Marys Catholic Cemetery, Mayville, Wisconsin
- Party: Democratic
- Spouse: Theresia Engle (m. 1856–1879)
- Children: Andrew Bachhuber^{(b. 1856; died 1922)}; Crescentia (Bauer)^{(b. 1858; died 1937)}; Mary (Lehner)^{(b. 1860; died 1930)}; Emeron Bachhuber^{(b. 1862; died 1870)}; Max M. J. Bachhuber^{(b. 1864; died 1928)}; Katherine (Fell)^{(b. 1866; died 1944)}; John G. Bachhuber^{(b. 1867; died 1912)}; Louis M. Bachhuber^{(b. 1870; died 1927)}; Albert Frank Bachhuber^{(b. 1872; died 1936)}; Emilia Theresia Bachhuber^{(b. 1874; died 1877)}; Alphons Eugene Bachhuber^{(b. 1877; died 1938)}; Charles Hugo Bachhuber^{(b. 1879; died 1959)}
- Relatives: Frank E. Bachhuber (grandson); Ruth Bachhuber Doyle (great-granddaughter); Jim Doyle (great-great-grandson)
- Occupation: Farmer

Maximilian J. "Max" Bachhuber (December 13, 1832 – February 2, 1879) was a German American immigrant, farmer, businessman, and politician. He served three terms in the Wisconsin State Assembly, representing Dodge County. His son, Andrew Bachhuber, grandson, Frank E. Bachhuber, and great-granddaughter, Ruth Bachhuber Doyle, also served in the Wisconsin State Assembly. He was also a great-great-grandfather of Jim Doyle, the 44th governor of Wisconsin.

== Biography ==
Max Bachhuber was born in the Kingdom of Bavaria in December 1832. As a child, he emigrated to the United States with his parents, settling in what is now Addison, Wisconsin, in 1846. He went to work in Milwaukee in 1850, then purchased a farm in LeRoy, Wisconsin, in 1855, where he remained for much of the rest of his life. In addition to his farm, he operated a store in the Farmersville community, where he was also postmaster for nine years.

He was elected to the Wisconsin State Assembly three times running on the Democratic Party ticket. He served in the 1860, 1864, and 1875 legislative sessions.

Bachhuber died on February 2, 1879, and was survived by his wife and ten children.

His son Andrew Bachhuber, grandson Frank E. Bachhuber, and great-granddaughter Ruth Bachhuber Doyle also served in the Wisconsin State Assembly. Jim Doyle, the 44th governor of Wisconsin, was his great-great-grandson.

Wisconsin State Assembly
Preceded by John C. Bishop	Member of the Wisconsin State Assembly from the Dodge 2nd district January 2, 1860 – January 7, 1861	Succeeded by Jacob Bodden
Preceded by Albert Burtch	Member of the Wisconsin State Assembly from the Dodge 4th district January 4, 1864 – January 2, 1865	Succeeded by Peter Peters
Preceded by Jacob Bodden	Member of the Wisconsin State Assembly from the Dodge 4th district January 4, 1875 – January 3, 1876	Succeeded by Charles E. Kite
