= Frank S. Bauer =

American politician

Frank S. Bauer (July 9, 1856 – August 16, 1936) was an American businessman, farmer, and politician.

Bauer was born on a farm in Leroy, Wisconsin. He owned a general store in Knowles, Wisconsin and served as postmaster. Bauer served in the Wisconsin Assembly from 1905 to 1909 and was a Democrat. In 1913, Bauer moved to a farm in Biron, Wisconsin. He served on the Biron Trustee Board and also served as the Biron Village President. Bauer also served on the school board and was the school board clerk. Bauer died at his home in Biron, Wisconsin after suffering a heart attack.
