= Jim Doyle =

Governor of Wisconsin from 2003 to 2011

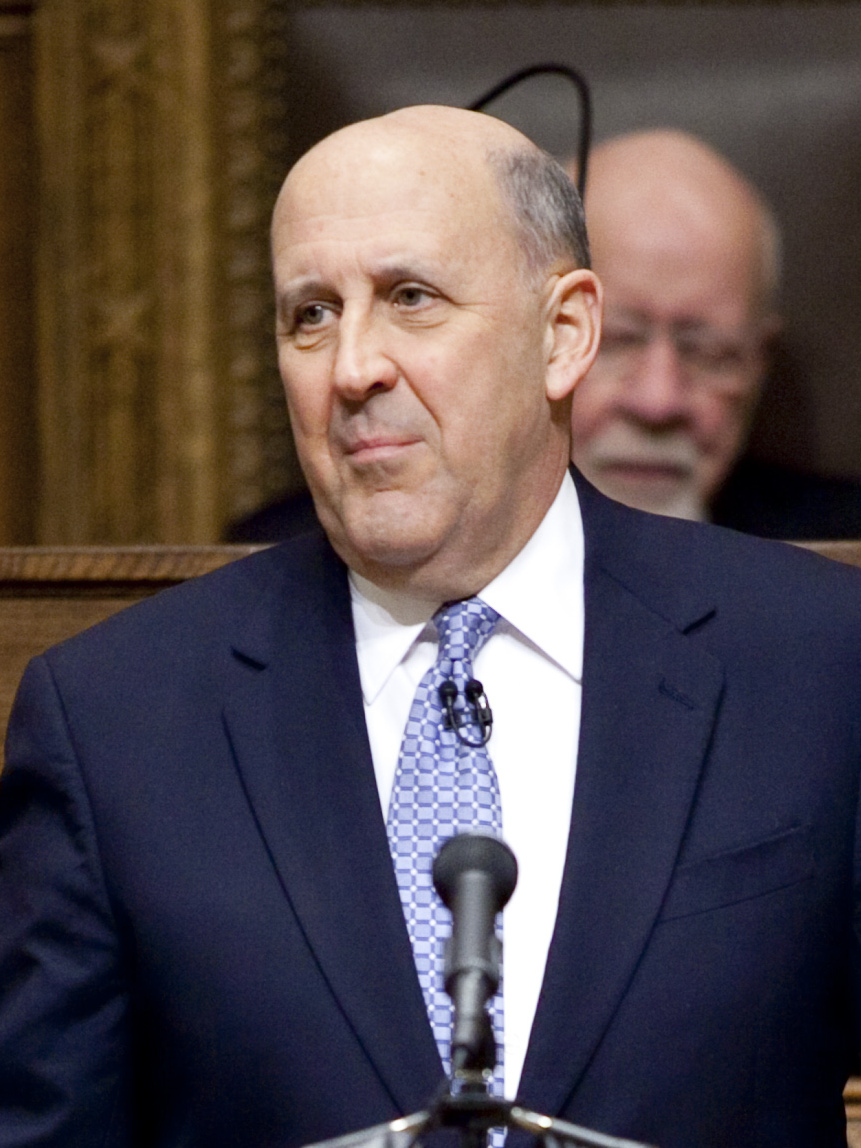
- Doyle in 2009

44th Governor of Wisconsin
- In office January 6, 2003 – January 3, 2011
- Lieutenant: Barbara Lawton
- Preceded by: Scott McCallum
- Succeeded by: Scott Walker

41st Attorney General of Wisconsin
- In office January 7, 1991 – January 6, 2003
- Governor: Tommy Thompson; Scott McCallum
- Preceded by: Don Hanaway
- Succeeded by: Peg Lautenschlager

District Attorney of Dane County
- In office January 3, 1977 – January 3, 1982
- Preceded by: Humphrey Lynch
- Succeeded by: Harold Harlowe

Personal details
- Born: James Edward Doyle, Jr. November 23, 1945 (age 80) Washington, D.C., U.S.
- Party: Democratic
- Spouse: Jessica Laird
- Children: 2
- Relatives: James Doyle (father); Ruth Bachhuber (mother)
- Education: Stanford University (attended); University of Wisconsin, Madison (BA); Harvard University (JD)

James Edward Doyle Jr. (born November 23, 1945) is an American attorney and politician who served as the 44th governor of Wisconsin from 2003 to 2011. A member of the Democratic Party, he previously served as the 41st attorney general of Wisconsin from 1991 to 2003.

Doyle was born in Washington, D.C., and grew up in Madison, Wisconsin. After graduating from the University of Wisconsin–Madison and Harvard Law School, he worked as a district attorney and in private practice. He was first elected governor in 2002, narrowly defeating incumbent Republican governor Scott McCallum, and was re-elected in 2006 by a wider margin, defeating congressman Mark Green.

== Early life and education ==
Jim Doyle was born on November 23, 1945, in Washington, D.C., the son of Ruth Bachhuber Doyle and James Edward Doyle, who were influential leaders of the post-1946 Democratic Party of Wisconsin. His father ran unsuccessfully for governor in 1954 and was appointed as a federal judge in 1965, while his mother was the first woman from Dane County, Wisconsin, to be elected to the Wisconsin State Assembly in 1948. His maternal grandfather, Frank E. Bachhuber, represented Marathon County in the Assembly in the 1930s; his great-grandfather and great-great-grandfather, Andrew Bachhuber and Max Bachhuber, represented Dodge County in the Assembly in the 19th century.

Doyle graduated from Madison West High School in 1963 and attended Stanford University for three years, then returned to Madison to finish his senior year at the University of Wisconsin–Madison. After graduating from college and inspired by John F. Kennedy's call to public service, Doyle worked as a teacher with his wife, Jessica Doyle in Tunisia as part of the Peace Corps from 1967 to 1969. In 1972, Doyle earned his Juris Doctor from Harvard Law School. He then moved to the Navajo Indian Reservation in Chinle, Arizona, where he worked as an attorney in a federal legal services office.

== Early political career ==
In 1975, Doyle returned to Madison and served three terms as Dane County district attorney from 1977 to 1982. After leaving that office, he spent eight years in private practice. Doyle was elected attorney general of Wisconsin in 1990 and reelected in 1994 and 1998. Between 1997 and 1998, he served as the president of the National Association of Attorneys General. During his twelve years as attorney general, Doyle was considered tough on crime, but not unsympathetic to its causes. He also gained recognition as a result of several successful lawsuits against tobacco companies in the state.

== Governor of Wisconsin (2003–2011) ==
=== Elections ===
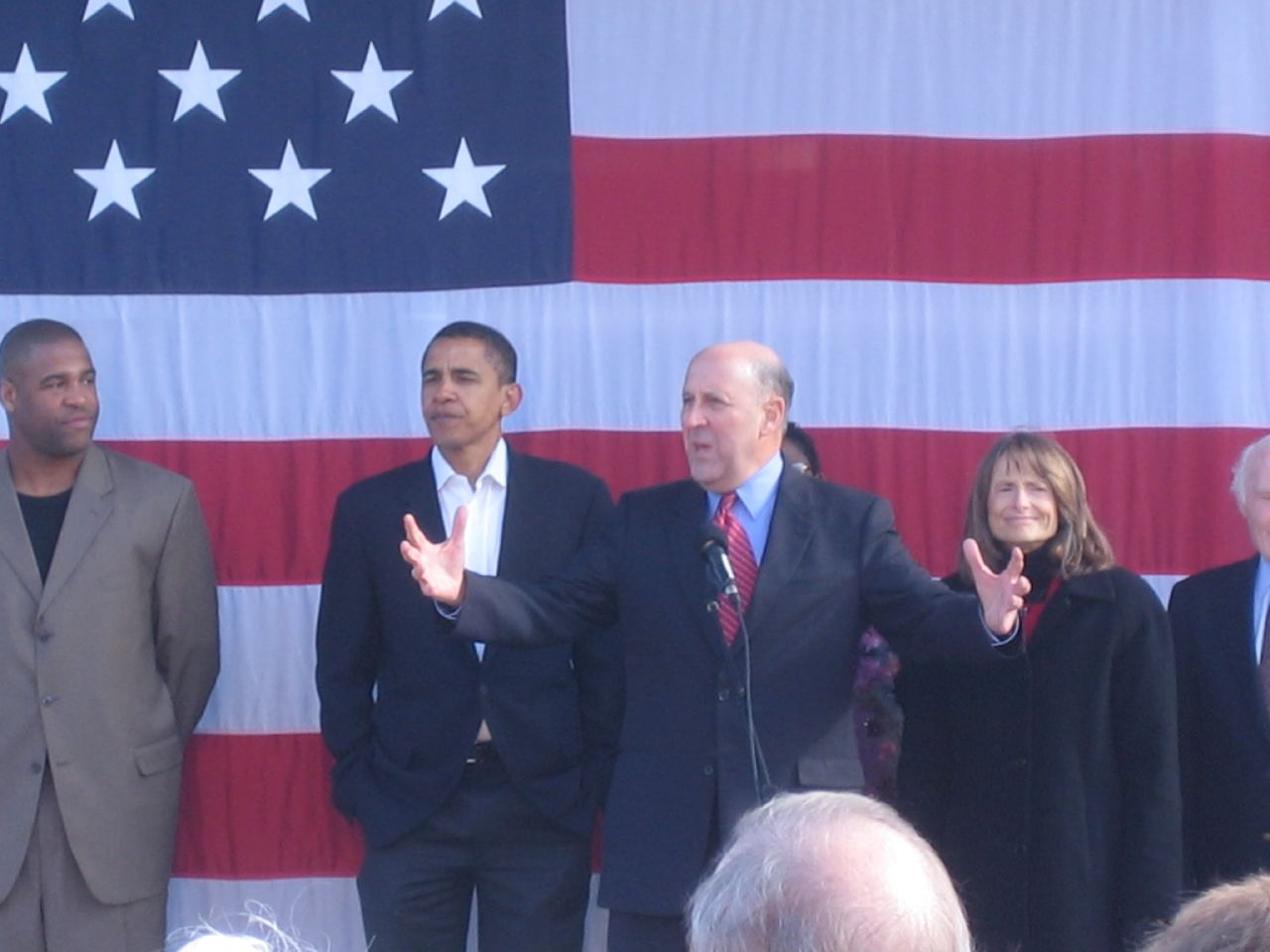
Doyle campaigning with then-Senator Barack Obama and other Democrats in 2006

Doyle ran against Republican Scott McCallum, the former lieutenant governor who had assumed the office of governor in 2001 after Tommy Thompson left to become Secretary of Health and Human Services in the George W. Bush administration. On election day, Doyle defeated McCallum by over four percent of the vote, becoming the first Democratic governor in the state since Anthony Earl was defeated in 1986. Libertarian nominee Ed Thompson (brother of Tommy) was publicly critical of the negative campaigning of both major party candidates and garnered 10% of the vote.

Doyle defeated Republican Congressman Mark Green in 2006. Doyle topped Green 53% to 45% in a year in which no incumbent Democratic governor, senator, or congressman lost their reelection bid. During the campaign, Doyle was dogged by charges that Georgia Thompson, a state employee, had steered a travel agency contract to a firm whose principals had donated $20,000 to his campaign. Thompson was convicted in federal court in late 2006, which was reversed by the 7th Circuit Court of Appeals in 2007.

=== Tenure ===
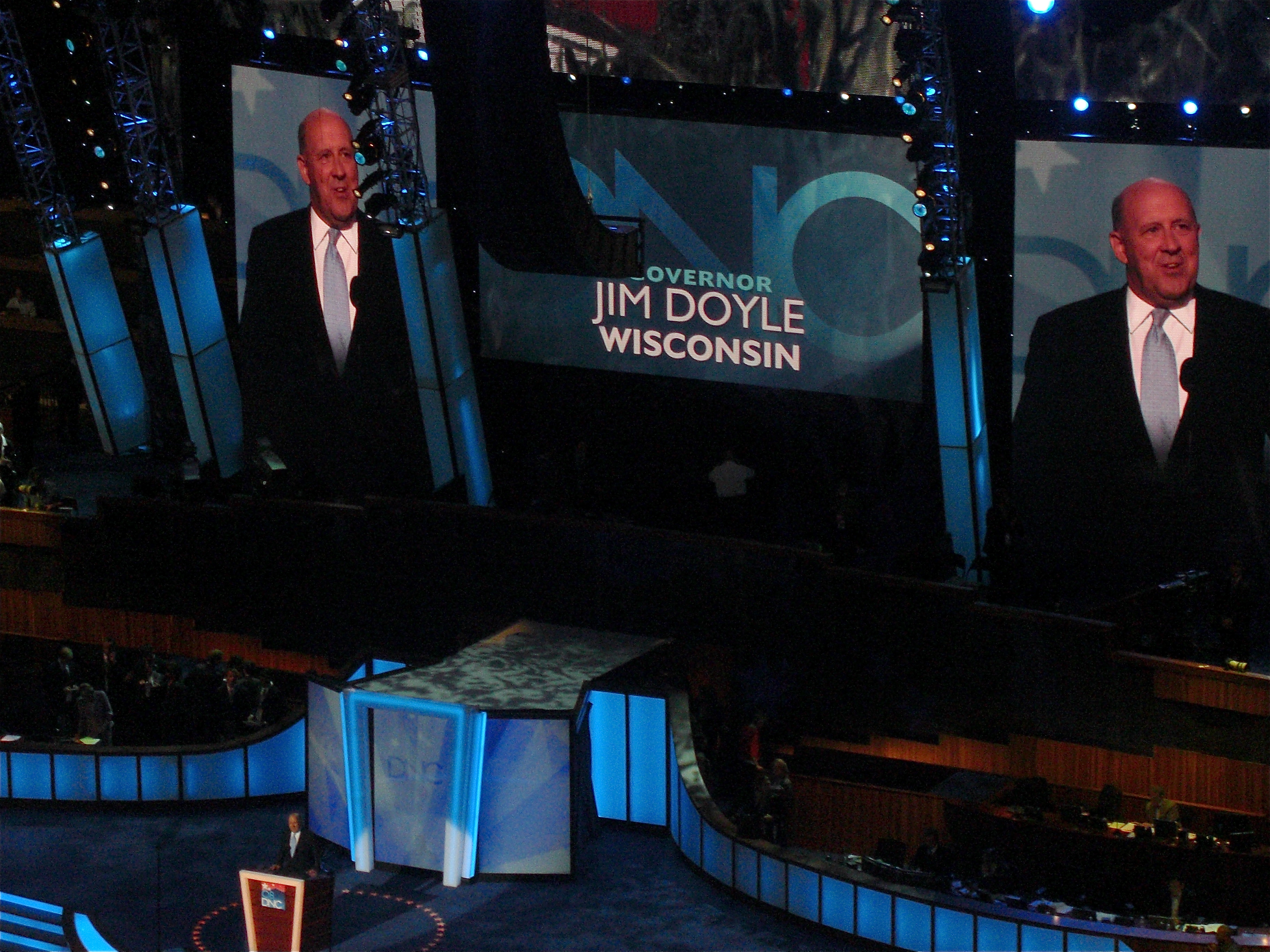
Doyle speaking at the 2008 Democratic National Convention

Doyle was sworn in on January 6, 2003, at the Wisconsin State Capitol in Madison. Upon taking office, Wisconsin faced a $3.2 billion deficit. The state ended the year 2003 with a deficit of $2.15 billion. Proposals for new programs were constrained by continued budget-cutting and his decision to honor a campaign pledge to not raise taxes. Facing political pressure, he signed a property tax freeze that has resulted in an anticipated decrease in average statewide property taxes in 2003. Doyle's stated priorities were investing in public schools, including the University of Wisconsin System, lowering property taxes, regional economic development, transportation reform, and funding of stem cell research.

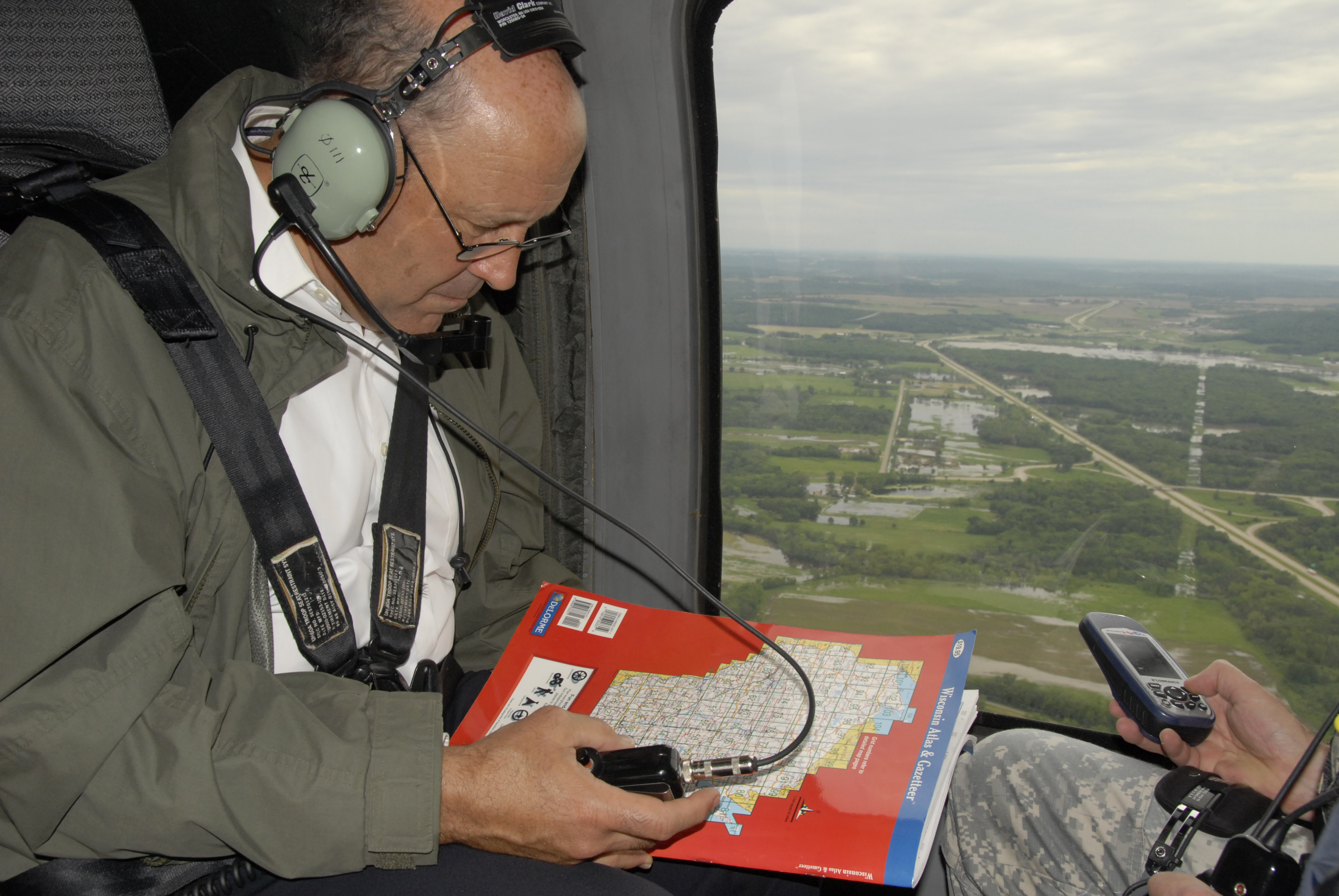
Doyle on board a UH-60 Blackhawk viewing 2008 flood damage

Doyle served as chair of the Midwestern Governors Association in 2007. In October 2007, the Republican-led Wisconsin State Assembly, Democratic-controlled Wisconsin State Senate, and Doyle passed a balanced budget that approved transferring $200 million from a medical malpractice fund to the Medical assistance trust fund. In July 2010, the Wisconsin Supreme Court ruled that the transfer was illegal and that the state must restore the money to the malpractice fund.

On January 2, 2009, Doyle joined the governors of four states in urging the federal government to provide $1 trillion in aid to the country's 50 state governments to help pay for education, welfare and infrastructure as states struggled with steep budget deficits amid a deepening recession.

On May 19, 2009, Doyle proposed a 75-cent-per-pack increase in the cigarette tax, an "assessment" against oil companies to help pay for road improvements, imposition of sales tax on music downloads and cell phone ringtones, and a 1 percent hike in the state income tax for individuals earning above $300,000 a year (approximately 1 percent of the state's population).

=== Retirement ===
Doyle raised about $500,000 for a campaign fund in the first half of 2007, leading political analysts to think he would have been financially ready to run for a third term as governor. In a speech to the state Democratic Party convention on July 6, 2007, he said, "And at the end of these four years of working together, who knows, maybe we'll need four more." He had changed his campaign website to JimDoyle2010.com, which had been seen a further indication of a re-election run. However, on August 17, 2009, Doyle announced that he would not seek a third term.

As of 2016, Doyle was an attorney 'of counsel' in the Madison office of the law firm Foley & Lardner and served on the corporate board of Epic Systems and Exact Sciences.

== Personal life ==
Jim Doyle is a fifth-generation state officeholder in Wisconsin. Doyle is married to Jessica Laird Doyle, niece of former Congressman Melvin Laird, and great-granddaughter of William D. Connor, who was lieutenant governor of Wisconsin from 1907–1909, and great-great-granddaughter of Wisconsin State Representative Robert Connor. They have two adopted sons, Gus and Gabe, a daughter-in-law, Carrie, a grandson, Asiah, and granddaughters Lily and Lucy.

== Electoral history ==
=== Wisconsin Attorney General (1990–1998) ===
Wisconsin Attorney General Election, 1990
Party	Candidate	Votes	%	±%
Democratic Primary, September 11, 1990
Democratic	Jim Doyle	106,050	56.29%	
Democratic	William Te Winkle	82,337	43.71%	
Total votes		188,387	100.0%	
General Election, November 6, 1990
Democratic	Jim Doyle	687,283	50.87%	+4.93%
Republican	Don Hanaway (incumbent)	635,835	47.06%	−4.89%
Labor–Farm	Patricia K. Hammel	27,948	2.07%	
Plurality		51,448	3.81%	-2.21%
Total votes		1,351,066	100.0%	-6.56%
Democratic gain from Republican				

Wisconsin Attorney General Election, 1994
Party	Candidate	Votes	%	±%
General Election, November 8, 1994
Democratic	Jim Doyle (incumbent)	805,334	52.52%	+1.65%
Republican	Jeff Wagner	709,927	46.30%	−0.76%
Libertarian	Steven S. Deibert	18,089	1.18%	
Plurality		1,533,350	100.0%	+13.49%
Total votes		1,533,350	100.0%	+13.49%
Democratic hold				

Wisconsin Attorney General Election, 1998
Party	Candidate	Votes	%	±%
General election, November 3, 1998
Democratic	Jim Doyle (incumbent)	1,111,773	64.90%	+12.38%
Republican	Linda Van de Water	565,073	32.99%	−13.31%
Constitution	James Chinavare	18,881	1.10%	
Libertarian	Ronald T. Emery	17,306	1.01%	−0.17%
Plurality		546,700	31.91%	+25.69%
Total votes		1,713,033	100.0%	+11.72%
Democratic hold				

=== Wisconsin Governor (2002, 2006) ===
Wisconsin Gubernatorial Election, 2002
Party	Candidate	Votes	%	±%
Democratic Primary, September 10, 2002
Democratic	Jim Doyle	212,066	26.39%	
Democratic	Tom Barrett	190,605	23.72%	
Democratic	Kathleen Falk	150,161	18.69%	
	Scattering	802	0.14%	
Total votes		553,634	100.0%	+152.90%
General Election, November 5, 2002
Democratic	Jim Doyle / Barbara Lawton	800,515	45.09%	+6.39%
Republican	Scott McCallum (incumbent) / M. A. Farrow (incumbent)	734,779	41.39%	−18.28%
Libertarian	Ed Thompson / M. Reynolds	185,455	10.45%	+9.82%
Green	Jim Young / Jeff Peterson	44,111	2.48%	+2.48%
Reform	Alan D. Eisenberg	2,847	0.16%	
Independent	Ty A. Bollerud	2,637	0.15%	
Independent	Mike Managan	1,710	0.10%	
Independent	Aneb Jah Rasta	929	0.05%	
	Scattering	2,366	0.13%	
Plurality		65,736	3.71%	-17.27%
Turnout		1,775,349	45.43%	+1.10%
Democratic gain from Republican				

Wisconsin Gubernatorial Election, 2006
Party	Candidate	Votes	%	±%
General Election, November 7, 2006
Democratic	Jim Doyle (incumbent) / Barbara Lawton (incumbent)	1,139,115	52.70%	+7.39%
Republican	Mark Green / Jean Hundertmark	979,427	45.31%	+3.92%
Green	Nelson Eisman / Leon Todd	40,709	1.88%	−0.60%
	Scattering	2,449	0.11%	
Plurality		159,688	3.71%	+3.68%
Turnout		2,161,700	53.19%	+7.76%
Democratic hold				

== Sources ==
- Laird, Helen L., 'A Mind of Her Own Helen Connor Laird and Her Family 1888–1982' The University of Wisconsin Press, 2006.

Party political offices
Preceded by Bronson La Follette	Democratic nominee for Attorney General of Wisconsin; 1990, 1994, 1998	Succeeded by Peg Lautenschlager
Preceded by Ed Garvey	Democratic nominee for Governor of Wisconsin; 2002, 2006	Succeeded by Tom Barrett
Legal offices
Preceded by Don Hanaway	Attorney General of Wisconsin; 1991–2003	Succeeded by Peg Lautenschlager
Political offices
Preceded by Scott McCallum	Governor of Wisconsin; 2003–2011	Succeeded by Scott Walker
U.S. order of precedence (ceremonial)
Preceded by Scott McCallum as Former Governor	Order of precedence of the United States	Succeeded by Scott Walker as Former Governor
