= St. Andrew's Church (LeRoy, Wisconsin) =

Church in LeRoy, Wisconsin, USA

- U.S. National Register of Historic Places
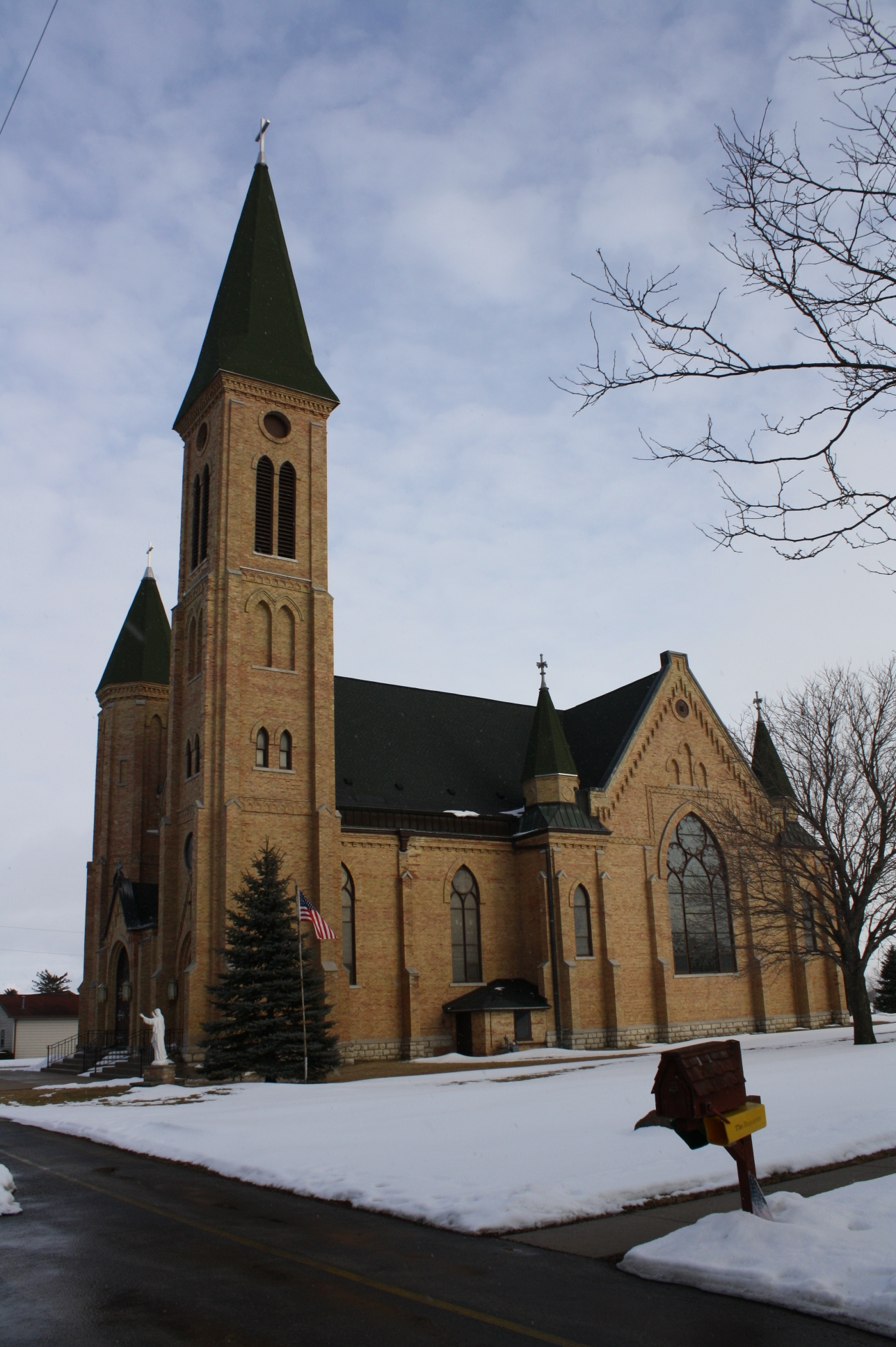

- Location within Wisconsin Location within the United States
- Location: W3081 Co. Hwy Y, LeRoy, Wisconsin
- Coordinates: 43°34′30″N 88°33′0″W
- Area: less than one acre
- Built: 1901
- Architect: Dohmen, Anton
- Architectural style: Gothic Revival
- NRHP reference No.: 09001295
- Added to NRHP: January 27, 2010

St. Andrew's Church is a historic Roman Catholic church in LeRoy, Wisconsin, United States. The Gothic Revival church was designed by architect Anton Dohmen and built 1899–1901, largely by parishioners. The Emil Frei Stained Glass Company later added over 20 stained glass windows to the church; these windows were described as "works of art with vivid colors and intricate details" by the Wisconsin Historical Society. The church's congregation was composed of German farmers from the surrounding area, who paid for the church and constructed parts of its interior; the church has historically served as a focal point for community life. The church has been called the "Cathedral on the Marsh" due to its proximity to the Horicon Marsh. On January 27, 2010, the church was added to the National Register of Historic Places.
