= Lomira, Wisconsin =

- Village
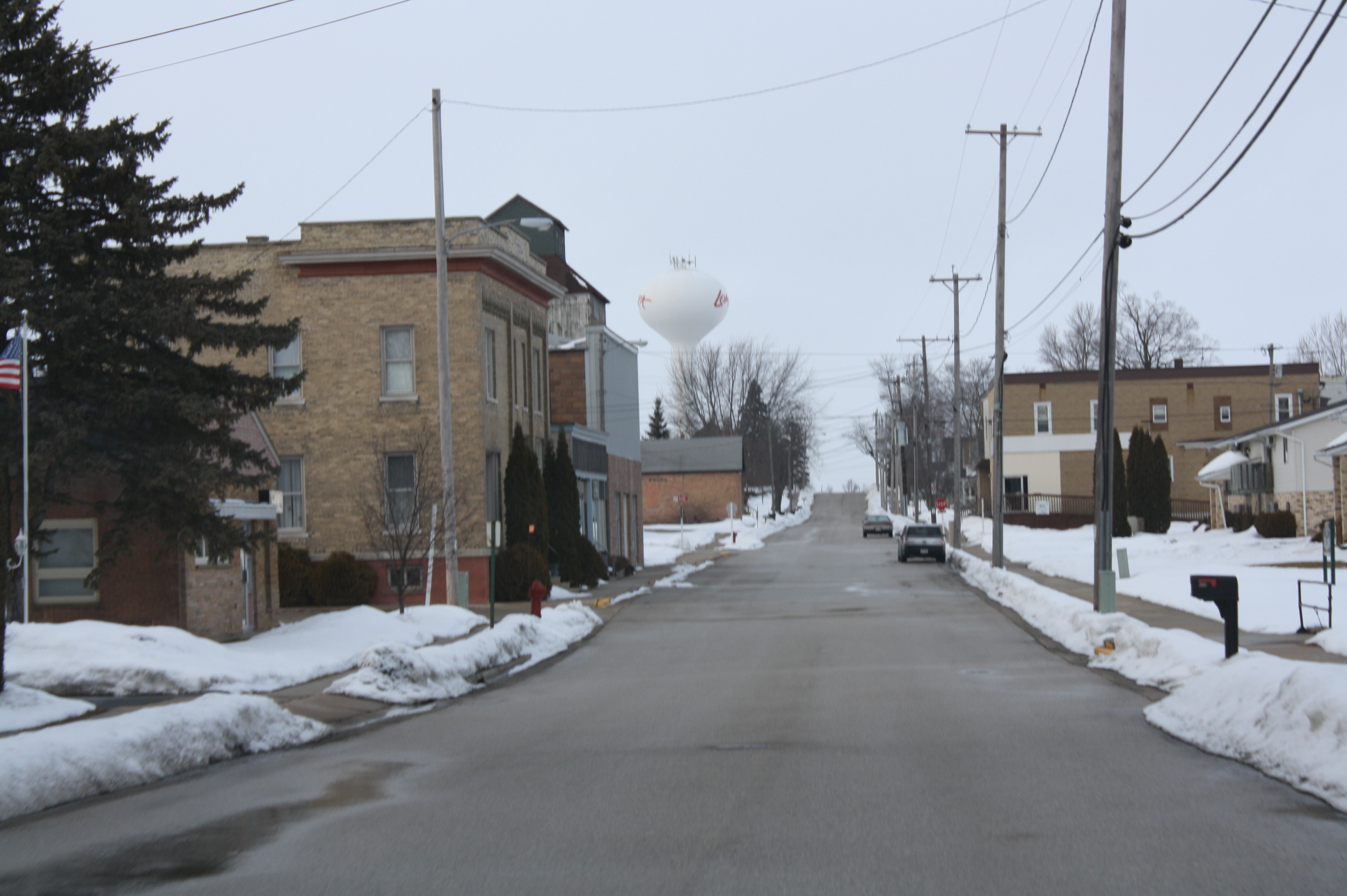
- Downtown Lomira

- Location of Lomira in Dodge County, Wisconsin.
- Coordinates: 43°34′39″N 88°26′50″W
- Country: United States
- State: Wisconsin
- County: Dodge

Area
  - Total: 2.15 sq mi (5.57 km^{2})
  - Land: 2.14 sq mi (5.54 km^{2})
  - Water: 0.015 sq mi (0.04 km^{2})
- Elevation: 1,053 ft (321 m)

Population (2020)
  - Total: 2,678
  - Density: 1,253/sq mi (483.8/km^{2})
- Time zone: UTC-6 (Central (CST))
  - Summer (DST): UTC-5 (CDT)
- Postal code: 53048
- Area code: 920
- FIPS code: 55-45500
- GNIS feature ID: 1568503
- Website: www.villageoflomira.gov

Lomira is a village in Dodge County, Wisconsin, United States. The population was 2,678 at the 2020 census. The village is located within the Town of Lomira, at the crossroads of State Highways 49, 67 and 175, U.S. Route 41 and Interstate 41.

== History ==
The early history of the Village of Lomira is closely interwoven with the Town of Lomira. Prior to the arrival of white settlers, the son of Chief Black Hawk supposedly camped in the vicinity while blazing a trail from Milwaukee to Green Bay. There is no record of a settlement at Lomira prior to 1849. It was originally called Springfield, but in 1849, the name was changed to Lomira. Local lore says the village is a namesake of Elmira Schoonover, daughter of Sam Schoonover, an early settler. The first Post Office was established on May 11, 1849.

A petition for incorporation of the village of Lomira was made to the circuit court of Dodge County on March 24, 1899. The petition described the designated territory of "433 residents" as "containing a large number of stores, saloons, residences, elevators, hotels, blacksmith shops, cheese factory, planing mill and other places of business, and that the same is a railroad station." Copies of the petition were posted in the saloons of F. Kauper and Peter Greiten, and in the store and office of Peter Wolf, "all of which said places are public places." Petitioners presented the incorporation order at a special term of the circuit court held in the city of Waukesha, Wisconsin on May 9, 1899. Records of the public election on June 3, 1899, show 104 ballots were cast, of which 58 were for incorporation and 45 against.

== Geography ==
Lomira is located at 43°35′42″N 88°26′40″W (43.595089, -88.444602).

According to the United States Census Bureau, the village has a total area of 2.15 square miles (5.57 km^{2}), of which 2.14 square miles (5.54 km^{2}) is land and 0.01 square miles (0.03 km^{2}) is water.

Lomira is commonly recognized by residents as being in the center of the triangle, with the three points of the triangle being Milwaukee, Green Bay, and Madison, each being roughly an hour long drive from Lomira.

== Demographics ==
Historical population
Census	Pop.	Note	%±
1900	492		—
1910	529		7.5%
1920	554		4.7%
1930	603		8.8%
1940	659		9.3%
1950	746		13.2%
1960	807		8.2%
1970	1,084		34.3%
1980	1,446		33.4%
1990	1,542		6.6%
2000	2,233		44.8%
2010	2,430		8.8%
2020	2,678		10.2%
U.S. Decennial Census

=== 2010 census ===
As of the 2010 census, there were 2,430 people, 1,002 households, and 639 families residing in the village. The population density was 1,203.0 inhabitants per square mile (464.5/km^{2}). There were 1,096 housing units at an average density of 542.6 units per square mile (209.5 units/km^{2}). The racial makeup of the village was 95.2% White, 0.7% African American, 0.5% Native American, 0.3% Asian, 1.7% from other races, and 1.6% from two or more races. Hispanic or Latino of any race were 4.6% of the population.

There were 1,002 households, of which 30.6% had children under the age of 18 living with them, 49.1% were married couples living together, 9.2% had a female householder with no husband present, 5.5% had a male householder with no wife present, and 36.2% were non-families. 29.6% of all households were made up of individuals, and 8.8% had someone living alone who was 65 years of age or older. The average household size was 2.39 and the average family size was 2.96.

The median age in the village was 36.7 years. 24.7% of residents were under the age of 18; 9.3% were between the ages of 18 and 24; 28.5% were from 25 to 44; 25% were from 45 to 64; and 12.4% were 65 years of age or older. The gender makeup of the village was 50.3% male and 49.7% female.

=== 2000 census ===
As of the 2000 census, there were 2,233 people, 846 households, and 583 families residing in the village. The population density was 1,148.8 people per square mile (443.6 people/km^{2}). There were 899 housing units at an average density of 462.5 units per square mile (178.6 units/km^{2}). The racial makeup of the village was 98.16% White, 0.36% Black or African American, 0.31% Native American, 0.13% Asian, 0.76% from other races, and 0.27% from two or more races. 2.55% of the population were Hispanic or Latino of any race.

There were 846 households, out of which 39.6% had children under the age of 18 living with them, 55.2% were married couples living together, 9.7% had a female householder with no husband present, and 31.0% were non-families. 25.4% of all households were made up of individuals, and 8.5% had someone living alone who was 65 years of age or older. The average household size was 2.58 and the average family size was 3.11.

In the village, the population was spread out, with 29.3% under the age of 18, 9.0% from 18 to 24, 32.6% from 25 to 44, 16.9% from 45 to 64, and 12.3% who were 65 years of age or older. The median age was 32 years. For every 100 females, there were 100.1 males. For every 100 females age 18 and over, there were 94.7 males.

The median income for a household in the village was $46,522, and the median income for a family was $52,600. Males had a median income of $36,440 versus $24,286 for females. The per capita income for the village was $20,256. About 3.1% of families and 3.9% of the population were below the poverty line, including 4.3% of those under age 18 and 6.7% of those age 65 or over.

== Transportation ==
Lomira is at the crossroads of State Highways 49, 67 and 175, and Interstate 41. The Canadian National Railroad provides industrials rail service for business and industry. Private air transportation is available in Fond du Lac, 10 miles (16 km) north of the village. Commercial air transportation is offered in Appleton, 50 miles (80 km) to the north; Milwaukee, 60 miles (97 km) to the south; and Oshkosh, 30 miles (48 km) to the north.

== Education ==
The 65-square-mile (170 km^{2}) School District of Lomira includes the villages of Lomira, Brownsville, and Theresa, the hamlet of Knowles, and all or portions of the towns of Ashford, Byron, and Eden in Fond du Lac County; Leroy, Lomira and Theresa in Dodge County; and Wayne in Washington County. The Lomira School District has two elementary schools, one in Lomira, a part of the single K-12th grade building, and the other in Theresa. The student population of the high school is 355. Lomira has one parochial school: St. John's Lutheran School (WELS). The Consolidated Catholic School Lomira-Theresa (CCLT) closed at the conclusion of the 2009–10 school year. In February 2013 district residents were surveyed about plans for the schools. The majority of respondents indicated a preference for significant upgrades to the district's schools, including a new gymnasium for the high school, relocation of the high school football field, new classrooms in the high school, and an additional cafeteria, kitchen, and district offices.

== Business and industry ==
Lomira is in an agricultural area, which is reflected in the nature of many of the businesses in the village. In 1985, printing became a significant presence with the opening of the Quad Graphics production plant, the largest single printing facility in the Western Hemisphere. In 2007 Kondex Corporation, a farm machinery and equipment manufacturer, opened a facility in a newly created industrial park. The small village also has 5 restaurants, 4 gas stations, 2 car dealerships, and several bars.

== Religion ==
Church name	Denomination	Street address	Founding date
Nativity of St. Mary Parish	Catholic (Roman Rite)	699 Milwaukee Street	1870
St. John's Lutheran Church & School	Lutheran (WELS)	558 Water Street	1863
Trinity United Methodist Church	United Methodist	300 Church Street	1851
Springfield Community Church	Non-Denominational	412 Pleasant Hill Avenue	2016

== Notable people ==
- Josh Bilicki, NASCAR driver

== Images ==
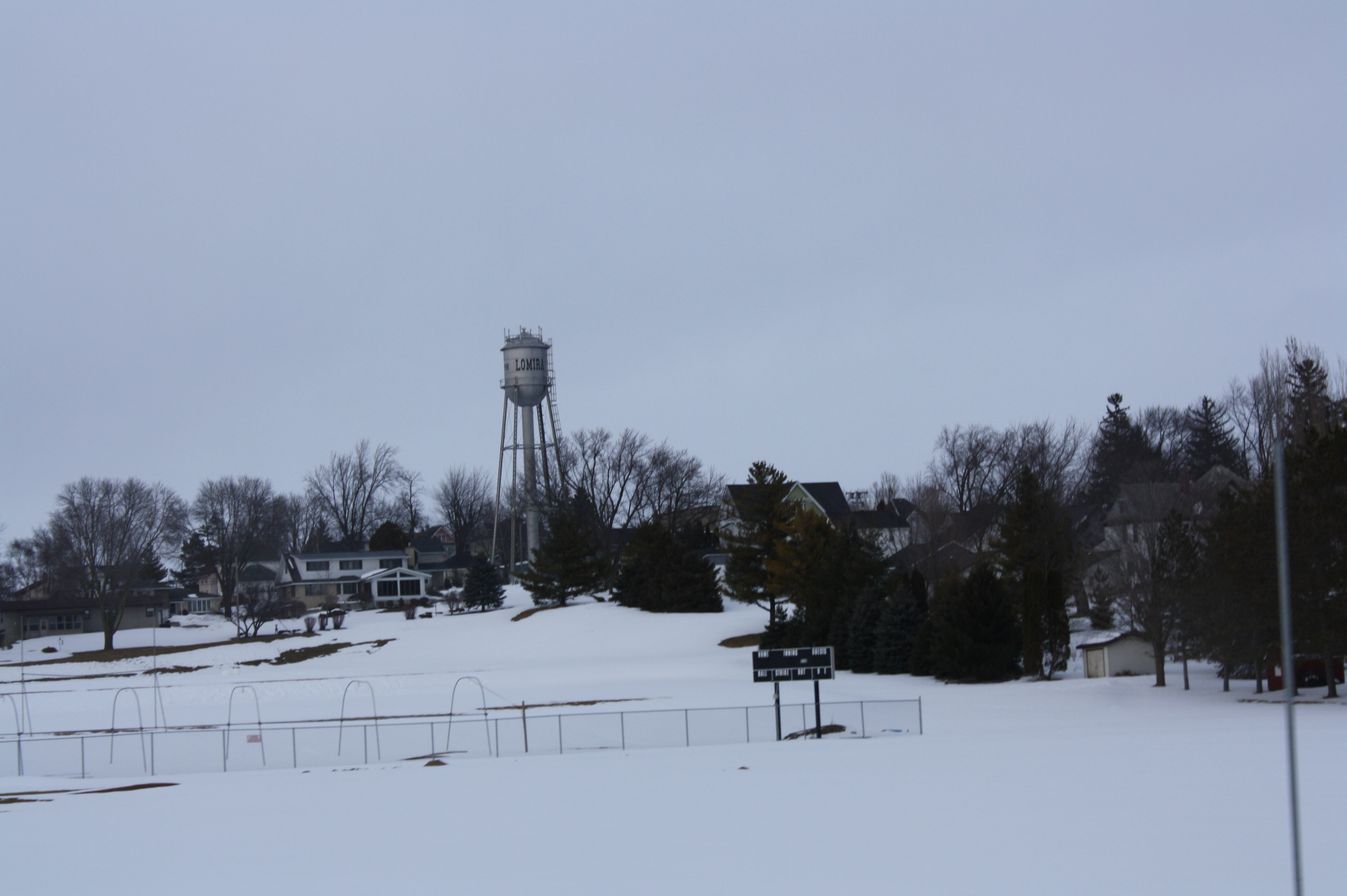
Looking north at Lomira's skyline

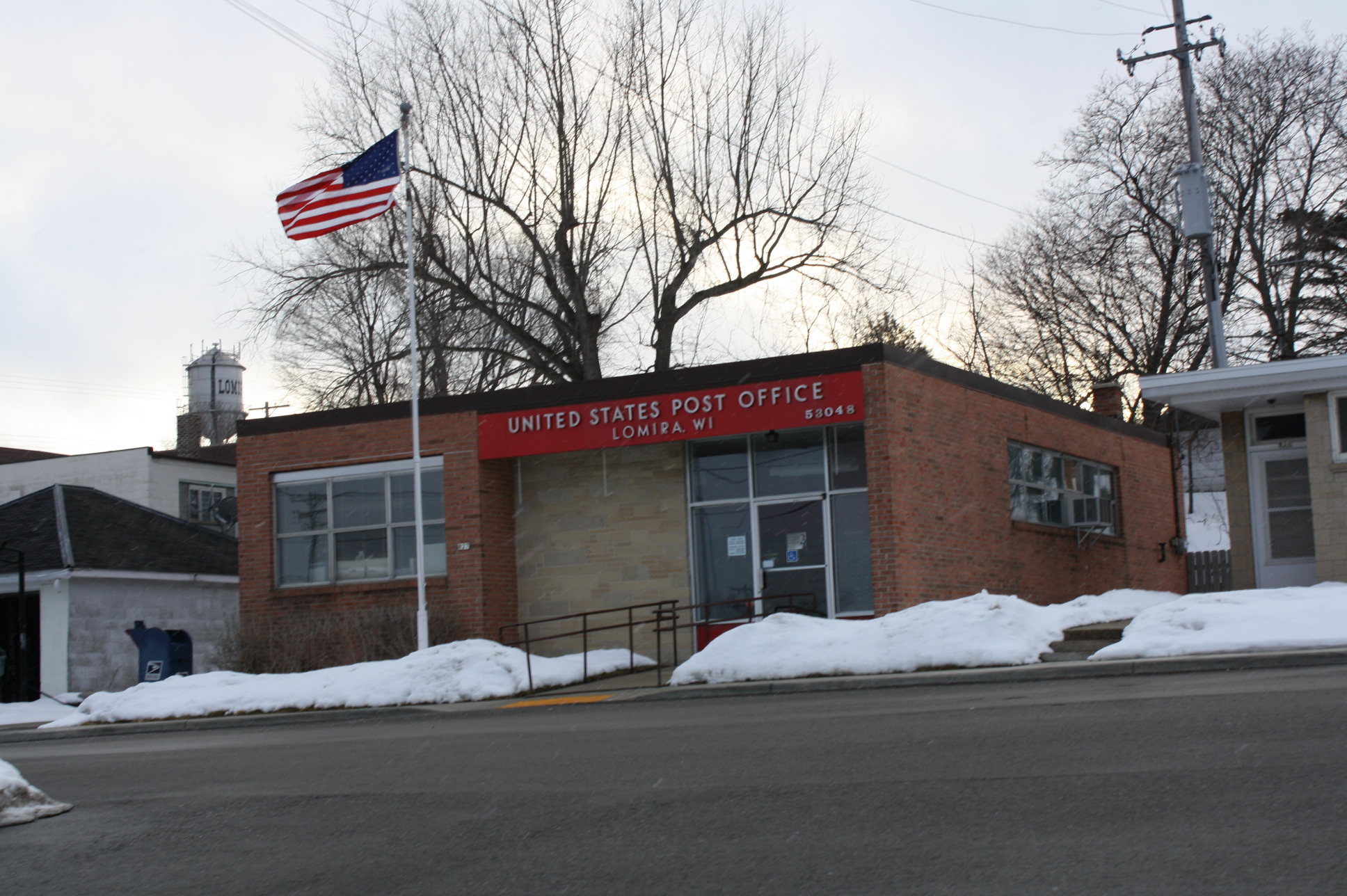
Post office

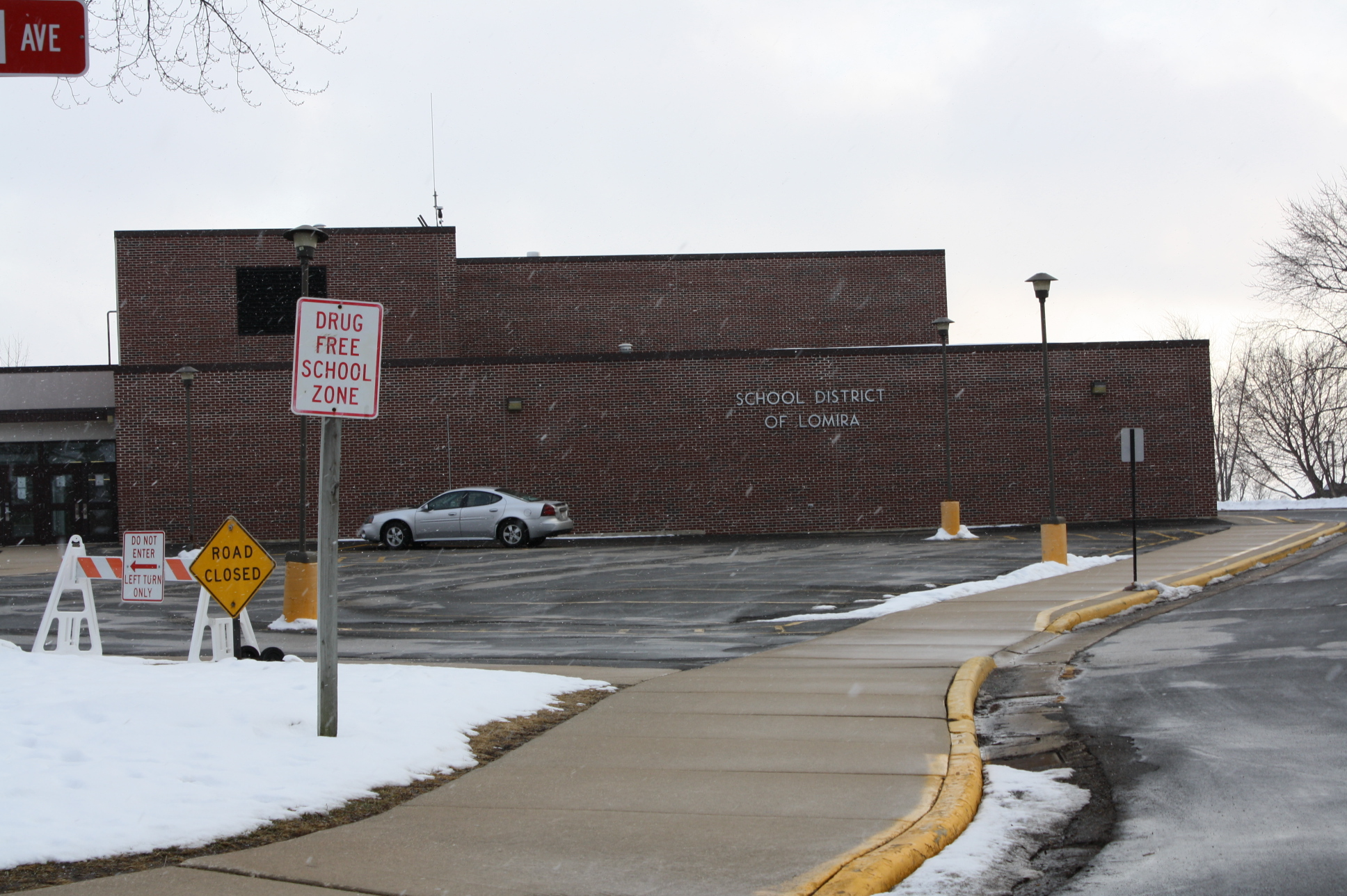
School

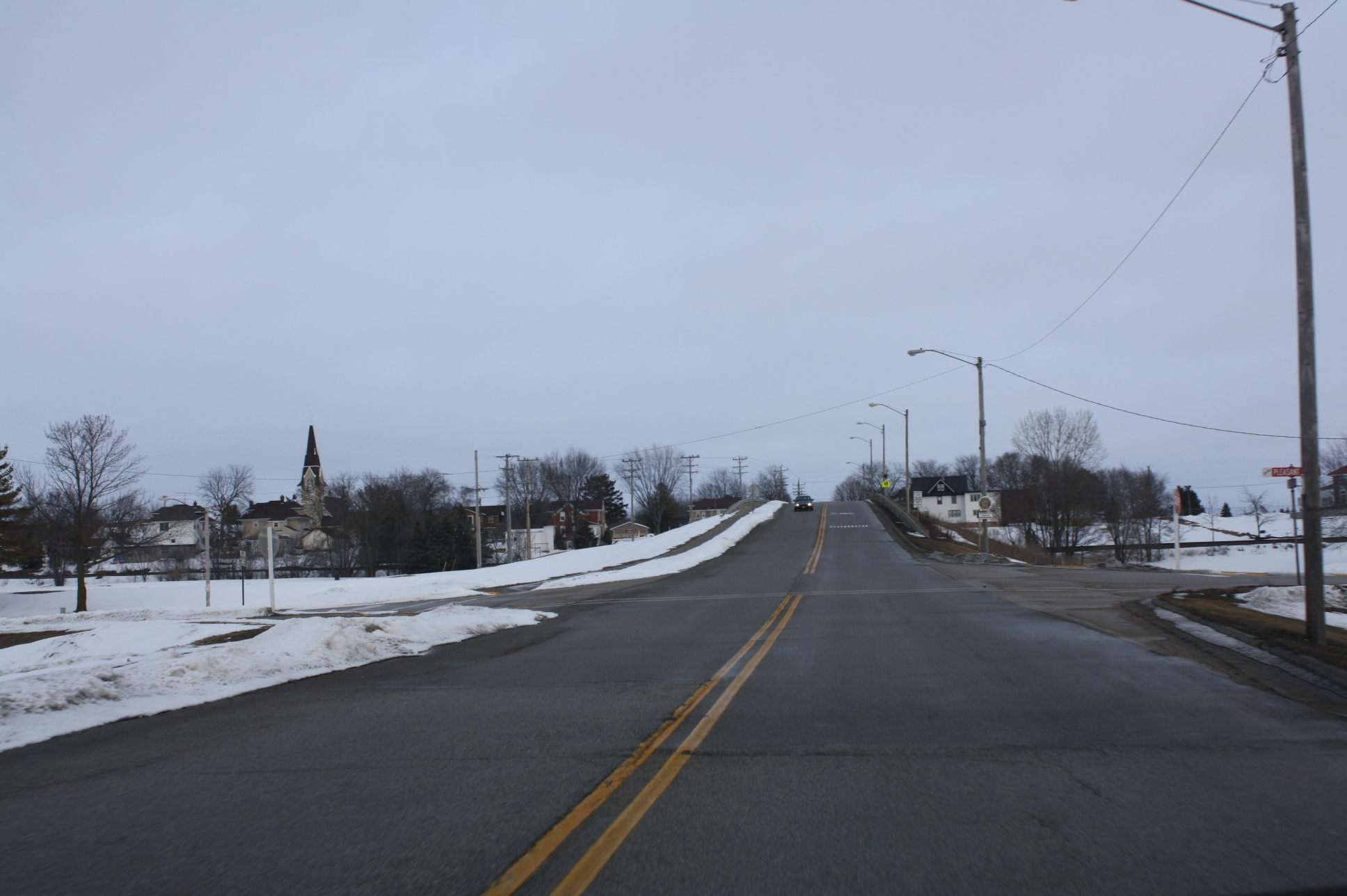
Looking east on Wisconsin Highway 67

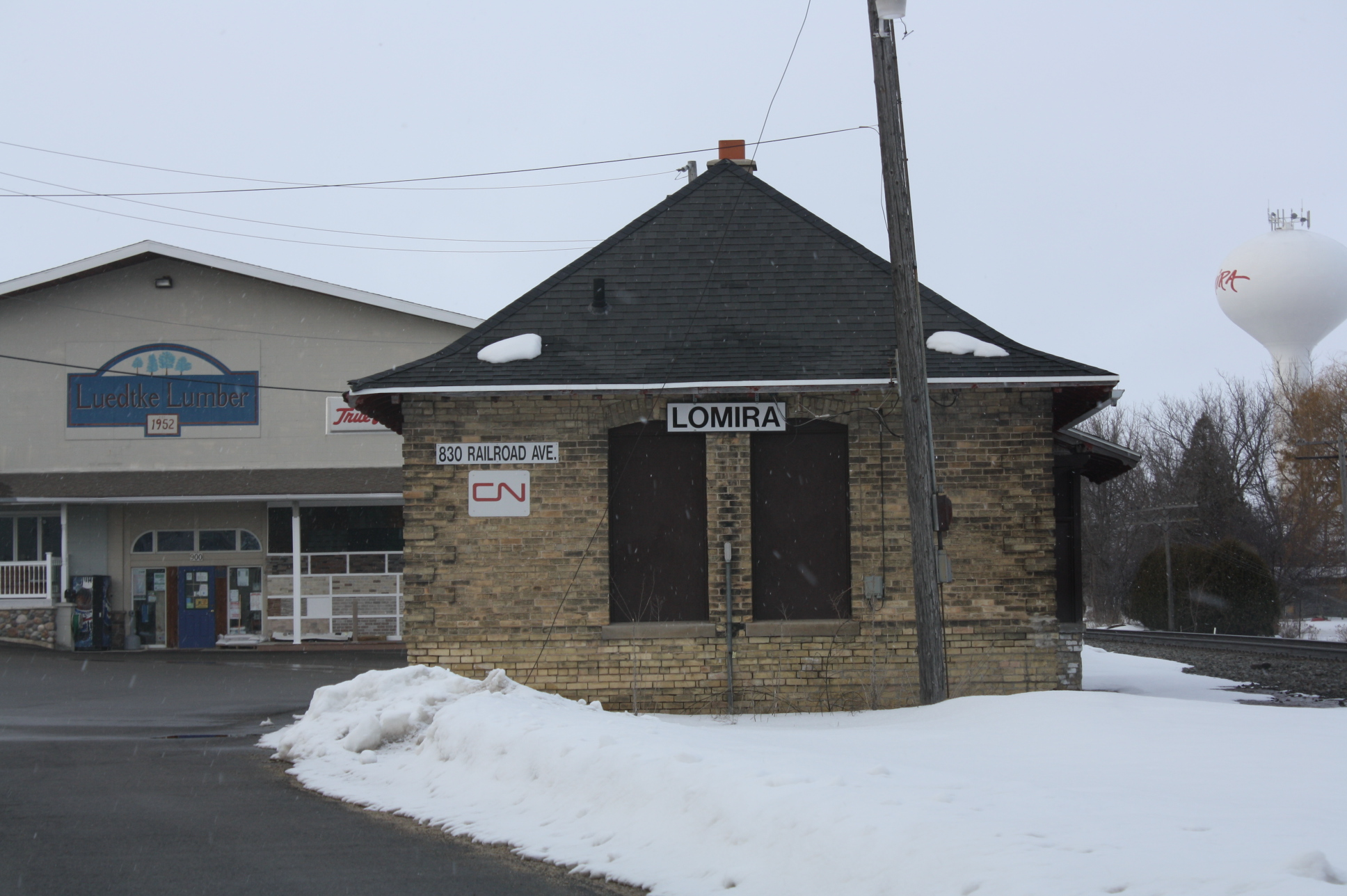
Train depot

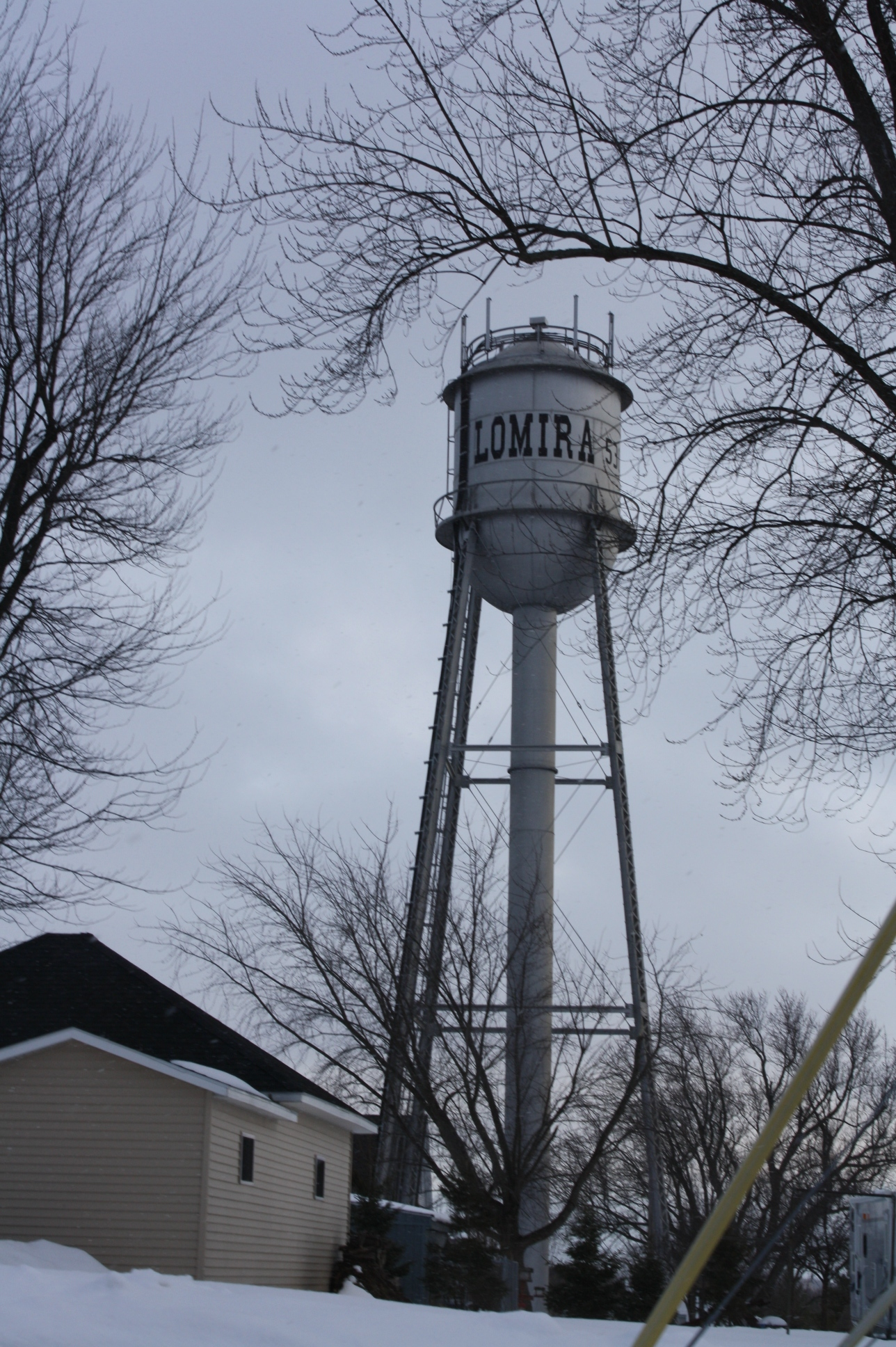
Water tower

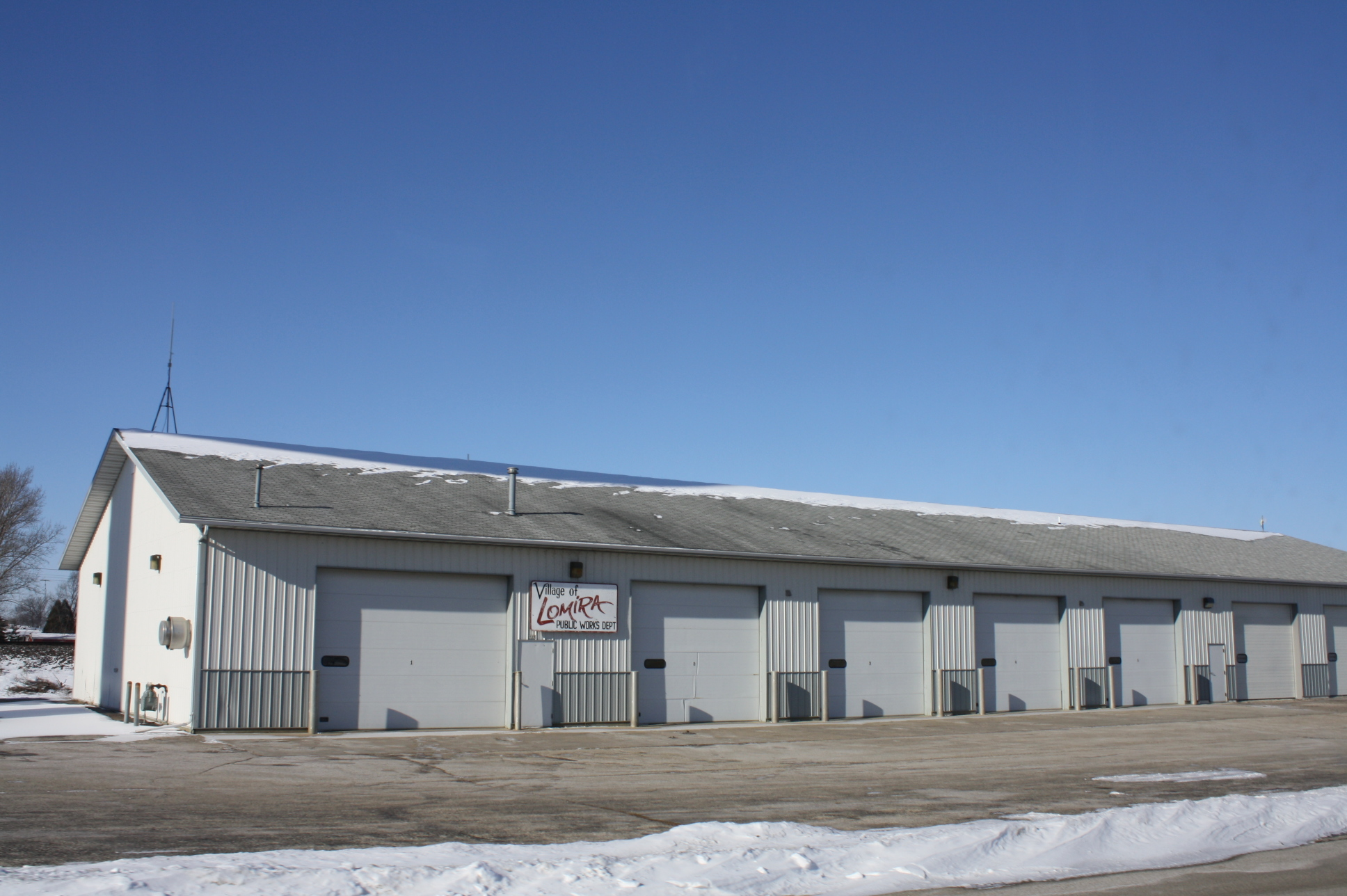
Public Works

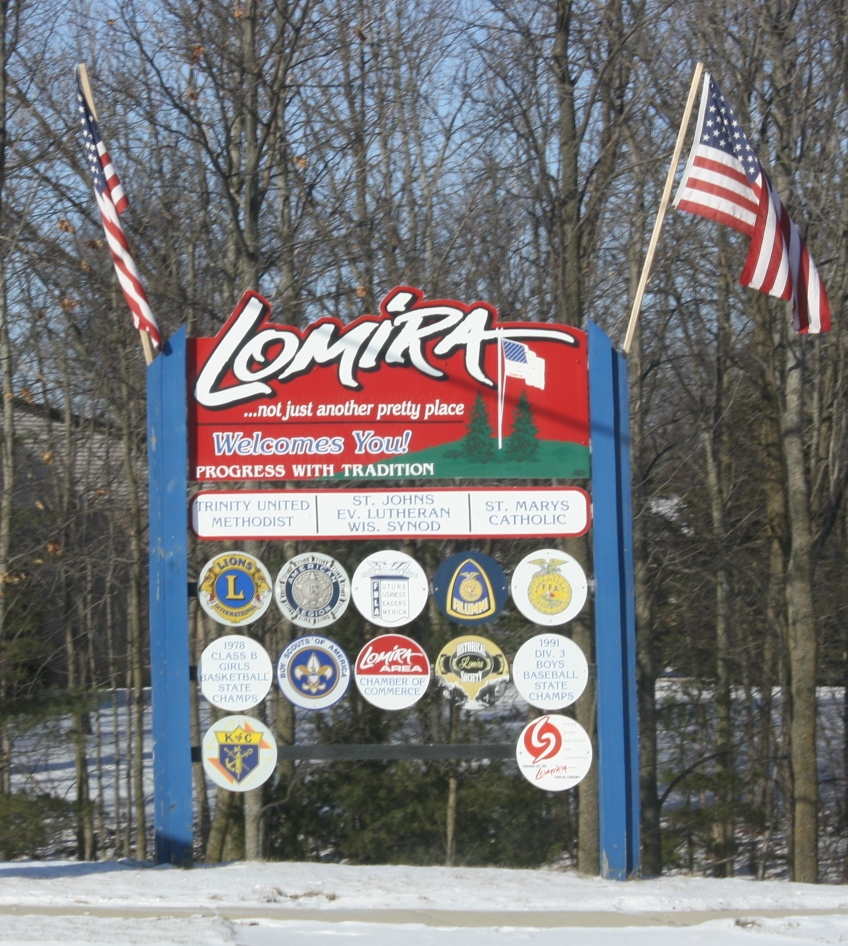
City welcome sign

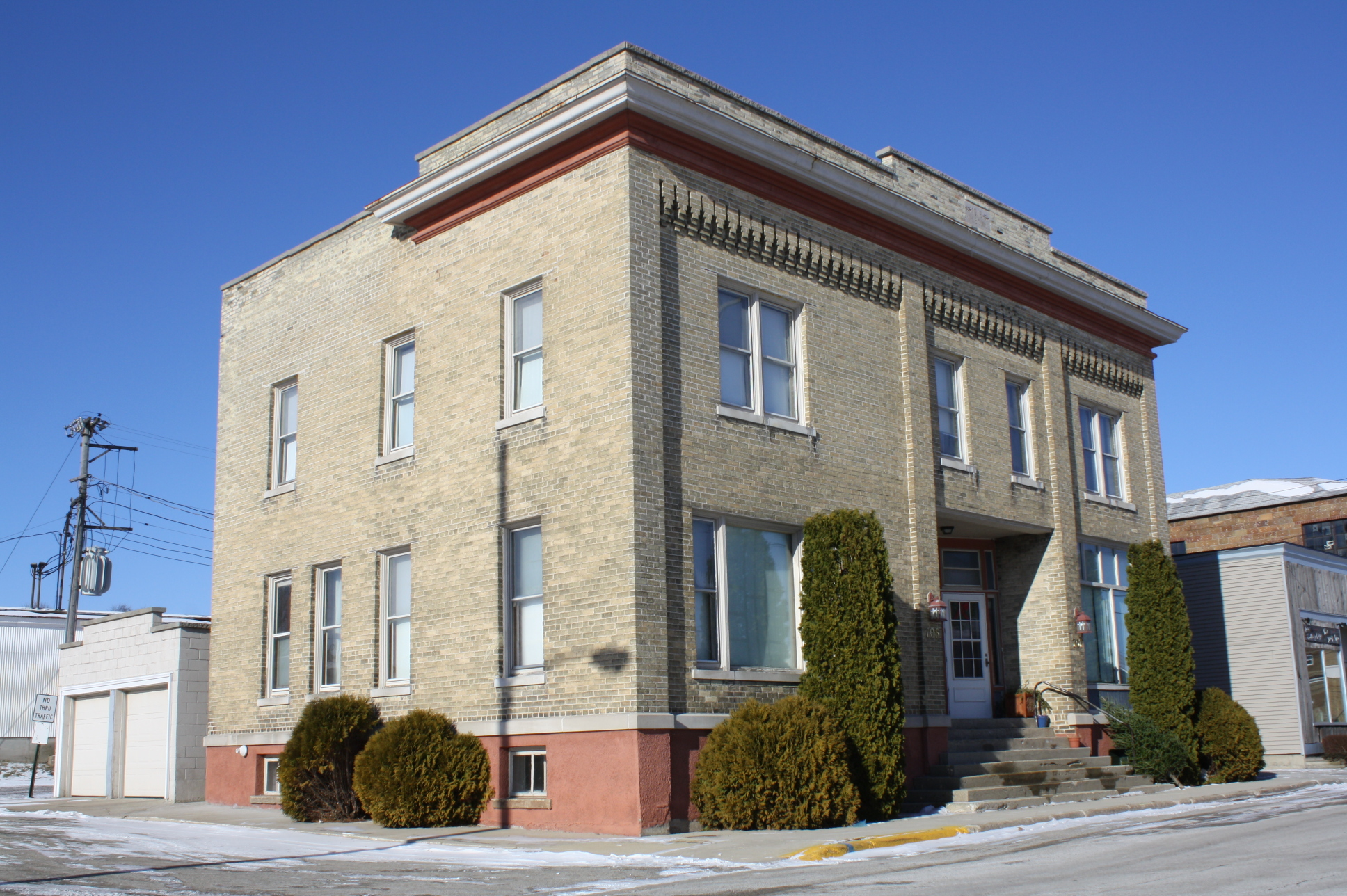
W. H. Boller Meat Market and Residence
