= LeRoy (community), Wisconsin =

LeRoy, Wisconsin
- Unincorporated community
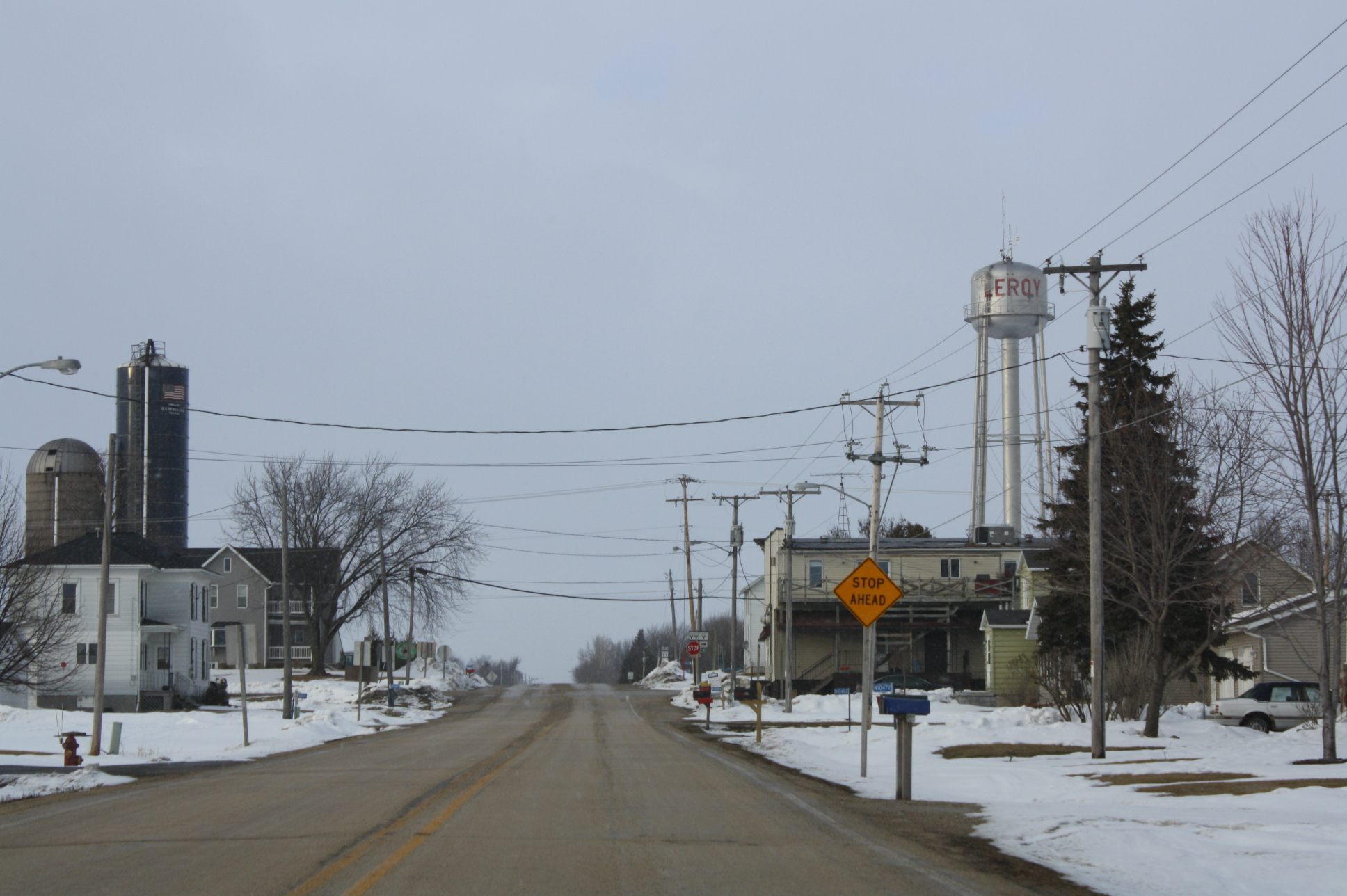
- Looking north at LeRoy

- Location within the state of Wisconsin
- Coordinates: 43°34′24″N 88°33′38″W
- Country: United States
- State: Wisconsin
- County: Dodge
- Town: LeRoy
- Elevation: 1,050 ft (320 m)
- Time zone: UTC-6 (Central (CST))
  - Summer (DST): UTC-5 (CDT)
- ZIP codes: 53048
- Area code: 920

LeRoy is an unincorporated community in the town of LeRoy in Dodge County, Wisconsin, United States. It is located at the intersection of County Y and County YY several miles west of Knowles.

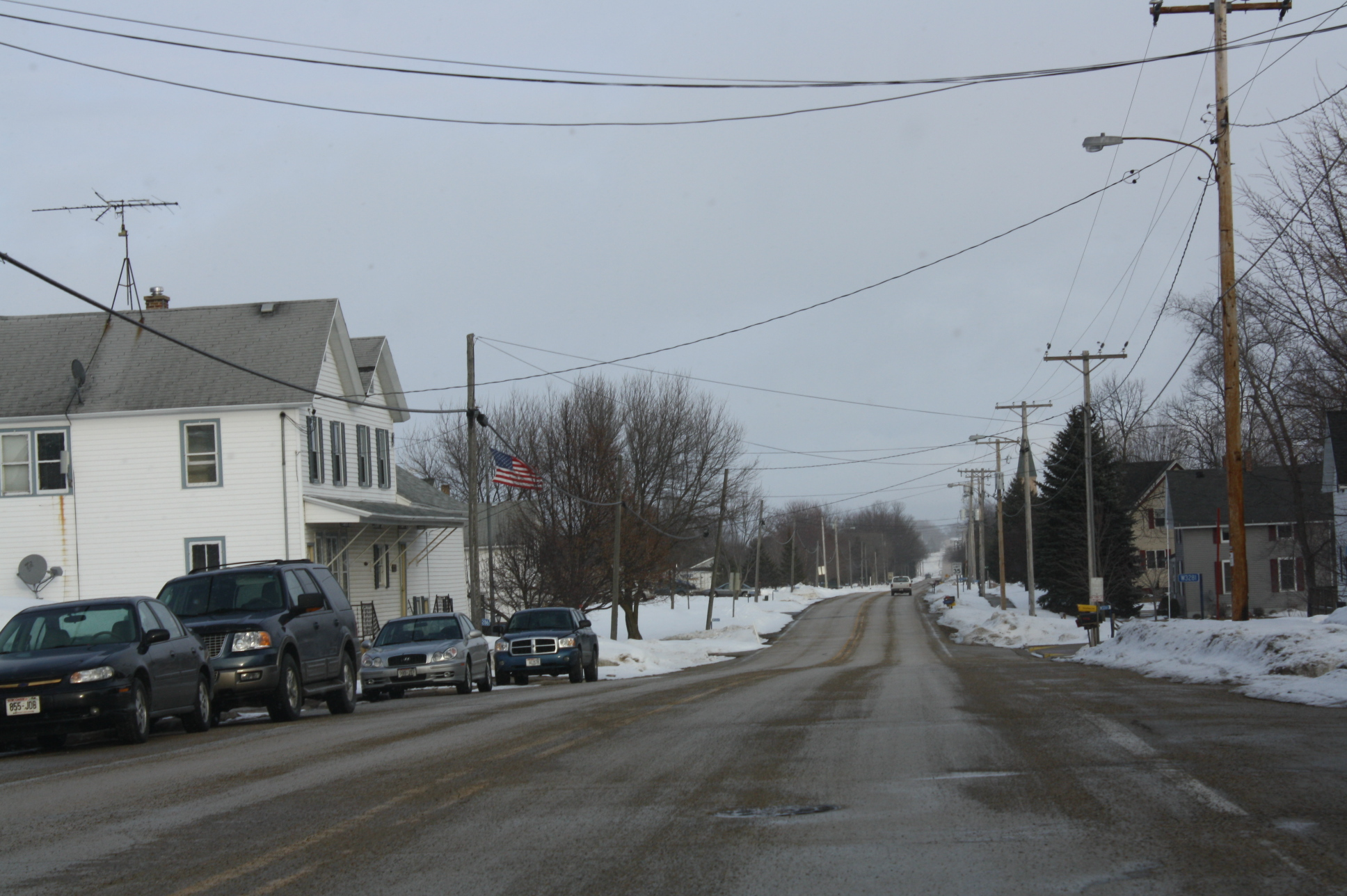
Looking east at downtown LeRoy

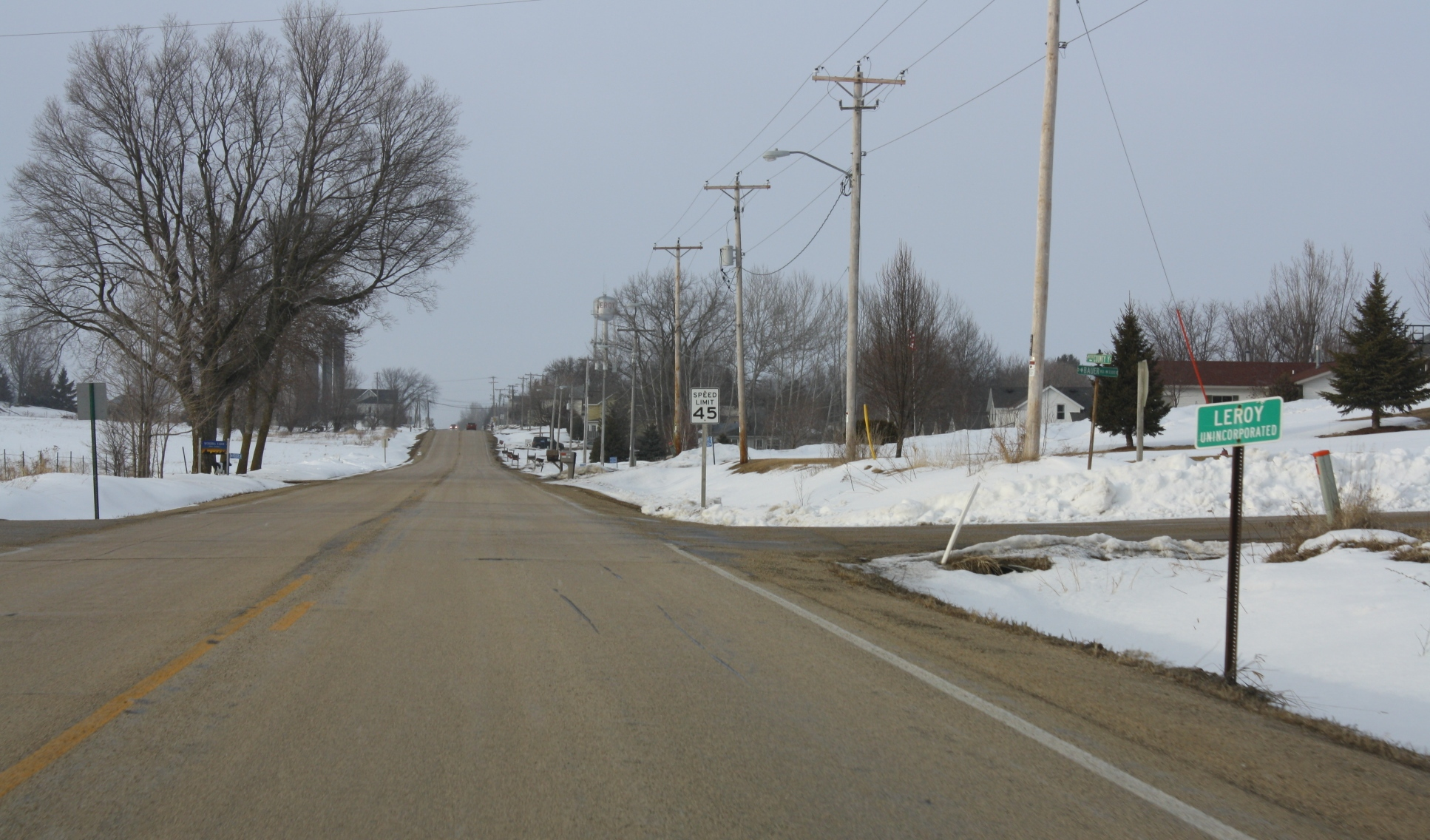
Looking north at LeRoy's welcome sign

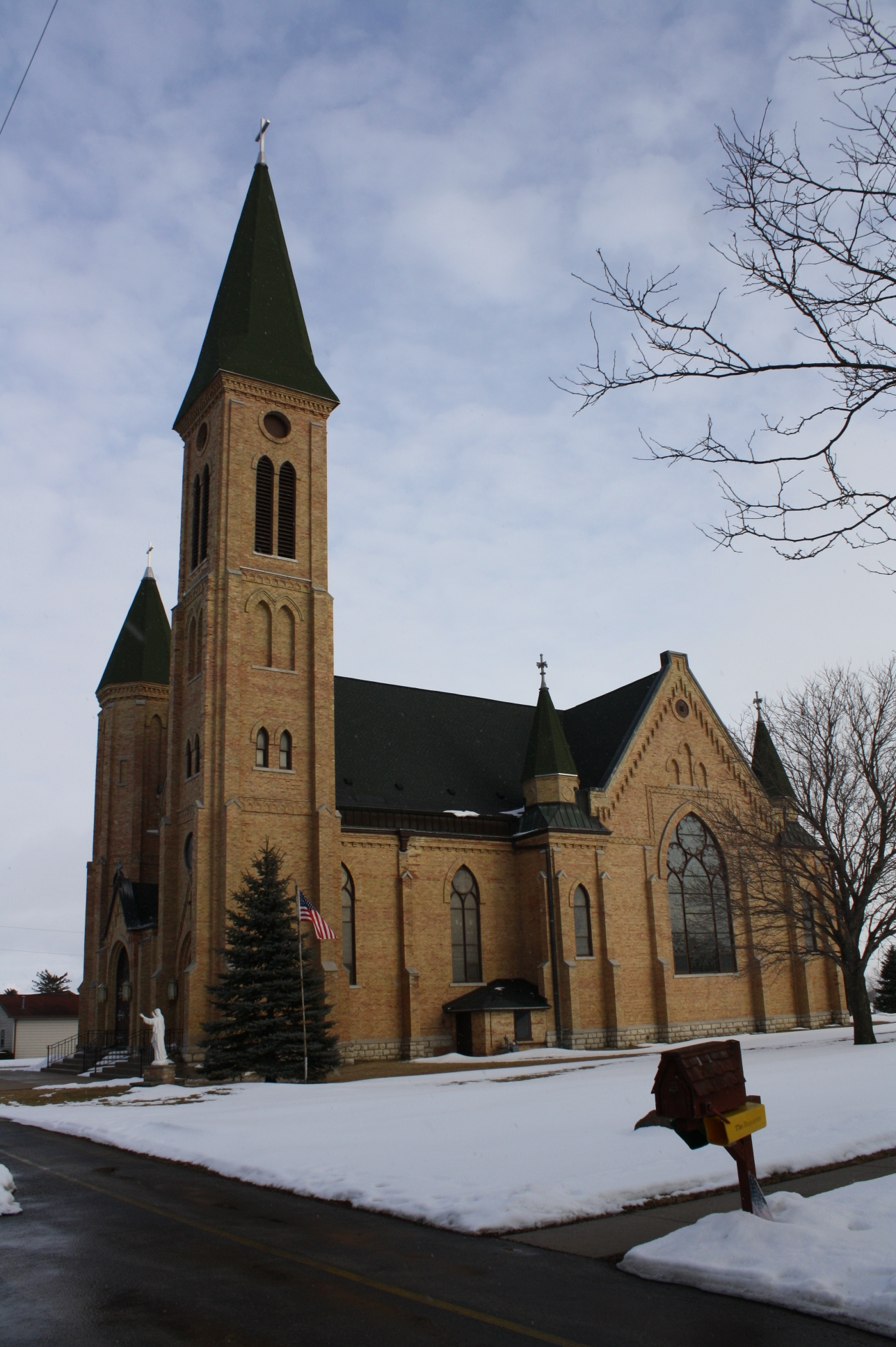
St. Andrew's Church, listed on the National Register of Historic Places
