= Joseph Weix =

American politician

Joseph Weix (February 13, 1874 – March 30, 1925) was an American businessman and politician.

Born in Leroy, Wisconsin, Weix owned a store and was in the lumber business. He served on the Colby, Wisconsin village board and on the Marathon County, Wisconsin Board of Supervisors. In 1921, Weix served in the Wisconsin State Assembly and was a Republican.
