= W. H. Boller Meat Market and Residence =

- U.S. National Register of Historic Places
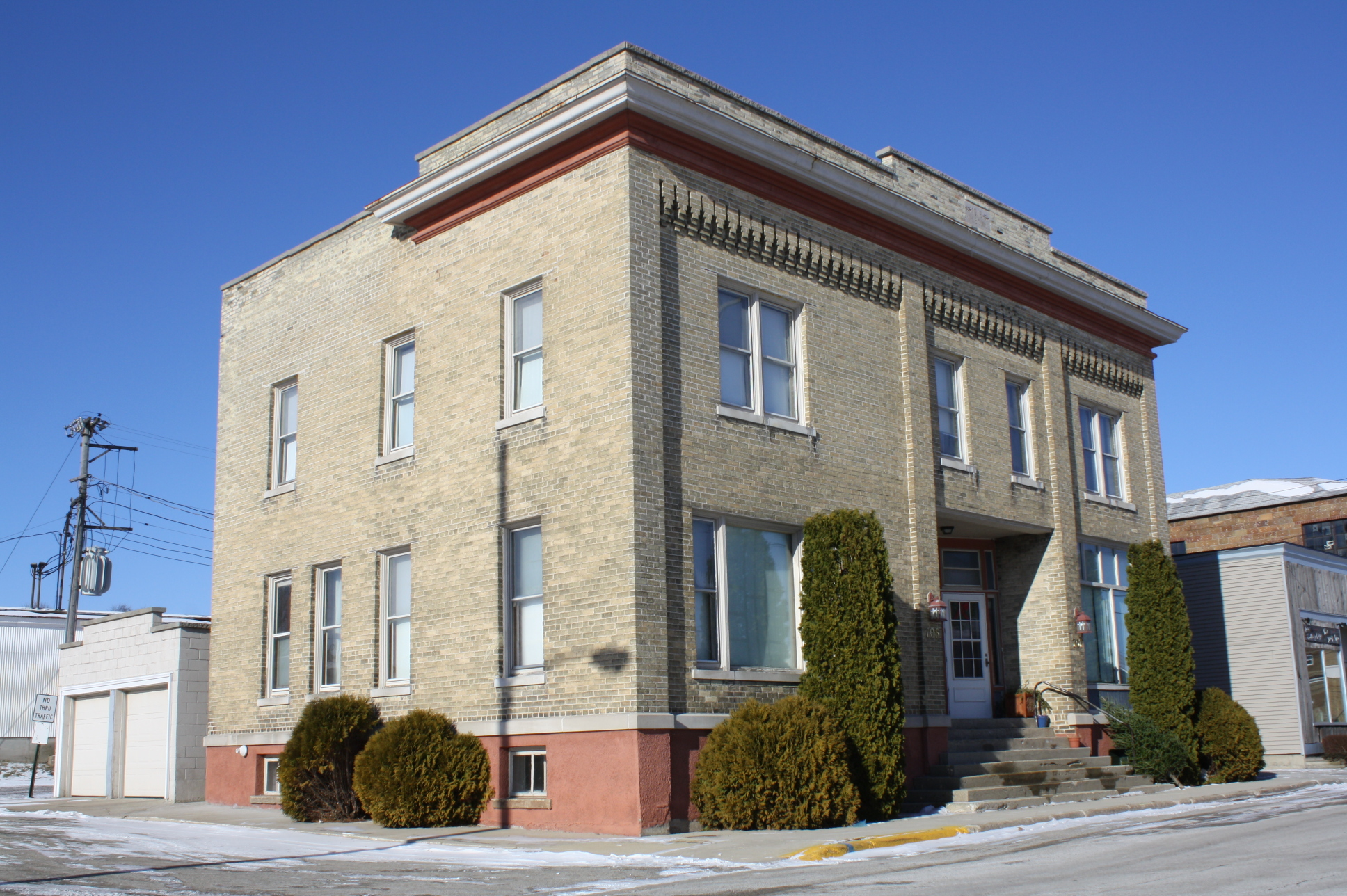
- Location: 705 S. Water St., Lomira, Wisconsin
- Coordinates: 43°35′29″N 88°26′25″W
- Area: less than one acre
- Built: 1913
- Architectural style: Late 19th and 20th Century Revivals/Vernacular
- NRHP reference No.: 94000997
- Added to NRHP: August 19, 1994

The W. H. Boller Meat Market and Residence is located in Lomira, Wisconsin.

== Description ==
The site is a 2-story cream brick building, originally containing a meat market, cold store, and living quarters, built in 1913 for William Boller. It was added to the State Register of Historic Places in 1992 and to the National Register of Historic Places in 1994.
