= Lomira (town), Wisconsin =

Town of Wisconsin

Lomira, Wisconsin
- Town
- Town of Lomira
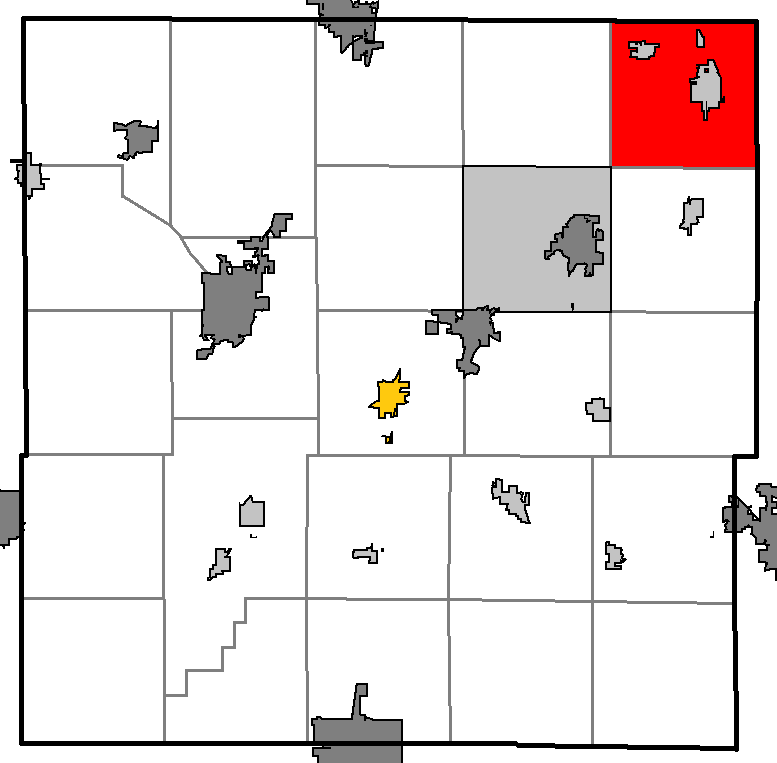
- Location of Lomira, within Dodge County
- Coordinates: 43°34′26″N 88°27′26″W
- Country: United States
- State: Wisconsin
- County: Dodge

Area
  - Total: 33.87 sq mi (87.7 km^{2})
  - Land: 33.86 sq mi (87.7 km^{2})
  - Water: 0.01 sq mi (0.026 km^{2})

Population (2020)
  - Total: 1,099
  - Density: 32.46/sq mi (12.53/km^{2})
- Time zone: UTC-6 (Central (CST))
  - Summer (DST): UTC-5 (CDT)
- Area code(s): 920 & 274
- GNIS feature ID: 1583594

Lomira is a town in Dodge County, Wisconsin, United States. The population was 1,099 at the 2020 census. The Village of Lomira is located within the town. The unincorporated communities of Knowles and Nasbro are located in the town.

== Geography ==
According to the United States Census Bureau, the town has a total area of 34.4 square miles (89.0 km^{2}), all land.

== Demographics ==
At the 2000 census, there were 1,228 people, 423 households and 337 families residing in the town. The population density was 35.7 per square mile (13.8/km^{2}). There were 430 housing units at an average density of 12.5 per square mile (4.8/km^{2}). The racial makeup of the town was 98.53% White, 0.08% Black or African American, 0.24% Asian, 0.16% from other races, and 0.98% from two or more races. 0.33% of the population were Hispanic or Latino of any race.

There were 423 households, of which 39.5% had children under the age of 18 living with them, 72.1% were married couples living together, 3.8% had a female householder with no husband present, and 20.3% were non-families. 15.6% of all households were made up of individuals, and 5.9% had someone living alone who was 65 years of age or older. The average household size was 2.90 and the average family size was 3.28.

29.6% of the population were under the age of 18, 6.1% from 18 to 24, 30.7% from 25 to 44, 22.9% from 45 to 64, and 10.7% who were 65 years of age or older. The median age was 36 years. For every 100 females, there were 115.8 males. For every 100 females age 18 and over, there were 116.3 males.

The median household income was $51,071 and the median family income was $56,528. Males had a median income of $38,485 versus $24,712 for females. The per capita income for the town was $21,548. About 4.5% of families and 5.1% of the population were below the poverty line, including 5.4% of those under age 18 and 4.9% of those age 65 or over.
