= Farmersville, Wisconsin =

- Unincorporated community
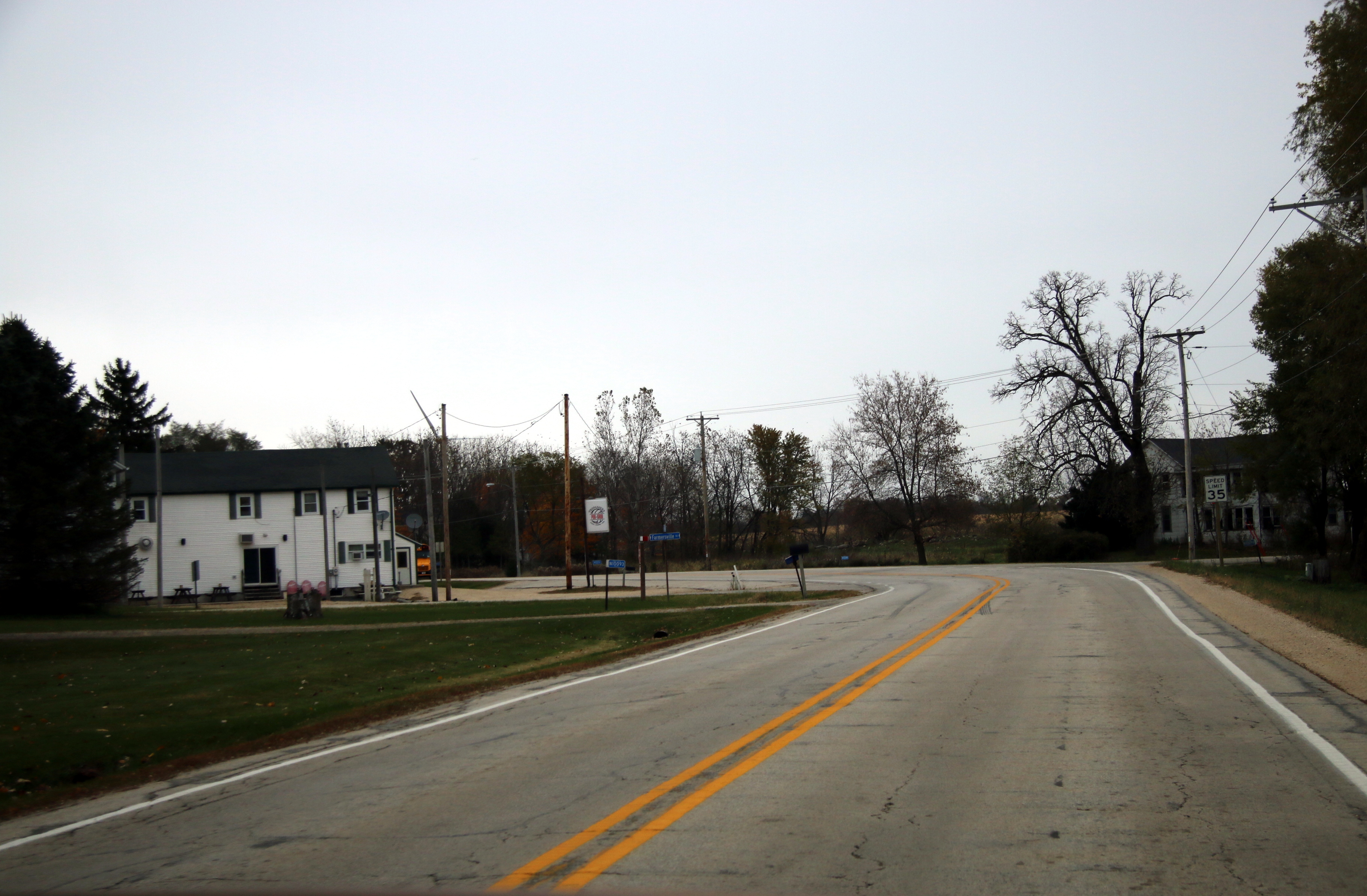
- Buildings in Farmsville

- Location within Wisconsin Location within the United States
- Coordinates: 43°33′30″N 88°31′53″W
- Country: United States
- State: Wisconsin
- County: Dodge County
- Town: LeRoy
- Elevation: 981 ft (299 m)
- Time zone: UTC-6 (Central (CST))
  - Summer (DST): UTC-5 (CDT)
- Area code: 920
- GNIS feature ID: 1564865

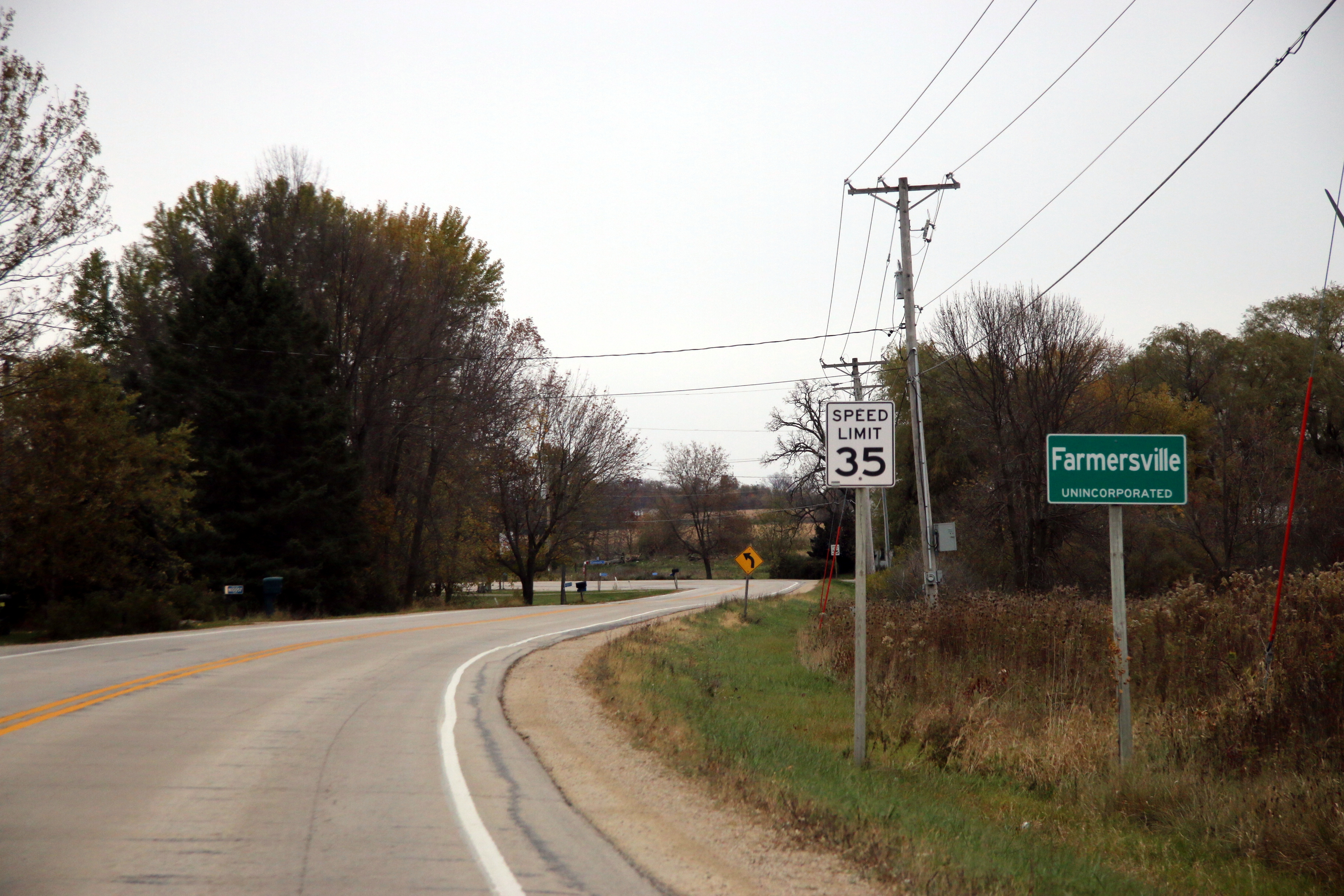
Sign for Farmersville

Farmersville is an unincorporated community located in the town of LeRoy, Dodge County, Wisconsin, United States.

== Notable people ==
- Frank E. Bachhuber, lawyer, businessman, politician
