= Ruth Bachhuber Doyle =

American politician (1916–2006)

Member of the Wisconsin State Assembly from the Dane 1st district
- In office January 3, 1949 – January 5, 1953
- Preceded by: Lyall T. Beggs
- Succeeded by: Floyd E. Wheeler

Personal details
- Born: Ruth Mabel Bachhuber; October 14, 1916 Milwaukee, Wisconsin, U.S.
- Died: May 6, 2006 (aged 89) Madison, Wisconsin, U.S.
- Resting place: Resurrection Cemetery, Madison
- Party: Democratic
- Spouse: James Edward Doyle (m. 1940; died 1987)
- Children: 4, including Jim Doyle
- Parent: Frank E. Bachhuber (father)
- Relatives: Andrew Bachhuber (grandfather); Max Bachhuber (great-grandfather)
- Education: University of Wisconsin–Madison (BA); Columbia University (MA)
- Occupation: Politician, educator

Ruth Bachhuber Doyle (born Ruth Mabel Bachhuber; October 14, 1916 – May 6, 2006) was an American educator and Democratic politician. She served two terms in the Wisconsin State Assembly, representing the city of Madison during the 1949 and 1951 sessions. She was the wife of federal judge James Edward Doyle and the mother of Jim Doyle, the 44th governor of Wisconsin.

Her father, Frank E. Bachhuber, grandfather, Andrew Bachhuber, and great-grandfather, Max Bachhuber, also served in the Wisconsin State Assembly.

== Early life ==
Ruth Bachhuber was born in Milwaukee, Wisconsin, on October 14, 1916, to Mabel (née Foley) and Frank E. Bachhuber. She went to elementary and high schools in Wausau, Wisconsin. Doyle received a Bachelor of Arts from the University of Wisconsin–Madison in 1938 and a Master of Arts from Columbia University in 1939.

== Career ==
Doyle was a teacher. She worked for the Office of Alien Property Custodian in Washington, D.C. Doyle was elected to the Wisconsin State Assembly, as a Democrat from Dane County, Wisconsin, serving from 1949 to 1953.

She was the first woman from Dane County to be elected to the Wisconsin State Assembly. She became the fourth generation of her family to serve in the Wisconsin State Assembly following her father, Frank E. Bachhuber, grandfather, Andrew Bachhuber, and great-grandfather, Max Bachhuber. Doyle ran for the office of Wisconsin State Treasurer and lost the election. She then served on the Dane County Board of Supervisors. Doyle also served on the Madison School Board and was president of the school board. She also served as an assistant to the Dean of the University of Wisconsin Law School.

== Personal life ==
Ruth Bachhuber was the second of three children born to Frank E. Bachhuber and Mabel (née Foley) Bachhuber. She was the fourth generation of her family to serve in the Wisconsin State Assembly. Her father, Frank Bachhuber, represented Marathon County in the 1933 session; her grandfather, Andrew Bachhuber, and great-grandfather, Max Bachhuber, represented Dodge County in the 19th century.

Ruth Bachhuber married James Edward Doyle in 1940. They met while attending the University of Wisconsin–Madison. James Doyle was a prominent Madison lawyer and a former Wisconsin Progressive who became an important Democratic Party organizer. He became chairman of the Democratic Party of Wisconsin in the 1950s, and was then appointed a United States federal judge in the 1960s. They had four children together, including Jim Doyle, who went on to become the 44th governor of Wisconsin.

Ruth Doyle had Parkinson's disease later in life. She died in Madison, Wisconsin, on May 6, 2006.

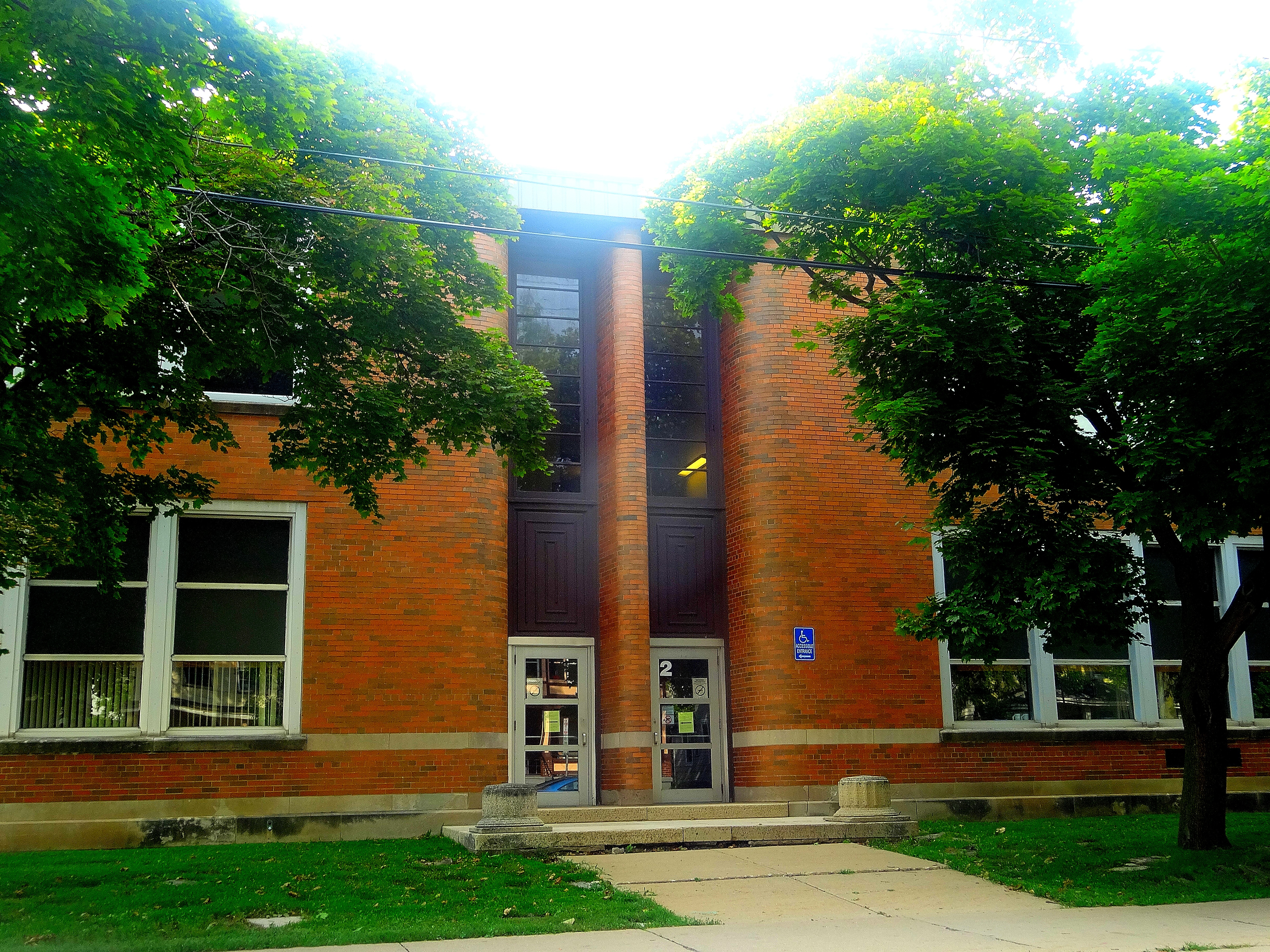
Ruth Bachhuber Doyle Administration Building

== Awards and legacy ==
- The James E. and Ruth B. Doyle Chair is an endowed professorship at the University of Wisconsin Law School named for Doyle and her husband.
- In 1990, the Madison School Board named the district's administration building after her.

Party political offices
Preceded by William S. Clark	Democratic nominee for Treasurer of Wisconsin; 1952	Succeeded by Oscar M. Jonas
Wisconsin State Assembly
Preceded by Lyall T. Beggs	Member of the Wisconsin State Assembly from the Dane 1st district January 3, 1949 – January 5, 1953	Succeeded by Floyd E. Wheeler
