= Charles E. Kite =

American politician (1929–1897)

Charles E. Kite (1829 – March 1, 1897) was a member of the Wisconsin State Assembly.

== Biography ==
Kite was born in Gloucestershire, England in 1829. He later owned a farm in Mayville, Wisconsin. In 1862, Kite married Clarissa Raymond. They had three children. He died on March 1, 1897.

== Assembly career ==
Kite was a member of the Assembly during the 1876 session. He was a Democrat.
