= Frank E. Bachhuber =

20th century American politician

Member of the Wisconsin State Assembly from the Marathon 2nd district
- In office January 2, 1933 – January 7, 1935
- Preceded by: Henry Ellenbecker
- Succeeded by: Rudolph Meisner

Personal details
- Born: Frank Edward Bachhuber; November 17, 1884 Farmersville, Wisconsin, U.S.
- Died: February 28, 1939 (aged 54) Wausau, Wisconsin. U.S.
- Resting place: Saint Marys Catholic Cemetery, Mayville, Wisconsin
- Party: Democratic
- Spouse: Mabel Margaret Foley (m. 1912–1939)
- Children: 4, including Ruth Bachhuber Doyle
- Parent: Andrew Bachhuber (father)
- Relatives: Max Bachhuber (grandfather); Jim Doyle (grandson)
- Education: Marquette University; American Institute of Banking
- Profession: Lawyer

Frank Edward Bachhuber (November 17, 1884 – February 28, 1939) was an American lawyer, businessman, and Democratic politician from Wausau, Wisconsin. He served one term in the Wisconsin State Assembly, representing the northeast quarter of Marathon County during the 1933 legislative term. His father, Andrew Bachhuber, and grandfather, Max Bachhuber, also served in the Assembly, as did his daughter, Ruth Bachhuber Doyle. He was also a grandfather of Jim Doyle, the 44th governor of Wisconsin.

== Early life ==
Frank E. Bachhuber was born on November 17, 1884, in Farmersville, Wisconsin, to Louise (nee Sterr) and Andrew Bachhuber. He graduated from Mayville High School in 1902. Bachhuber graduated from Marquette University in 1907 and the American Institute of Banking in 1912.

== Career ==
In 1922, he moved to Wausau, Wisconsin. He was an attorney for Marshall and Ilsley Bank in Milwaukee, Wisconsin. He practiced law in Wausau and was involved with the banking, loans, and mortgages businesses.

He was elected to the Wisconsin State Assembly in 1932 as a Democrat.

== Personal life ==
Bachhuber married Mabel Foley of Dodge County, Wisconsin, on July 3, 1912. Together, they had four children, including Ruth Bachhuber Doyle, who also served in the Wisconsin Assembly.

== Death ==
Bachhuber died on February 28, 1939, in Wausau. He is buried in Mayville.

Wisconsin State Assembly
Preceded by Henry Ellenbecker	Member of the Wisconsin State Assembly from the Marathon 2nd district January 2, 1933 – January 7, 1935	Succeeded by Rudolph Meisner
