= Knowles, Wisconsin =

- Unincorporated community
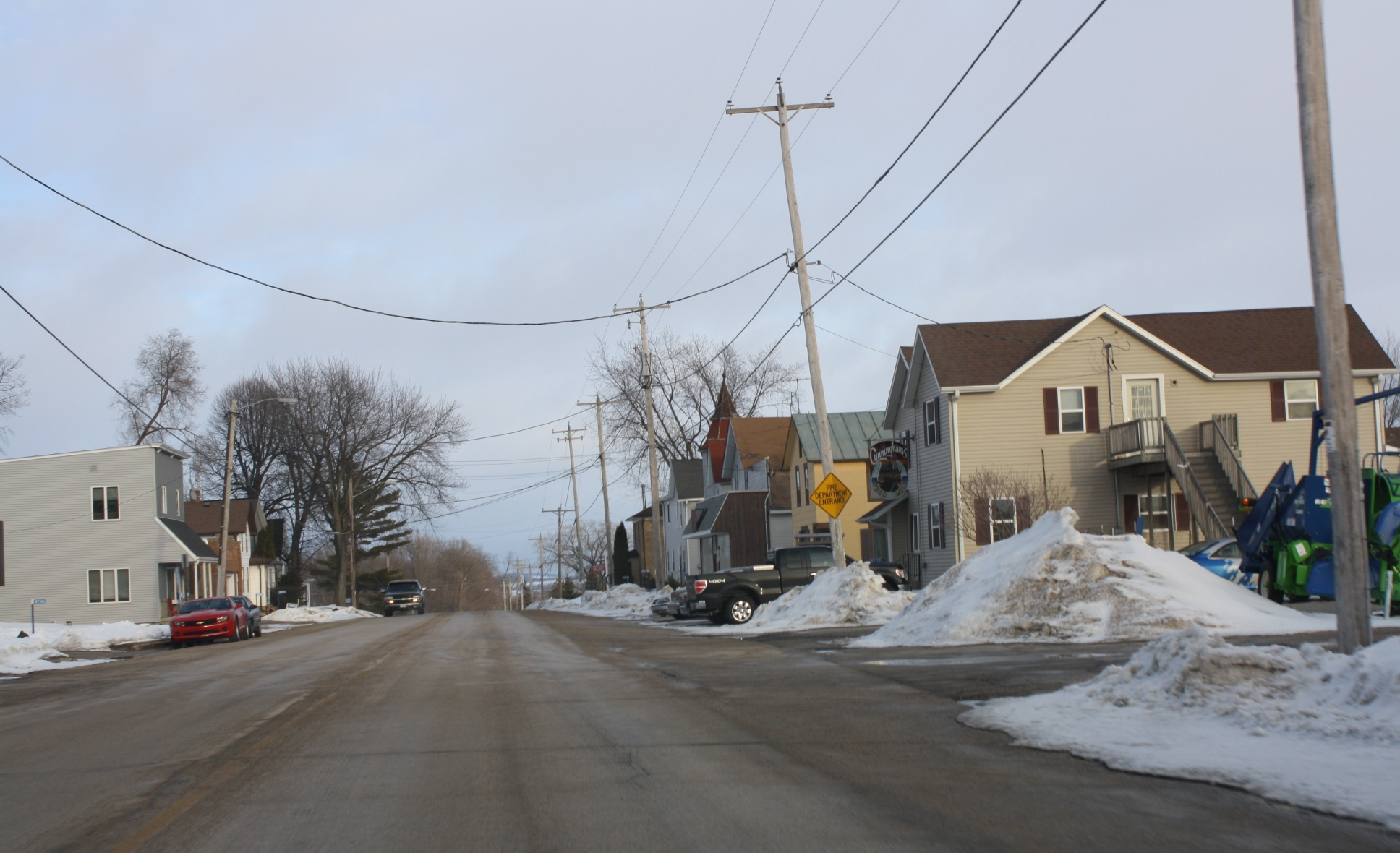
- Looking north at Knowles

- Location within the state of Wisconsin
- Coordinates: 43°34′22″N 88°30′15″W
- Country: United States
- State: Wisconsin
- County: Dodge
- Town: Lomira
- Elevation: 1,050 ft (320 m)
- Time zone: UTC-6 (Central (CST))
  - Summer (DST): UTC-5 (CDT)
- ZIP codes: 53043
- FIPS code: Class Code U6
- GNIS feature ID: 1567580

Knowles is an unincorporated community in Dodge County, Wisconsin, United States. The community is located where County Road AY diverges from County Road Y, in the town of Lomira. The community was named for George P. Knowles, the secretary for the Fond du Lac, Amboy & Peoria Railroad in the 1870s.

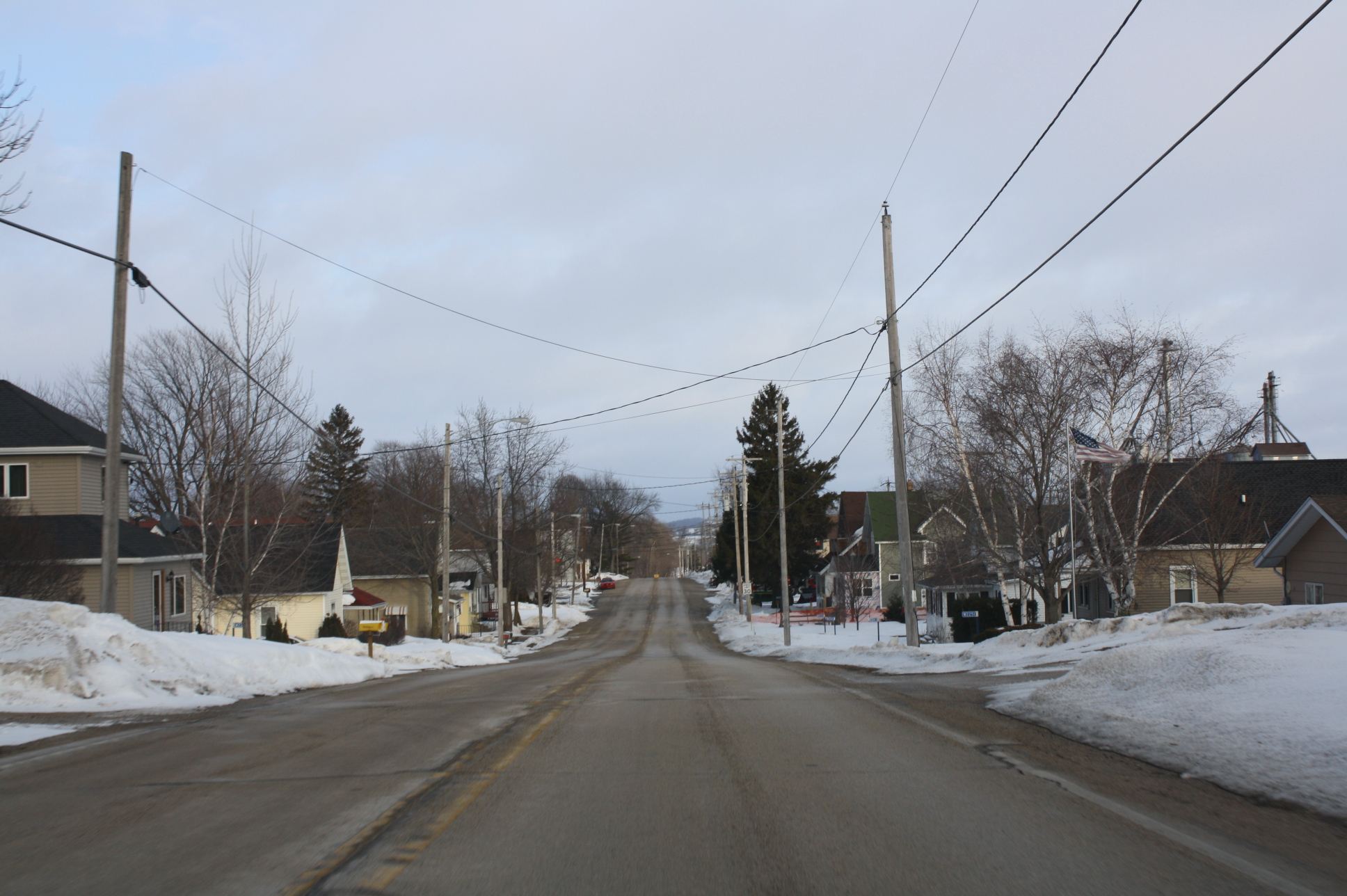
Looking east at downtown Knowles

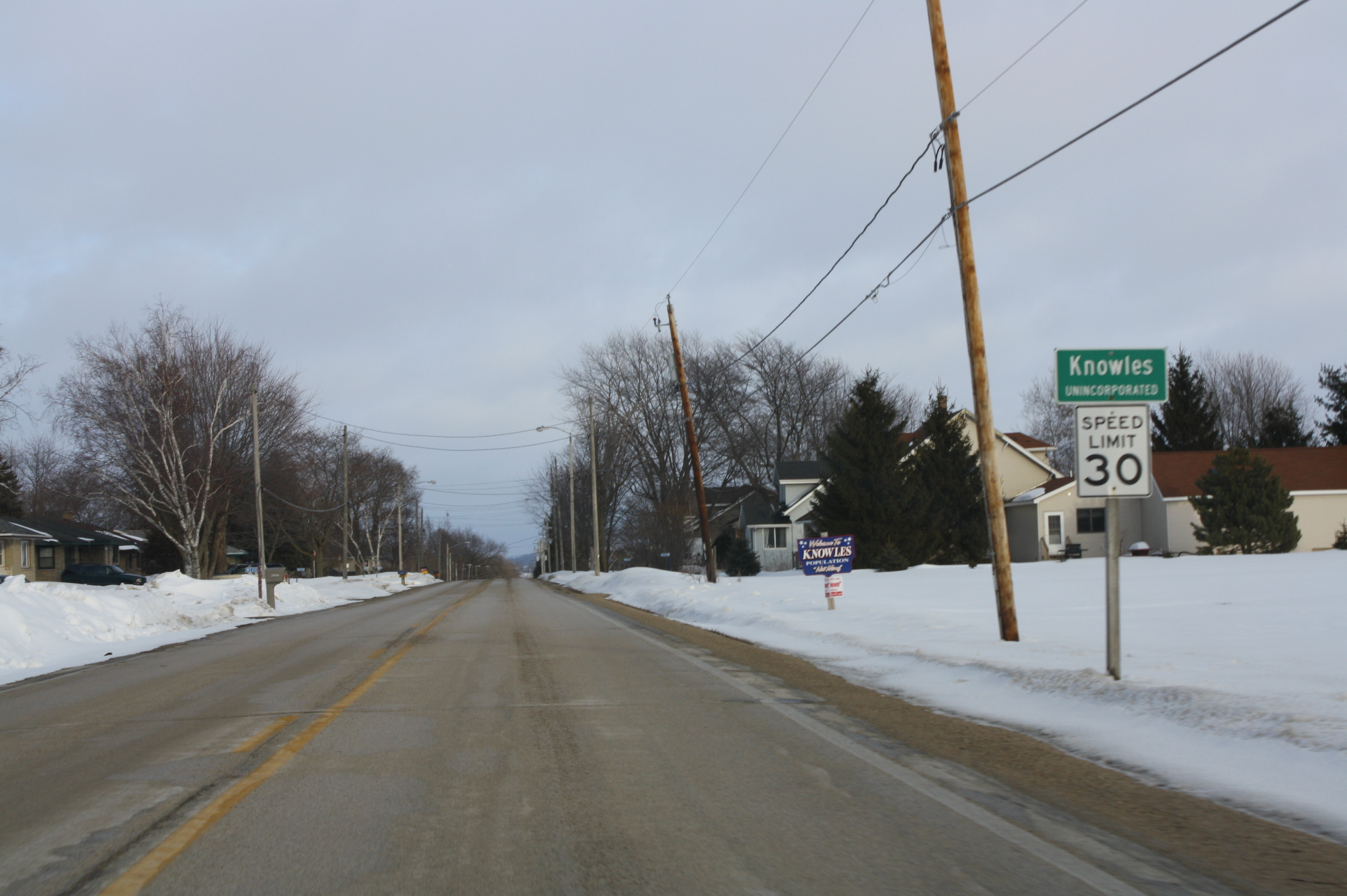
Welcome sign
