= Andrew Bachhuber =

American politician

Andrew Bachhuber (November 30, 1856 – 1922) was an American farmer and politician.

Born in LeRoy, Wisconsin to Maximilian J. Bachhuber and Theresia Engle, Bachhuber was a farmer and held several town offices. He served in the Wisconsin State Assembly in 1885 as a Democrat. His father, his son, Frank E. Bachhuber, and his granddaughter, Ruth Bachhuber Doyle, all served in the Wisconsin State Assembly as well. Bachhuber married Louise Sterr (1859–1939) with whom he raised at least seven children. He died in 1922 and he is interred in Mayville, Wisconsin.
