= LeRoy, Wisconsin =

- Town
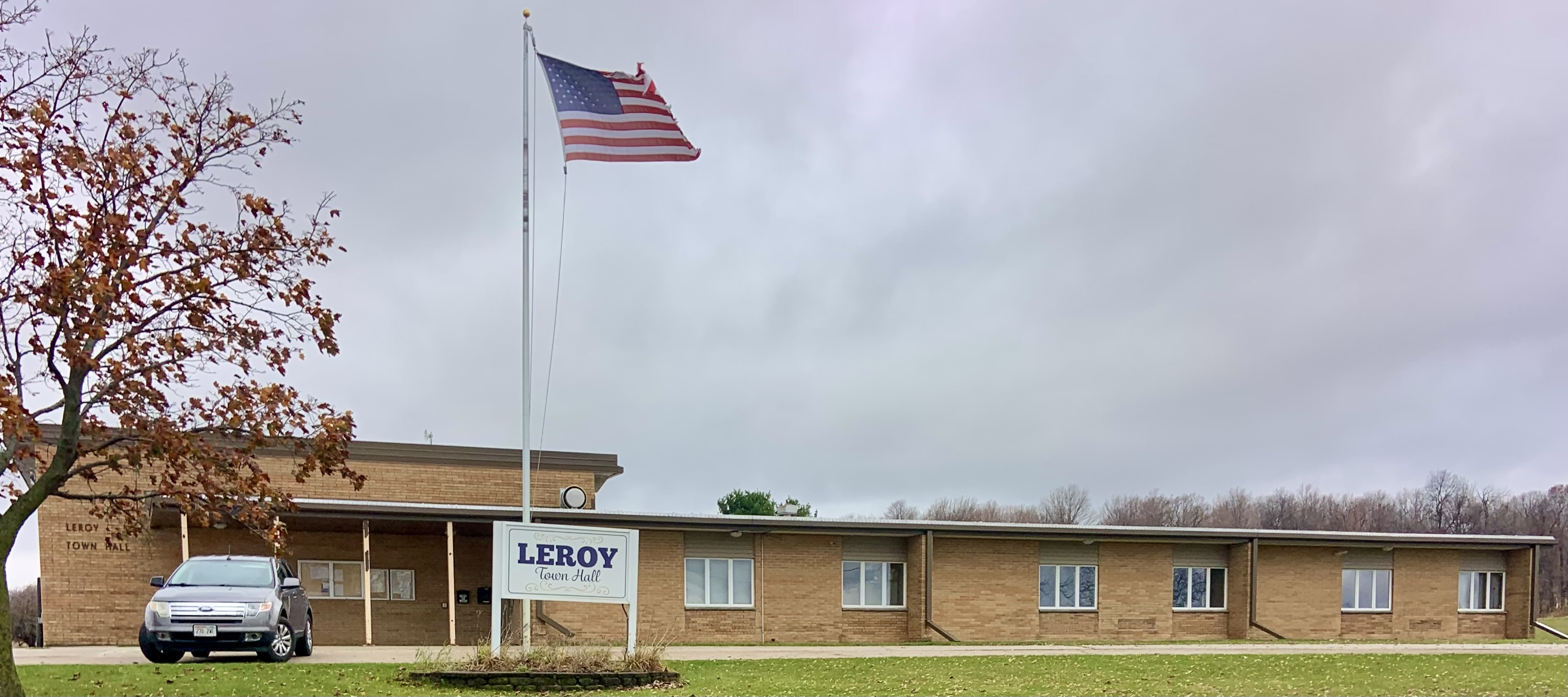
- Town hall

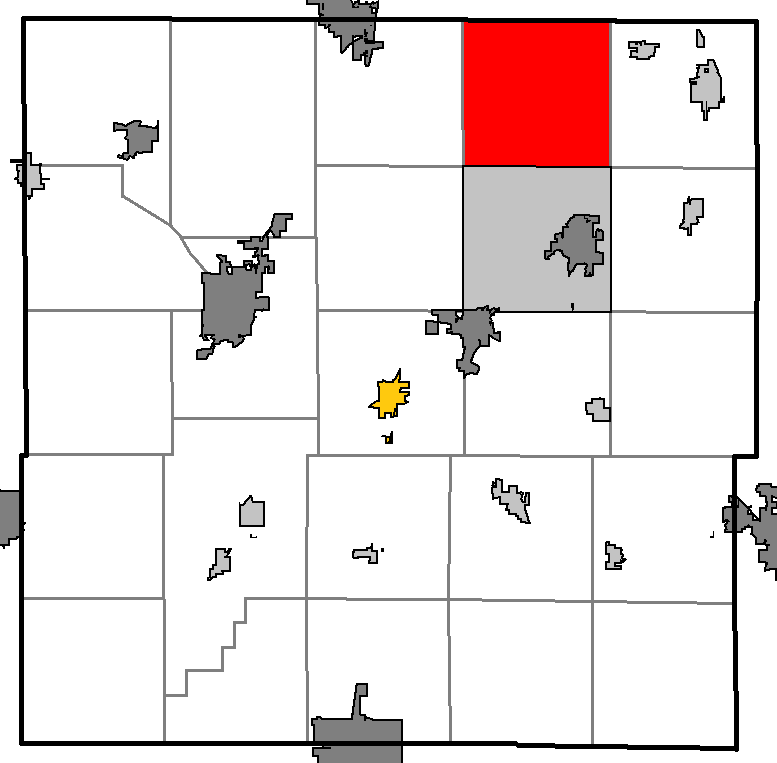
- Location of Leroy, within Dodge County
- Coordinates: 43°35′44″N 88°34′17″W
- Country: United States
- State: Wisconsin
- County: Dodge

Area
  - Total: 37.4 sq mi (96.8 km^{2})
  - Land: 36.6 sq mi (94.7 km^{2})
  - Water: 0.81 sq mi (2.1 km^{2})
- Elevation: 1,076 ft (328 m)

Population (2020)
  - Total: 956
  - Density: 26.1/sq mi (10.1/km^{2})
- Time zone: UTC-6 (Central (CST))
  - Summer (DST): UTC-5 (CDT)
- FIPS code: 55-43650
- GNIS feature ID: 1583546
- Website: http://www.townleroy.com

LeRoy is a town in Dodge County, Wisconsin, United States. The population was 956 at the 2020 census. The unincorporated communities of Farmersville and LeRoy are located in the town.

== Geography ==
According to the United States Census Bureau, the town has a total area of 37.4 square miles (96.8 km^{2}), of which 36.6 square miles (94.7 km^{2}) is land and 0.8 square mile (2.1 km^{2}) (2.22%) is water.

== Demographics ==
As of the census of 2000, 1,116 people, 389 households, and 317 families lived in the town. The population density was 30.5 people per square mile (11.8/km^{2}). There were 396 housing units at an average density of 10.8 per square mile (4.2/km^{2}). The racial makeup of the town was 99.10% White, 0.36% Native American, 0.45% Asian, 0.09% from other races. Hispanic or Latino of any race were 0.63% of the population.

There were 389 households, of which 35.5% had children under 18 living with them, 72.5% were married couples living together, 4.6% had a female householder with no husband present, and 18.5% were non-families. 15.9% of all households comprised individuals, and 8.7% had someone living alone who was 65 years of age or older. The average household size was 2.87, and the average family size was 3.20.

The town's population was spread out, with 27.3% under 18, 8.0% from 18 to 24, 29.0% from 25 to 44, 23.1% from 45 to 64, and 12.5% who were 65 or older. The median age was 37 years. For every 100 females, there were 108.6 males. For every 100 females age 18 and over, there were 109.0 males.

The median income for a household in the town was $53,333, and the median income for a family was $56,250. Males had a median income of $36,818 versus $25,481 for females. The per capita income for the town was $18,714. About 3.9% of families and 3.9% of the population were below the poverty line, including 2.3% of those under age 18 and 4.5% of those age 65 or over.

== Notable people ==
- Andrew Bachhuber, farmer and legislator
- Frank S. Bauer, businessman and legislator
- John M. Dihring, legislator
- William S. Schwefel, legislator
- Joseph Weix, legislator
