= Beaver Dam micropolitan area, Wisconsin =

Area in east central Wisconsin

Coordinates: 43°28′N 88°50′W

Beaver Dam Micropolitan Statistical Area
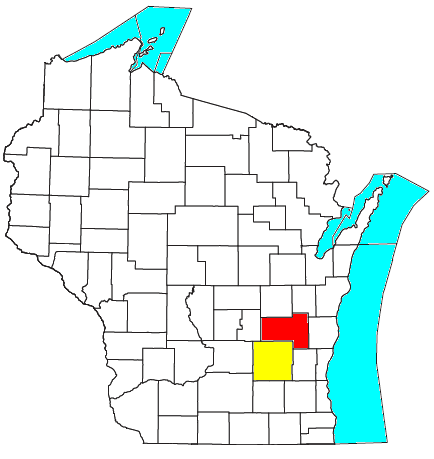
- Country: United States
- State: Wisconsin

The Beaver Dam Micropolitan Statistical Area is an area in east central Wisconsin. Its principal city is Beaver Dam, and it includes all of Dodge County. The Beaver Dam Micropolitan Statistical Area (MSA) and Fond du Lac MSA form the Fond du Lac Beaver Dam Combined Statistical Area. The MSA had an estimated population of 88,635 in 2024.

== Counties ==
Dodge County

== Cities ==
- Beaver Dam
- Columbus (partial)
- Fox Lake
- Hartford
- Horicon
- Juneau
- Mayville
- Watertown (partial)
- Waupun (partial)

=== Villages ===
- Brownsville
- Clyman
- Hustisford
- Iron Ridge
- Kekoskee
- Lomira
- Lowell
- Neosho
- Randolph
- Reeseville
- Theresa

=== Unincorporated Places ===
- Alderley
- Ashippun
- Burnett
- Knowles
- Lebanon
- LeRoy
- Minnesota Junction
- Rolling Prairie
- Rubicon
- South Beaver Dam
- Sugar Island
- Woodland

=== Towns ===
- Ashippun
- Beaver Dam
- Burnett
- Calamus
- Chester
- Clyman
- Elba
- Emmet
- Fox Lake
- Herman
- Hubbard
- Hustisford
- Lebanon
- LeRoy
- Lomira
- Lowell
- Oak Grove
- Portland
- Rubicon
- Shields, Wisconsin
- Theresa
- Trenton
- Westford
- Williamstown
