= Harman Grube =

American politician

Harman Grube (August 6, 1807 - ?) was an American farmer from Emmet, Dodge County, Wisconsin who spent a single term as a Reform Party member of the Wisconsin State Assembly.

== Background ==
Grube was born in the free city of Hamburg, Germany on August 6, 1807; received a common school education, and became a farmer. He came to Wisconsin in September, 1843, and settled at Watertown, and removed to nearby Emmet the next spring.

== Public office ==
He had been an assessor for five years, a county supervisor for eight years, and "poor master" of Dodge County for one year when he was elected in 1874 to represent the Assembly's 6th Dodge County District (the Towns of Ashippun, Emmet, Lebanon, and Shields). He received 454 votes as a Reform candidate (the Reform Party of this era was a short-lived coalition of Democrats, reform and Liberal Republicans, and Grangers formed in 1873), against 429 for Thomas O'Meara, who was running as a "regular Reform" nominee; the incumbent, Democrat John Dunn, Jr., was not a candidate. Grube was assigned to the standing committee on legislative expenditures.

He did not run for re-election in 1875, and was succeeded by fellow Reformer James Higgins.
