= Lebanon, Wisconsin =

Lebanon is the name of some places in the U.S. state of Wisconsin:

- Lebanon, Dodge County, Wisconsin, a town
- Lebanon (CDP), Wisconsin, a census-designated place
  - Old Lebanon, Wisconsin, an unincorporated community
- Lebanon, Waupaca County, Wisconsin, a town
