= James Higgins (Wisconsin politician) =

American politician

James Higgins (March 25, 1824 – January 26, 1910) was an Irish-born American farmer from Shields, Wisconsin who spent a single term, in 1876, as a Reform Party member of the Wisconsin State Assembly from Dodge County.

== Background ==
Higgins was born in County Sligo, Ireland on March 25, 1824. He received a common school education, and became a farmer. He came to Wisconsin in 1851, and settled in the Town of Shields.

== Public office ==
He had served seven years as chairman of his town, several years as a justice of the peace, and two years (1871-1872) as Dodge County county clerk, when in 1875 he was elected to the Assembly from Dodge County's 6th Assembly district (the Towns of Ashippun, Emmet, Lebanon, and Shields). He received 420 votes as a candidate of the Reform Party (a short-lived coalition of Democrats, reform and Liberal Republicans, and Grangers formed in 1873), against 397 votes for Thomas O'Meara, the regular Democratic nominee (who had run as a "regular Reform" candidate the year before). (Reform incumbent Harman Grube was not a candidate for re-election.) He was assigned to the standing committee on medical societies.

The Assembly was redistricted for the 1877 session (Dodge County went from six seats to four); the new district which included Shields was taken by Democrat Patrick Roche.

== After the Assembly ==
Higgins left Shields for Minnesota about 1885, and dwelt there for ten years before returning to Wisconsin. He died in Milwaukee on January 26, 1910, at the age of 85, although a newspaper obituary listed his birth date as 1822, his place of birth as Roscommon and his age at death at 88.
