= George G. King (politician) =

American politician

George G. King (1801 - October 18, 1854) was a farmer from Shields, Wisconsin, who served a single one-year term as a member of the Wisconsin State Assembly from Dodge County for the 1849 (2nd Wisconsin Legislature) session. He was a Democrat.

In February 1846, he was one of three commissioners appointed by the legislature of Wisconsin Territory to lay out a road from Watertown to Madison.

== Legislature ==
At the time of his taking office in the Assembly, he is described as being 47 years old, a farmer, from New York (state), and having been in Wisconsin for four years. His district included the Towns of Ashippun, Emmett, Hustisford and Lebanon; it had previously been represented by fellow Democrat Benjamin Randall.

== Personal life ==
On May 12, 1852, it was reported that his barn had burned to the ground in an accidental fire. The Watertown Register observed, "This calamity falls heavily upon our neighbor King, who is ill able to bear it."

He died October 19, 1854, at the age of 52, after a long illness.
