= Hans Olsen =

Hans Olsen may refer to:

- Hans Olsen (cyclist) (1885–1969), Danish Olympic cyclist
- Hans Olsen (fencer) (1886–1976), Danish Olympic fencer
- Hans Olsen (furniture designer) (1919–1992), Danish furniture designer
- Hans Olsen (American football) (born 1977), American football player
- Hans Pauli Olsen (born 1957), Faroese sculptor

== See also ==
- Hans Olson (born 1952), American musician and songwriter,
- Hans H. Olson, politician
- Hans Olsson (disambiguation)
- Olsen (surname)
