= Old Ashippun, Wisconsin =

- Unincorporated community
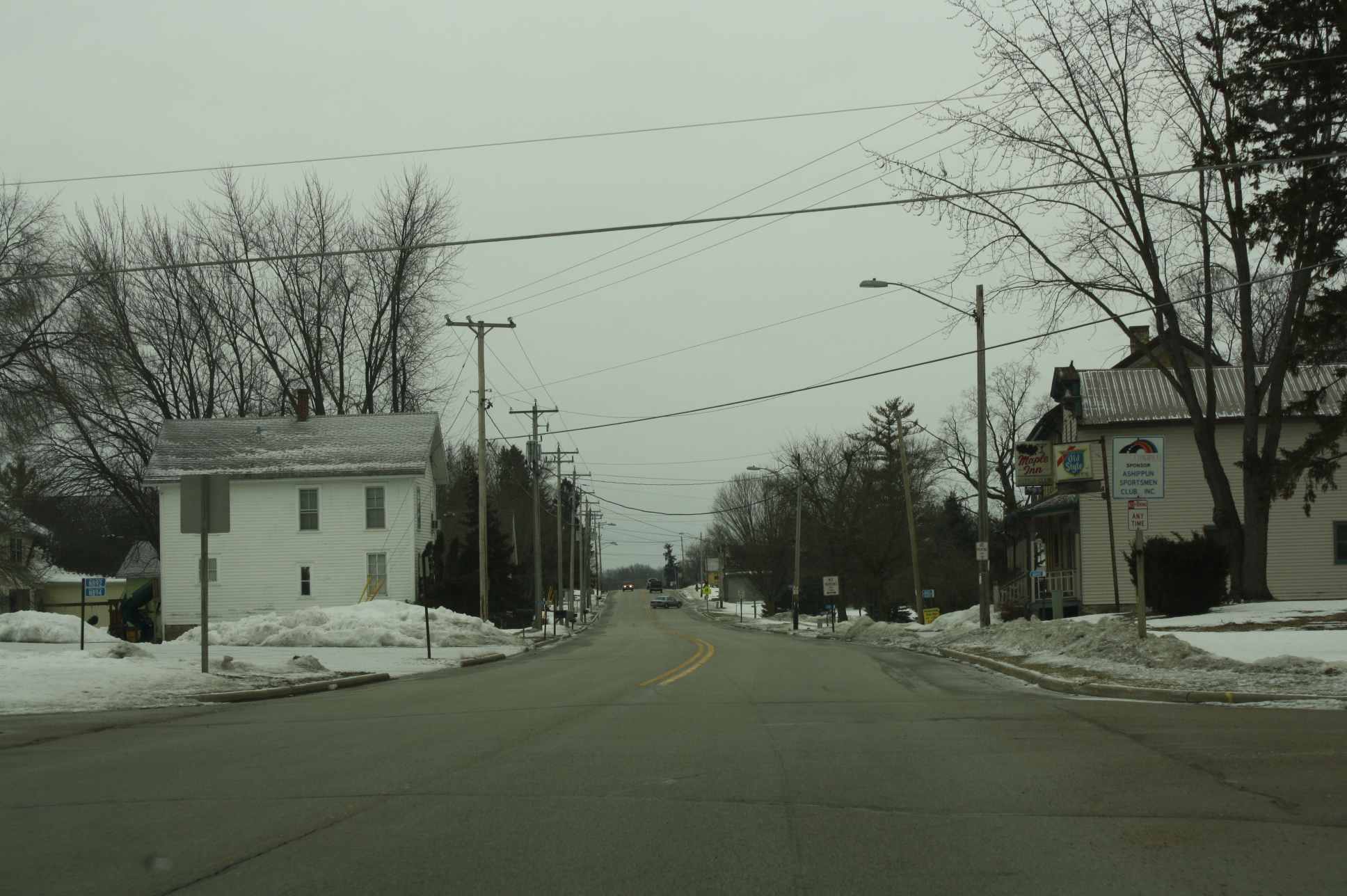
- Looking south at Old Ashippun

- Location within Wisconsin Location within the United States
- Coordinates: 43°13′29″N 88°31′11″W
- Country: United States
- State: Wisconsin
- County: Dodge
- Town: Ashippun
- Elevation: 879 ft (268 m)
- Time zone: UTC-6 (Central (CST))
  - Summer (DST): UTC-5 (CDT)
- Area code: 920
- GNIS feature ID: 1570768

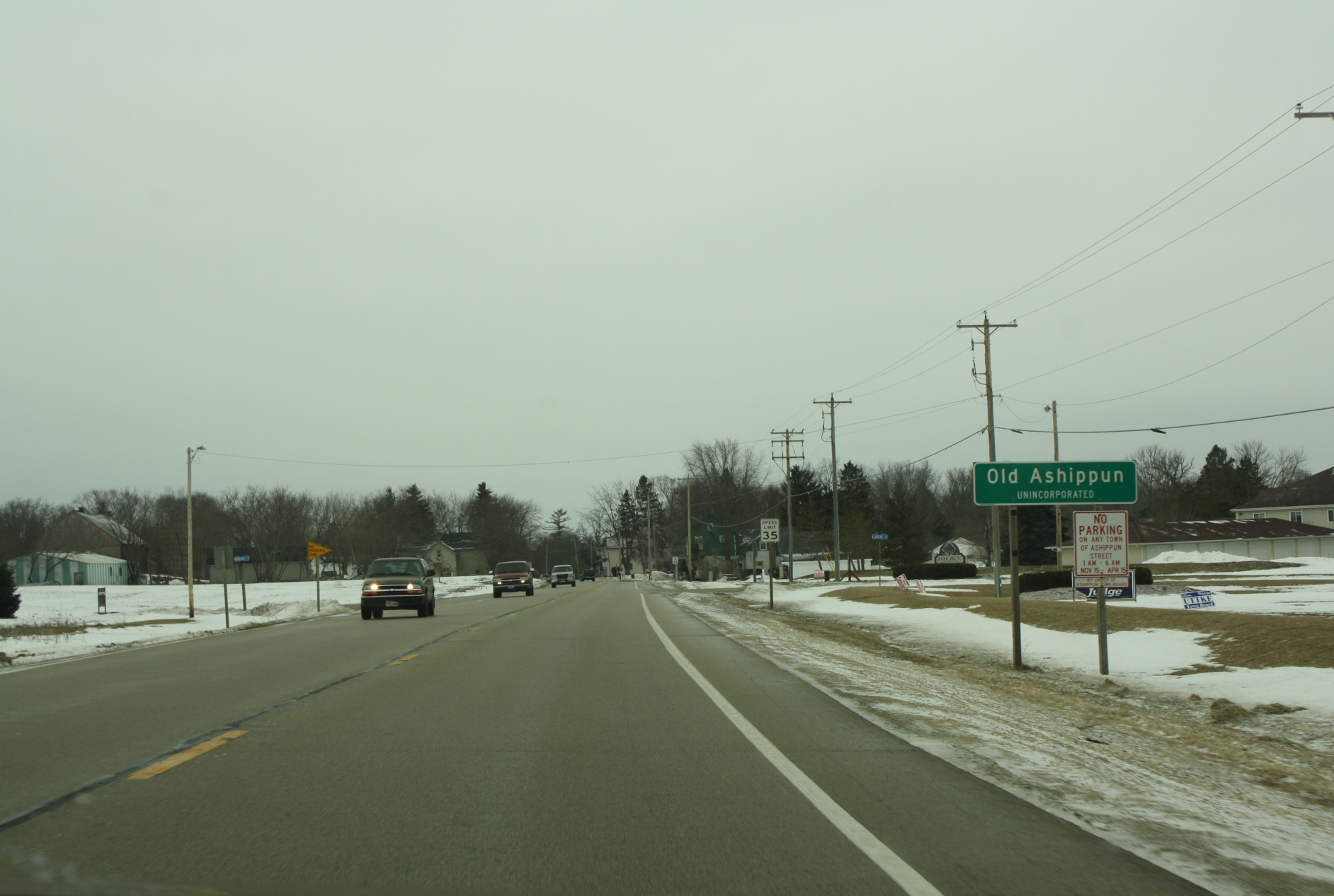
Looking south at the sign for Old Ashippun

Old Ashippun is an unincorporated community located in the town of Ashippun, Dodge County, Wisconsin, United States.

The primary community area is actually split into two parts, Ashippun and Old Ashippun. Old Ashippun was the original location, but when the first railroad was built several miles away, a large portion of the community relocated, as also took place in nearby Lebanon.
