= Solon (surname) =

Solon is a surname. Notable people with the surname include:

- Camille Solon (1877–1960), British muralist and ceramist, son of Marc-Louis Solon
- Ewen Solon (1917–1985), New Zealand-born actor
- John Solon (1842–1921), American politician
- Jose Solon (fl. 1928–1936), Filipino politician
- Laura Solon (born 1979), English screenwriter, comedian and actress
- Léon-Victor Solon (1873–1957), English painter, ceramist and graphic artist, son of Marc-Louis Solon
- Lorin Solon (1892–1967), American college football player
- Marc-Louis Solon (1835–1913), French porcelain artist
- Sam Solon (1931–2001), American politician
- Sheila Solon (born c. 1959), American politician
- Steve Solon, Filipino politician first elected Governor of the province of Sarangani in 2013
- Thomas F. Solon (1853–1923), American businessman and politician
- Vivian Solon (born 1962), Australian who was unlawfully deported to the Philippines in 2001
- Yvonne Prettner Solon (born 1946), American politician, former lieutenant governor of Minnesota
- Florentino Solon (1931–2020), Filipino nutritionist and politician
