= Solon (disambiguation) =

Solon (c. 638 BC–558 BC) was an Athenian statesman, lawmaker and poet.

Solon may also refer to:

== People ==
- Solon (given name)
- Solon (surname)
- Solon people, a subgroup of the Evenks living in northeastern China

== Places in the United States ==
- Solon, Iowa, a city
- Solon, Maine, a town
- Solon, New York, a town
- Solon, Ohio, a city

== Other uses ==
- Solon SE, a German solar energy company
- Solon High School, Solon, Ohio
- Solon language, former name of the Evenki language
- Sacramento Solons, any of several minor league baseball teams in Sacramento, California
- Solon, the deceased King of the Elves in the 2005 Xbox 360 video game Kameo: Elements of Power
- A term for "mentor" or "teacher" in the Nickelodeon show Mysticons

== See also ==
- Solon Township, Leelanau County, Michigan
- Solon Township, Kent County, Michigan
