= Hans Olsson =

Hans Olsson may refer to:

- Hans Olsson (politician) (born 1951), Swedish politician of the Social Democratic Party
- Hans Olsson (alpine skier) (born 1984), Swedish alpine skier
- Hans Olsson (canoeist) (born 1964), Swedish sprint canoer
- Hans Olsson (handballer) (1929-2007), Swedish handballer, two times world champion.

== See also ==
- Hans Olson (born 1952), American musician and songwriter
- Hans H. Olson (1847–1912), politician
- Hans Olsen (disambiguation)
- Olsson (surname)
