= Solon Township =

Solon Township may refer to:

- Solon Township, Kent County, Michigan
- Solon Township, Leelanau County, Michigan
- Solon Township, Hettinger County, North Dakota, in Hettinger County, North Dakota
- Solon Township, Cuyahoga County, Ohio, defunct

== See also ==
- Solun, Horqin Right Front Banner, a township-level unit in China's Inner Mongolia
- Solon (disambiguation)
