= Alderley =

Alderley may refer to several places:

== Australia ==
- Alderley, Queensland

== United Kingdom ==
- Alderley, Cheshire
- Alderley, Gloucestershire

== United States ==
- Alderley, Wisconsin

== See also ==
=== United Kingdom ===
- Alderley Edge, Cheshire
- Over Alderley, Cheshire
- Nether Alderley, Cheshire
