= Henry R. Moldenhauer =

American politician

Henry R. Moldenhauer (October 1, 1855 – April 24, 1925) was an American businessman and politician.

Born in the town of Lebanon, Dodge County, Wisconsin, Moldenhauer went to the parochial and public schools. He grew up on a farm. Moldenhauer was in the general mercantile business, He was also in the dairy and cheese making business. Moldenhauer was also involved with the fire insurance business. From 1901 to 1905, Moldenhauer served in the Wisconsin State Assembly. Moldenhauer died from cancer at his home in Watertown, Wisconsin.
