= Herman A. Ziemer =

American politician

Herman A. Ziemer (February 23, 1861 – June 10, 1941) was an American farmer and politician.

Born in the town of Lebanon, Dodge County, Wisconsin, Ziemer lived in the town of Shields and was a farmer. He was the son of Heinrich and Caroline (Schwantes) Ziemer. He served as chairman of the Emmet Town Board and was a Republican. Ziemer served in the Wisconsin State Assembly in 1921 and 1923. He died at his home in the town of Lebanon in Dodge County, Wisconsin. He was buried in the Evangelical Lutheran Cemetery, Watertown, Dodge County, Wisconsin. He was preceded in death by his wife Adina (Hildemann). He was survived by his children Adela, Arthur, Aurelia, and George.
