= Ashippun (CDP), Wisconsin =

Census-designated place in Wisconsin, United States

Ashippun, Wisconsin
- Census-designated place
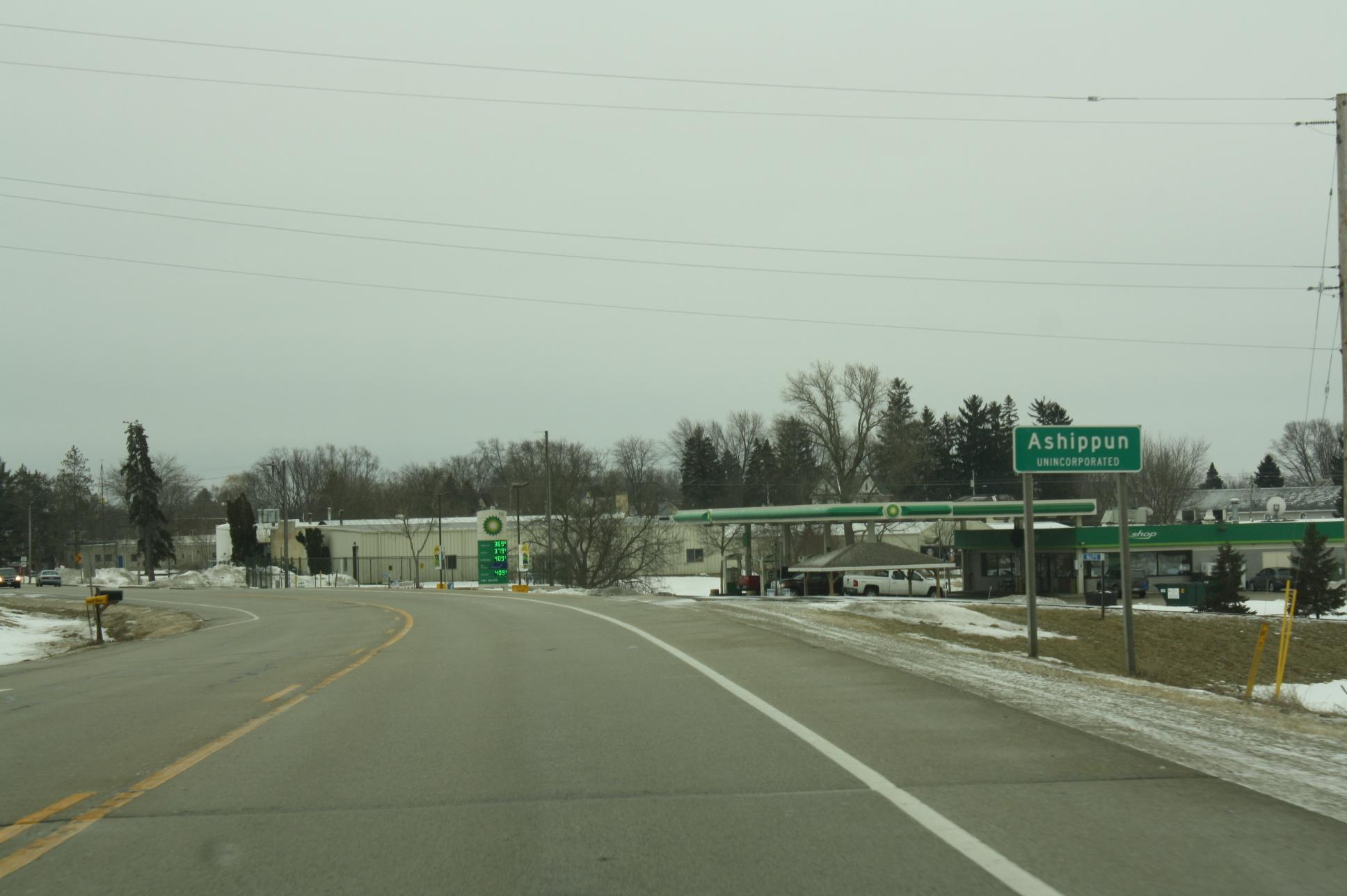
- Road Sign When Entering Ashippun

- Location within Wisconsin
- Coordinates: 43°12′43″N 88°30′58″W
- Country: United States
- State: Wisconsin
- County: Dodge
- Town: Ashippun

Area
  - Total: 1.03 sq mi (2.66 km^{2})
  - Land: 1.03 sq mi (2.66 km^{2})
  - Water: 0 sq mi (0.00 km^{2})
- Elevation: 860 ft (260 m)

Population (2020)
  - Total: 1,166
  - Density: 1,140/sq mi (438/km^{2})
- Time zone: UTC-6 (Central (CST))
  - Summer (DST): UTC-5 (CDT)
- ZIP code: 53003
- Area code: 920
- GNIS feature ID: 1560978

Ashippun is an unincorporated census-designated place located in the town of Ashippun, Dodge County, Wisconsin, United States. Ashippun is located on Wisconsin Highway 67, 7 miles (11 km) south of Neosho. Ashippun has a post office with ZIP code 53003. At the 2020 census, its population was 1,166, more than triple the population of 333 in 2010.

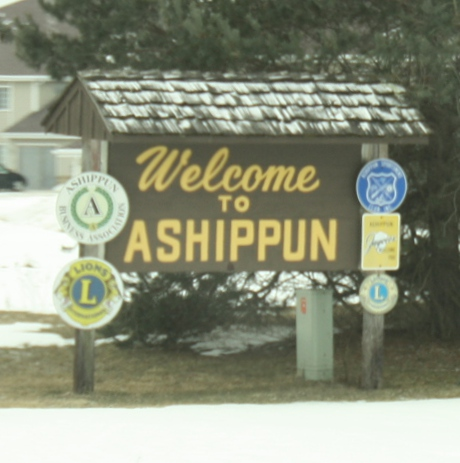
Welcome sign

The primary community area is actually split into two sections, Ashippun and Old Ashippun. Old Ashippun was the original location, but when the first railroad was built several miles away, a large portion of the community relocated, as occurred with nearby Lebanon.

== Demographics ==
Historical population
Census	Pop.	Note	%±
2010	333		—
2020	1,166		250.2%
U.S. Decennial Census
