= Dodge County Airport =

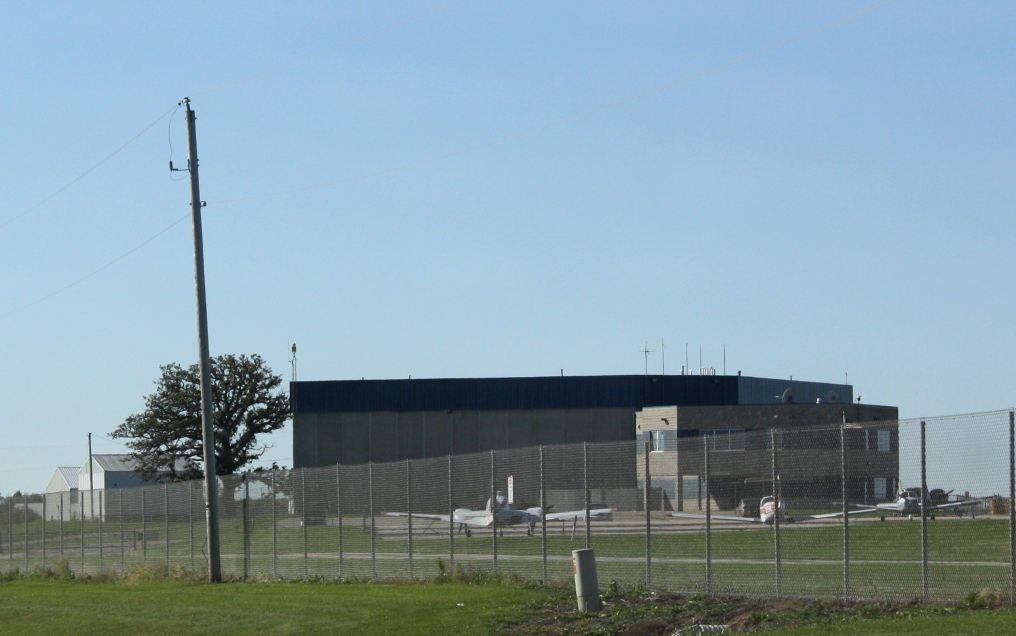
- Hangar

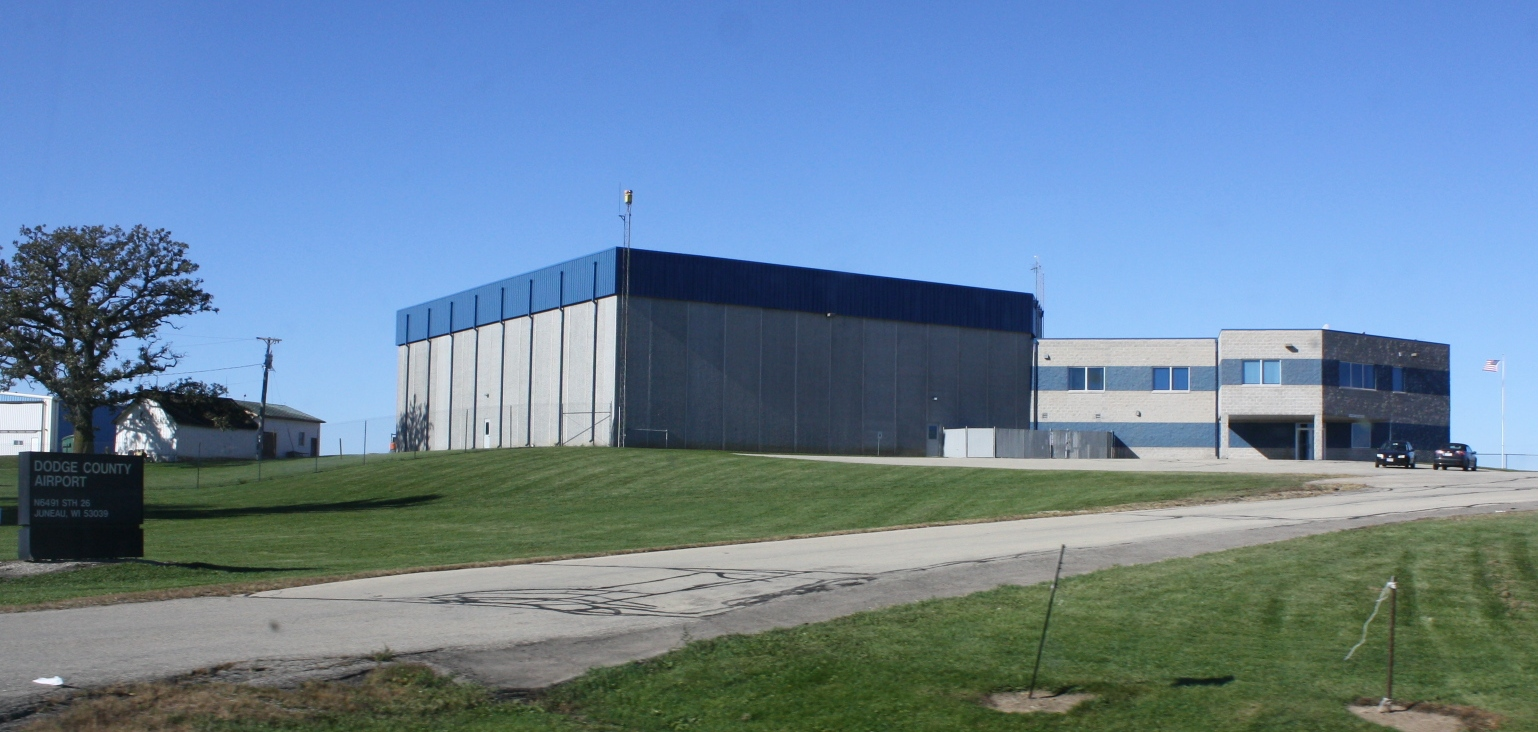
- Entrance
- IATA: UNU; ICAO: KUNU; FAA LID: UNU

Summary
- Airport type: Public
- Owner/Operator: Dodge County, Wisconsin
- Location: Juneau, Wisconsin
- Opened: July 1979
- Time zone: CST (UTC−06:00)
  - Summer (DST): CDT (UTC−05:00)
- Elevation AMSL: 934 ft (285 m)
- Coordinates: 43°25′35″N 088°42′14″W

Map
- Location of airport in Wisconsin UNU (the United States)

Runways
Direction	Length		Surface
Direction	ft	m	Surface
8/26	5,070	1,545	Asphalt
2/20	4,028	1,228	Asphalt

Statistics
- Aircraft operations (2021): 29,000
- Based aircraft (2024): 50
- Source: Federal Aviation Administration

Dodge County Airport (IATA: UNU, ICAO: KUNU, FAA LID: UNU) is a county-owned public-use airport in Dodge County, Wisconsin, United States. It is located two nautical miles (4 km) north of the central business district of Juneau, Wisconsin. It is situated along Wisconsin Highway 26.

It is included in the Federal Aviation Administration (FAA) National Plan of Integrated Airport Systems for 2025–2029, in which it is categorized as a regional general aviation facility.

== Facilities and aircraft ==
Dodge County Airport covers an area of 580 acres (235 ha) at an elevation of 934 feet (285 m) above mean sea level. It has two asphalt paved runways: the primary runway 8/26 is 5,070 by 100 feet (1,545 x 30 m) and LOC/DME equipped; the crosswind runway 2/20 is 4,028 by 75 feet (1,228 x 23 m).

For the 12-month period ending May 24, 2021, the airport had 29,000 aircraft operations, an average of 79 per day: 94% general aviation, 3% air taxi and 3% military. In August 2024, there were 50 aircraft based at this airport: 45 single-engine, 4 multi-engine and 1 jet.

The JUNEAU (UNU) non-directional beacon, 344 kHz, is located on the field.

Wisconsin Aviation is the fixed-base operator for the airport.

== See also ==
- List of airports in Wisconsin
