= Randolph, Wisconsin =

- Village
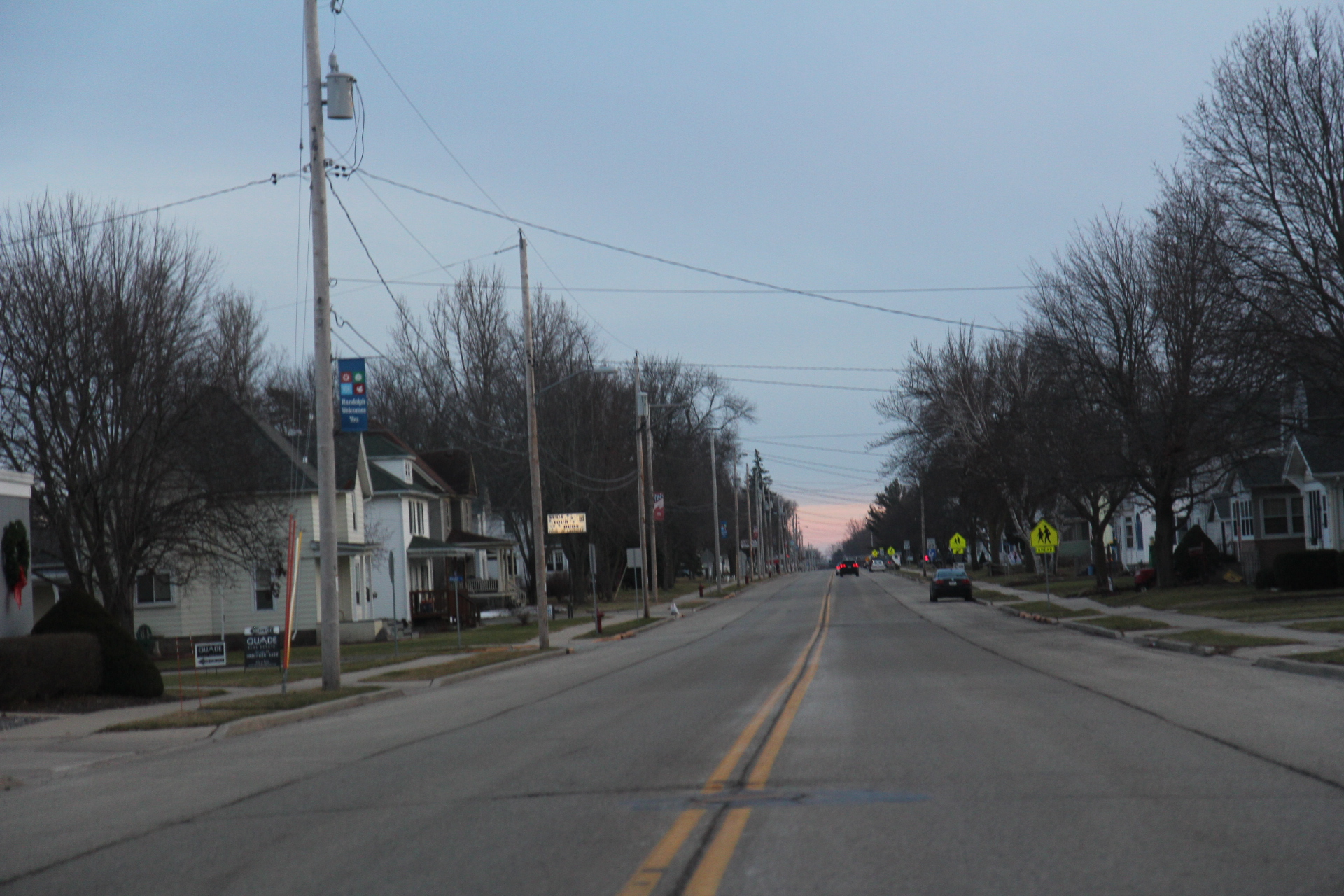
- Looking south in Randolph on WIS 73

- Location of Randolph in Dodge County, Wisconsin
- Coordinates: 43°34′40″N 89°3′15″W
- Country: United States
- State: Wisconsin
- Counties: Columbia, Dodge

Area
  - Total: 1.24 sq mi (3.22 km^{2})
  - Land: 1.24 sq mi (3.22 km^{2})
  - Water: 0 sq mi (0 km^{2})
- Elevation: 961 ft (293 m)

Population (2020)
  - Total: 1,796
  - Density: 1,440/sq mi (558/km^{2})
- Time zone: UTC-6 (Central (CST))
  - Summer (DST): UTC-5 (CDT)
- Area code: 920
- FIPS code: 55-66175
- GNIS feature ID: 1572065
- Website: www.randolphwis.com

Randolph is a village in Columbia and Dodge counties in the U.S. state of Wisconsin. The population was 1,796 at the 2020 census. Of this, 1,338 were in Dodge County, and 458 were in Columbia County. The village is located at the southeast corner of the Town of Randolph in Columbia County, although only a tiny portion of the village lies within the town. Most of the village lies within the Town of Westford in Dodge County. Small portions also lie within the Town of Fox Lake (also in Dodge County) to the north and the Town of Courtland in Columbia County.

The Dodge County portion of Randolph is part of the Beaver Dam Micropolitan Area, while the Columbia County portion is part of the Madison, Wisconsin metropolitan area.

== Geography ==
According to the United States Census Bureau, the village has a total area of 1.23 square miles (3.19 km^{2}), all land.

== Demographics ==
Historical population
| Census | Pop. | Note | %± |
|---|---|---|---|
| 1870 | 61 | | — |
| 1880 | 421 | | 590.2% |
| 1890 | 405 | | −3.8% |
| 1900 | 738 | | 82.2% |
| 1910 | 937 | | 27.0% |
| 1920 | 1,183 | | 26.3% |
| 1930 | 1,161 | | −1.9% |
| 1940 | 1,146 | | −1.3% |
| 1950 | 1,350 | | 17.8% |
| 1960 | 1,507 | | 11.6% |
| 1970 | 1,582 | | 5.0% |
| 1980 | 1,691 | | 6.9% |
| 1990 | 1,729 | | 2.2% |
| 2000 | 1,869 | | 8.1% |
| 2010 | 1,811 | | −3.1% |
| 2020 | 1,796 | | −0.8% |
U.S. Decennial Census

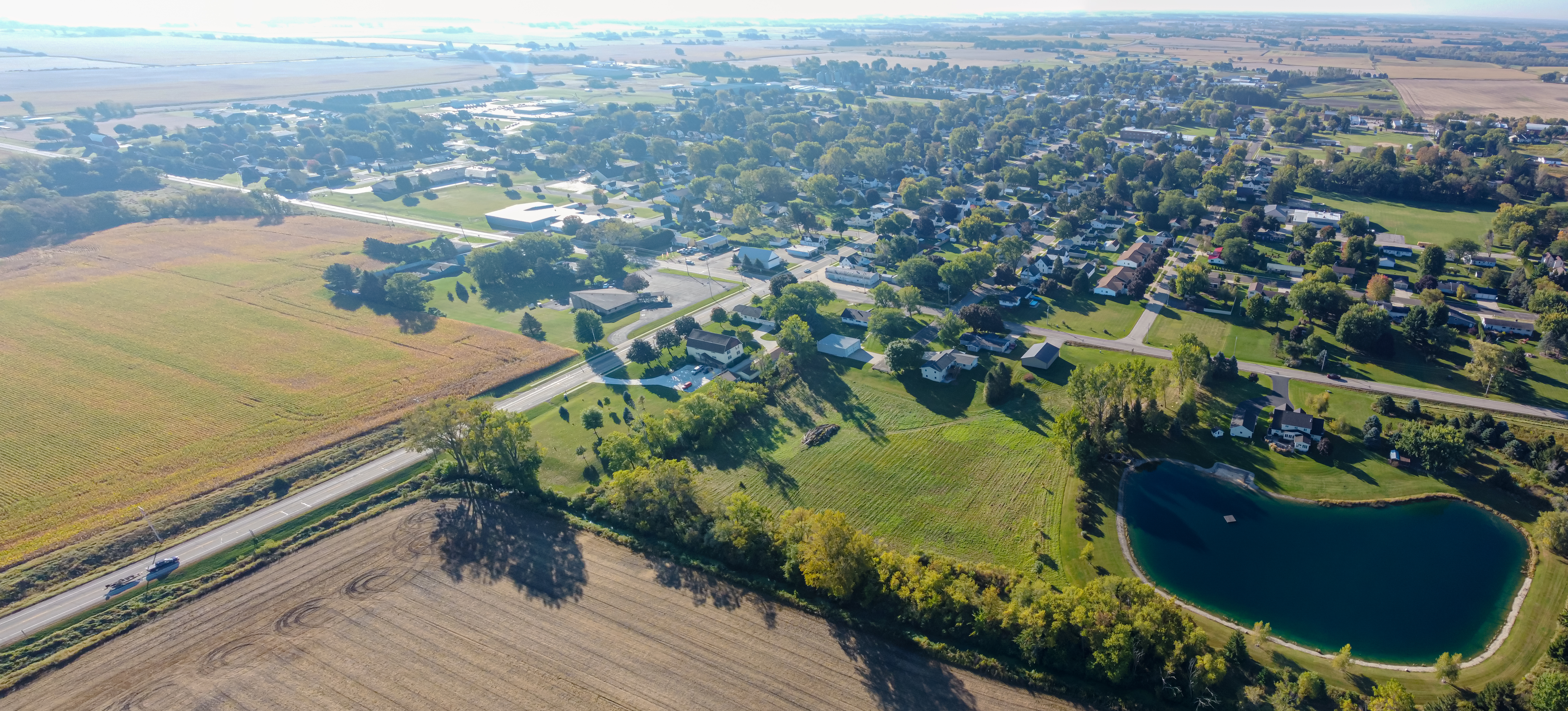
Randolph

=== 2010 census ===
As of the census of 2010, there were 1,811 people, 674 households, and 443 families living in the village. The population density was 1,472.4 inhabitants per square mile (568.5/km^{2}). There were 728 housing units at an average density of 591.9 per square mile (228.5/km^{2}). The racial makeup of the village was 96.7% White, 0.2% African American, 0.4% Native American, 0.2% Asian, 1.5% from other races, and 1.1% from two or more races. Hispanic or Latino people of any race were 4.7% of the population.

There were 674 households, of which 35.2% had children under the age of 18 living with them, 51.5% were married couples living together, 10.7% had a female householder with no husband present, 3.6% had a male householder with no wife present, and 34.3% were non-families. 29.7% of all households were made up of individuals, and 15.5% had someone living alone who was 65 years of age or older. The average household size was 2.51 and the average family size was 3.12.

The median age in the village was 39.3 years. 27.1% of residents were under the age of 18; 6.3% were between the ages of 18 and 24; 23.9% were from 25 to 44; 22.5% were from 45 to 64; and 20.3% were 65 years of age or older. The gender makeup of the village was 47.3% male and 52.7% female.

=== 2000 census ===
As of the census of 2000, there were 1,869 people, 698 households, and 483 families living in the village. The population density was 1,750.3 people per square mile (674.4/km^{2}). There were 752 housing units at an average density of 704.2 per square mile (271.4/km^{2}). The racial makeup of the village was 98.77% White, 0.11% Black or African American, 0.11% Native American, 0.16% Asian, 0.27% from other races, and 0.59% from two or more races. Hispanic or Latino people of any race were 1.44% of the population.

There were 698 households, out of which 35% had children under the age of 18 living with them, 57.7% were married couples living together, 8.7% had a female householder with no husband present, and 30.7% were non-families. 27.4% of all households were made up of individuals, and 16.2% had someone living alone who was 65 years of age or older. The average household size was 2.54 and the average family size was 3.11.

In the village, the population was spread out, with 26.2% under the age of 18, 8.5% from 18 to 24, 26.1% from 25 to 44, 18.8% from 45 to 64, and 20.4% who were 65 years of age or older. The median age was 38 years. For every 100 females, there were 93.5 males. For every 100 females age 18 and over, there were 84.2 males.

The median income for a household in the village was $39,620, and the median income for a family was $47,847. Males had a median income of $34,671 versus $23,424 for females. The per capita income for the village was $18,517. About 3.6% of families and 7.2% of the population were below the poverty line, including 9.4% of those under age 18 and 6.5% of those age 65 or over.

== Education ==
- Randolph High School is the area public high school.

== Notable people ==
- Jack Horkheimer, astronomer, television host
- Joseph Kerr, Wisconsin state representative
- Burton A. Scott, chief judge of the Wisconsin Court of Appeals
- Greg Stiemsma, basketball player
- Byron F. Wackett, Wisconsin state representative
