= Jesse A. Canniff =

American farmer, businessman, and politician

Jesse Canniff

Member of the Wisconsin State Assembly
- In office 1943–1949

Member of the Beaver Dam Common Council
- In office 1936–1942

Personal details
- Born: Jesse Anson Cannif; April 30, 1900 Juneau, Wisconsin
- Died: November 16, 1966 (aged 66) Beaver Dam, Wisconsin
- Party: Republican
- Education: Beaver Dam Business College

Jesse Anson Canniff (April 30, 1900 – November 16, 1966) was an American farmer, businessman, and politician.

== Biography ==
Born on a farm near Juneau, Wisconsin, Canniff attended high school and Beaver Dam Business College in Beaver Dam, Wisconsin. Canniff was a farmer until 1926. He then served as president of Canniff Oil, Inc. He also served as chairman of the American National Bank and as director of the Wayland Academy. Caniff lived in Beaver Dam, Wisconsin and served on the Beaver Dam Common Council from 1936 to 1942. From 1943 to 1949, Canniff served in the Wisconsin State Assembly as a Republican. Canniff died in a hospital in Beaver Dam, Wisconsin after suffering a stroke.
