= St. Joseph's Roman Catholic Church (Shields, Wisconsin) =

Historic church in Wisconsin, United States

- U.S. National Register of Historic Places
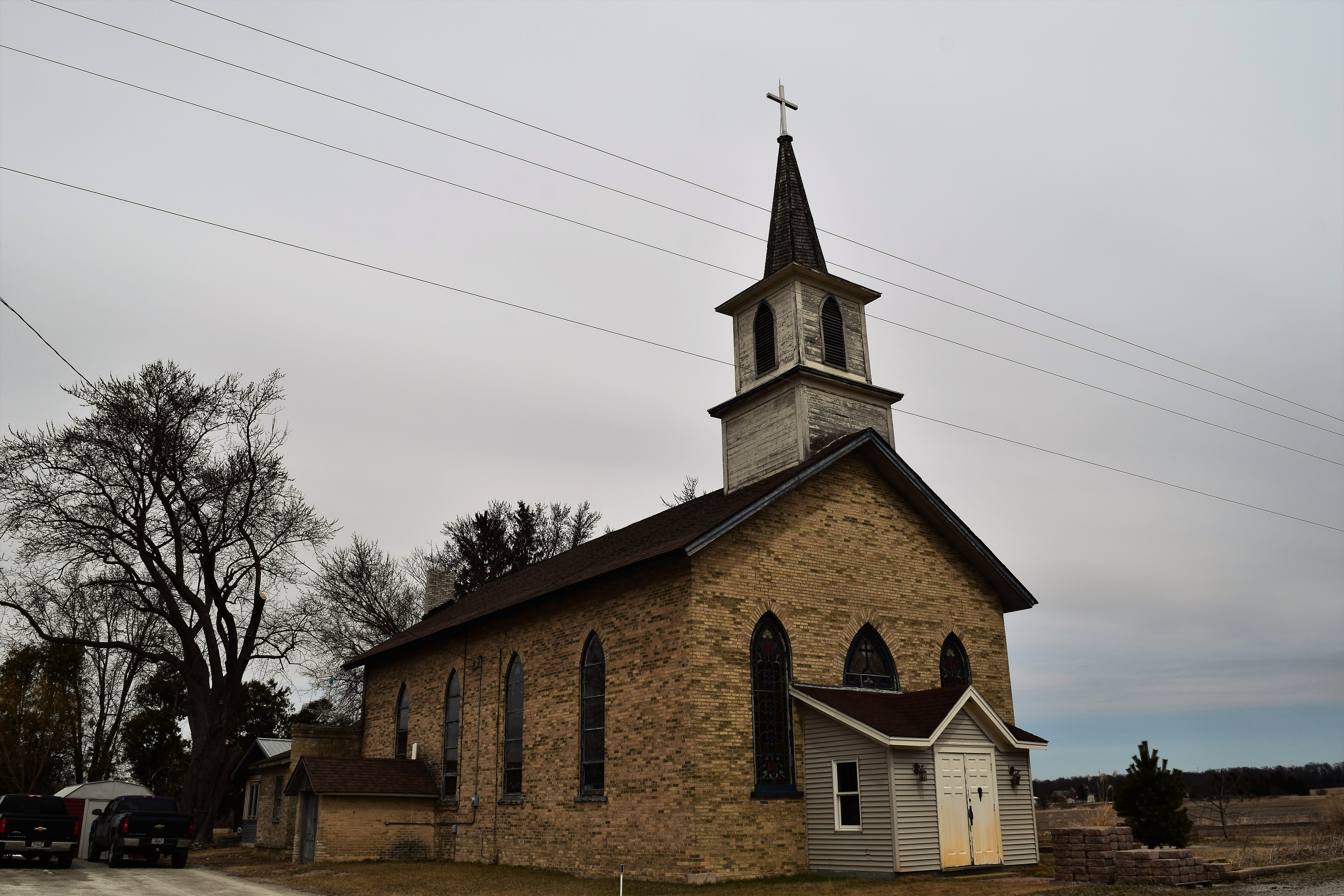

- Location within Wisconsin Location within the United States
- Location: County Highway Q and Rich Rd., Shields, Wisconsin
- Coordinates: 43°14′28″N 88°47′16″W
- Area: 3.8 acres (1.5 ha)
- Built: 1864
- Architect: James Clancy
- Architectural style: Country Church Gothic
- NRHP reference No.: 80004480
- Added to NRHP: July 2, 1980

St. Joseph's Roman Catholic Church is a historic church at County Highway Q and Rich Road in Shields, Wisconsin.

== Architecture ==
The church was designed by James Clancy of Hubbleton in the Carpenter Gothic style, and constructed by local craftsmen and parishioners of cream brick and wood. The belfry is louvred with a shingled spire, resting on the gabled roof over the main entrance. A key feature of the nave are ten pointed-arch stained glass windows, added at some time after 1895, each set with a different Christian symbol in the arch and dedicated to a different individual or family. The altar was donated in 1899 and features a triptych back.

== History ==
The village of Richwood and its surrounding area was settled by Irish and German Catholics in the mid-19th century, but the only church serving the community was St. Bernard's in Watertown, almost ten miles away. A Patrick Norton donated an acre of land for the construction of a church, and the cornerstone was laid on July 3, 1864.

In 1952, the Holy Cross Fathers who had been administering the parish were removed, and the parish became a mission of St. Henry's in Watertown, then of St. John's in Clyman. By 1970, reflecting a decline in the rural population, the church was deconsecrated and the Archdiocese of Milwaukee, of which it was then part, sold it and its rectory to private owners. The church was added to the National Register in 1980.
