= Thomas F. Solon =

American politician

Thomas F. Solon (June 30, 1853 – January 8, 1923) was an American businessman and politician.

Born in the town of Shield, Dodge County, Wisconsin, Solon went to public schools. He was in the real estate and carriage business. He was also in the general merchandise business and served as postmaster in the community of Richwood, Dodge county, Wisconsin. He helped start the Posey Creamery. In 1887 and in 1889, Solon served in the Wisconsin State Assembly and was a Democrat. The village, formerly known as White Birch was renamed in his honor. Solon Springs, Douglas County, Wisconsin. He was the first non-native person who discovered several springs. He started the Solon Springs Water Company. Solon also served as postmaster for Superior, Wisconsin. He died in Minneapolis, Minnesota at his son's home.
