= John Solon =

19th century American politician

Member of the Wisconsin State Assembly from the Dodge 6th district
- In office January 1, 1872 – January 1873
- Preceded by: District established
- Succeeded by: Ferdinand Gnewuch

Personal details
- Born: March 11, 1842 County Mayo, Ireland, UK
- Died: June 23, 1921 (aged 79) Juneau, Wisconsin, U.S.
- Party: Democratic

John Solon (March 11, 1842 – June 23, 1921) was an Irish American immigrant, farmer, and Democratic politician. He was a member of the Wisconsin State Assembly, representing southern Dodge County during the 1872 session.

== Biography ==
Solon was born on March 11, 1842, in County Mayo, Ireland. As a child, he emigrated to the United States with his parents and, in 1847, settled in the town of Shields, Dodge County, Wisconsin, where he was raised and educated. In 1862, he had been appointed Town Treasurer of Shields to fill the vacancy caused by the death of his father. Solon was elected to the position the following year. Other positions he held include town chairman (similar to Mayor) of Shields from 1869 to 1870. Solon died at his home in Juneau, Wisconsin, on June 23, 1921.
