= Richwood, Dodge County, Wisconsin =

Richwood, Wisconsin
- Unincorporated community
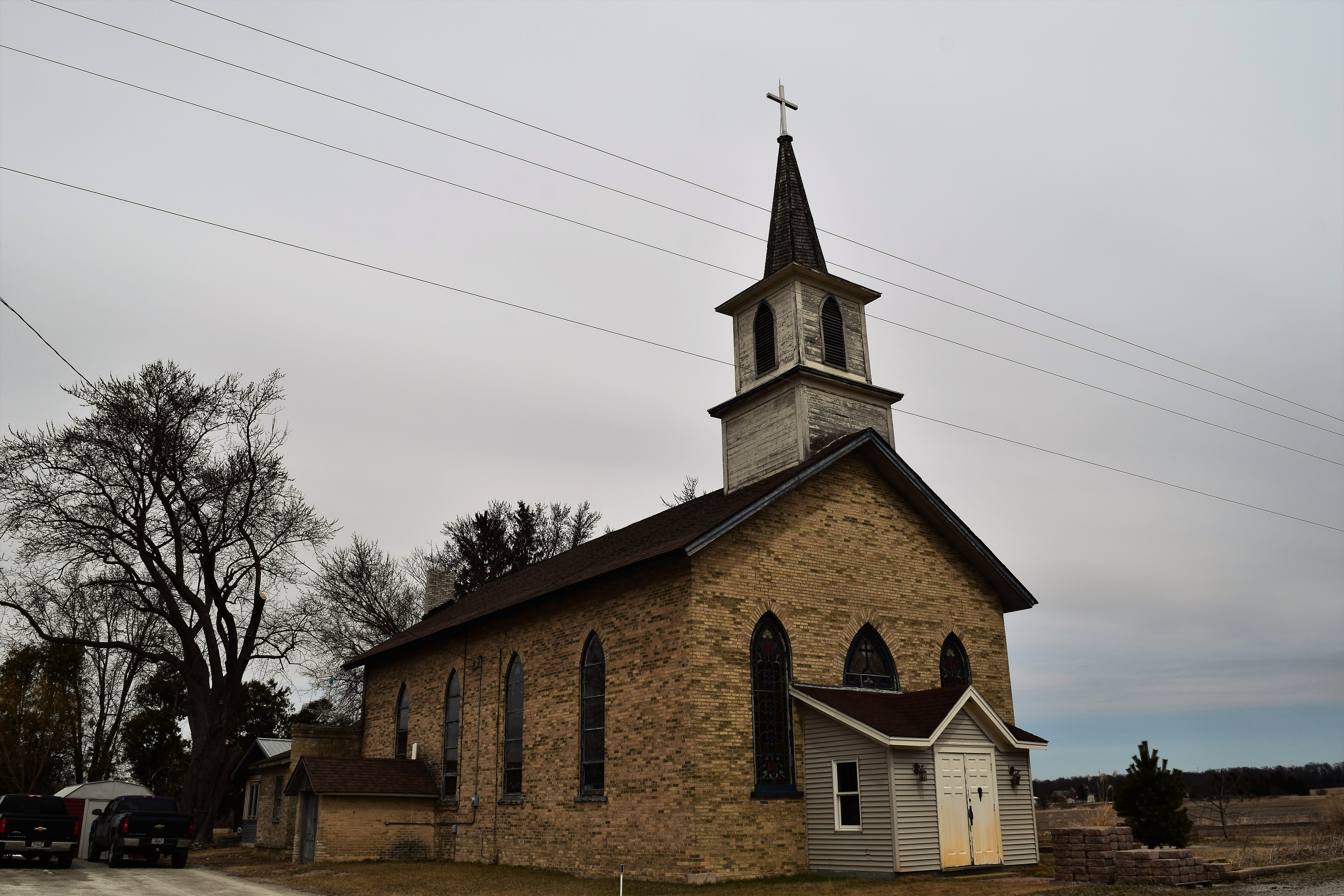
- St. Joseph's Roman Catholic Church in Richwood

- Location within Wisconsin Location within the United States
- Coordinates: 43°14′29″N 88°46′59″W
- Country: United States
- State: Wisconsin
- County: Dodge County
- Town: Shields
- Elevation: 840 ft (260 m)
- Time zone: UTC-6 (Central (CST))
  - Summer (DST): UTC-5 (CDT)
- Area code: 920
- GNIS feature ID: 1572296

Richwood is an unincorporated community in the town of Shields, Dodge County, Wisconsin, United States.
