= Alderley, Wisconsin =

- Unincorporated community
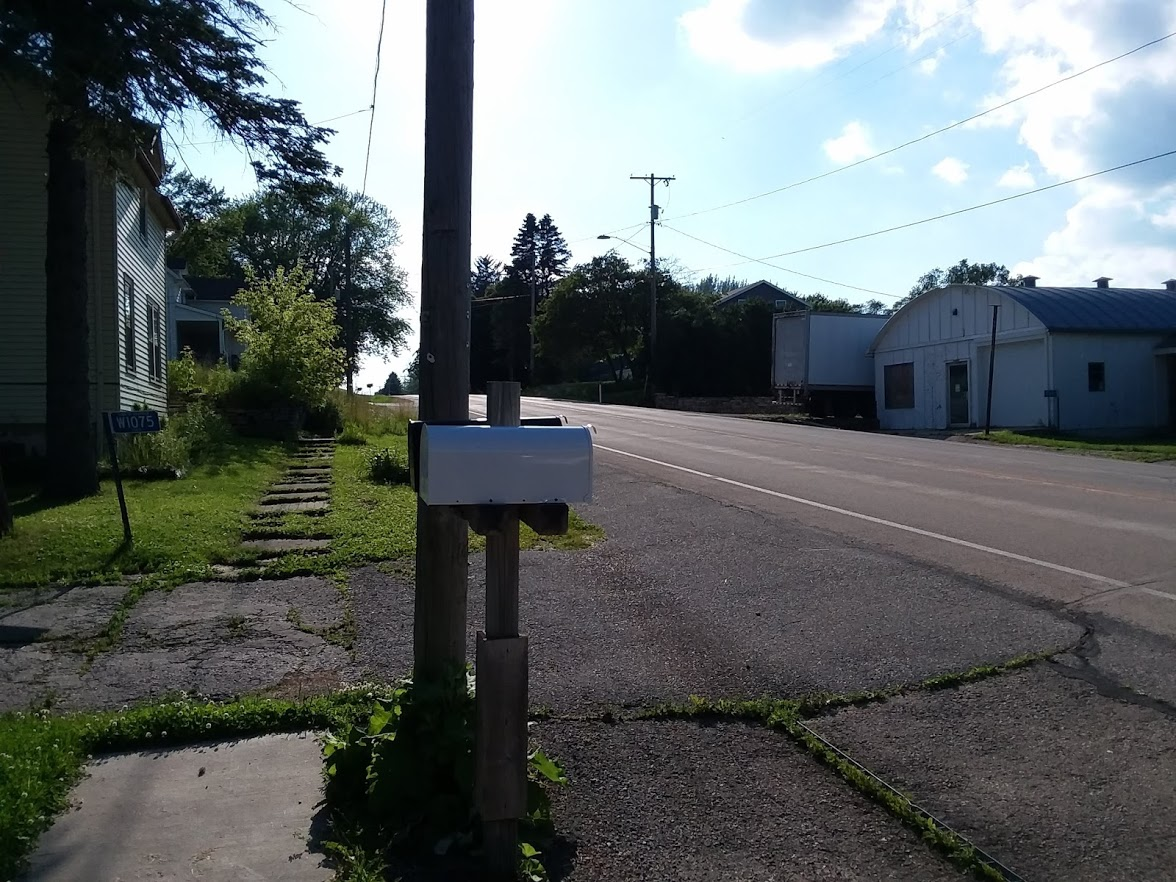
- County Road O is the primary and sole modern-day thoroughfare for the small hamlet.

- Location within Wisconsin Location within the United States
- Coordinates: 43°13′03″N 88°26′59″W
- Country: United States
- State: Wisconsin
- County: Dodge
- Town: Ashippun
- Elevation: 951 ft (290 m)
- Time zone: UTC-6 (Central (CST))
  - Summer (DST): UTC-5 (CDT)
- Area code: 920
- GNIS feature ID: 1560746

Alderley is an unincorporated community located in the town of Ashippun, Dodge County, Wisconsin, United States. Alderley is located on Highway O, approximately 7 miles (11 km) north of Stone Bank, 3 miles (5 km) north of the unincorporated community of Mapleton, and 3 miles (5 km) east of Ashippun. The community was named by early settlers for Alderley Edge, England.
