= Solon (given name) =

Solon is a masculine given name which may refer to:

- Solon (c. 630–c. 560 BC), Athenian statesman, lawmaker and poet
- Solon Irving Bailey (1854–1931), American astronomer
- Solon Barnett (1921–1998), American football player
- Solon Spencer Beman (1853–1914), American architect
- Solon Bixler (born 1977), American indie rock musician and singer
- Solon Borglum (1868–1922), American sculptor
- Solon Borland (1808–1864), United States senator and physician
- Solon J. Buck (1884–1962), Second Archivist of the United States
- Solon Chase (1823–1909), American farmer, orchardist, politician and newspaper publisher
- Solon Gikas (1898–1978), Greek Army lieutenant general, Chief of the Hellenic Army General Staff and government minister
- Solon Toothaker Kimball (1909–1982), American educator and anthropologist
- Solon Ménos (1859–1918), Haitian author and politician
- Solon Michaelides (1905–1979), Cypriot composer, teacher and musicologist
- Solon D. Neal (1846–1920), American soldier awarded the Medal of Honor
- Solon Peppas (born 1974), Greek former tennis player
- Solon Robinson (1803–1880), American writer, journalist and agriculturist
