= Old Lebanon, Wisconsin =

- Unincorporated community
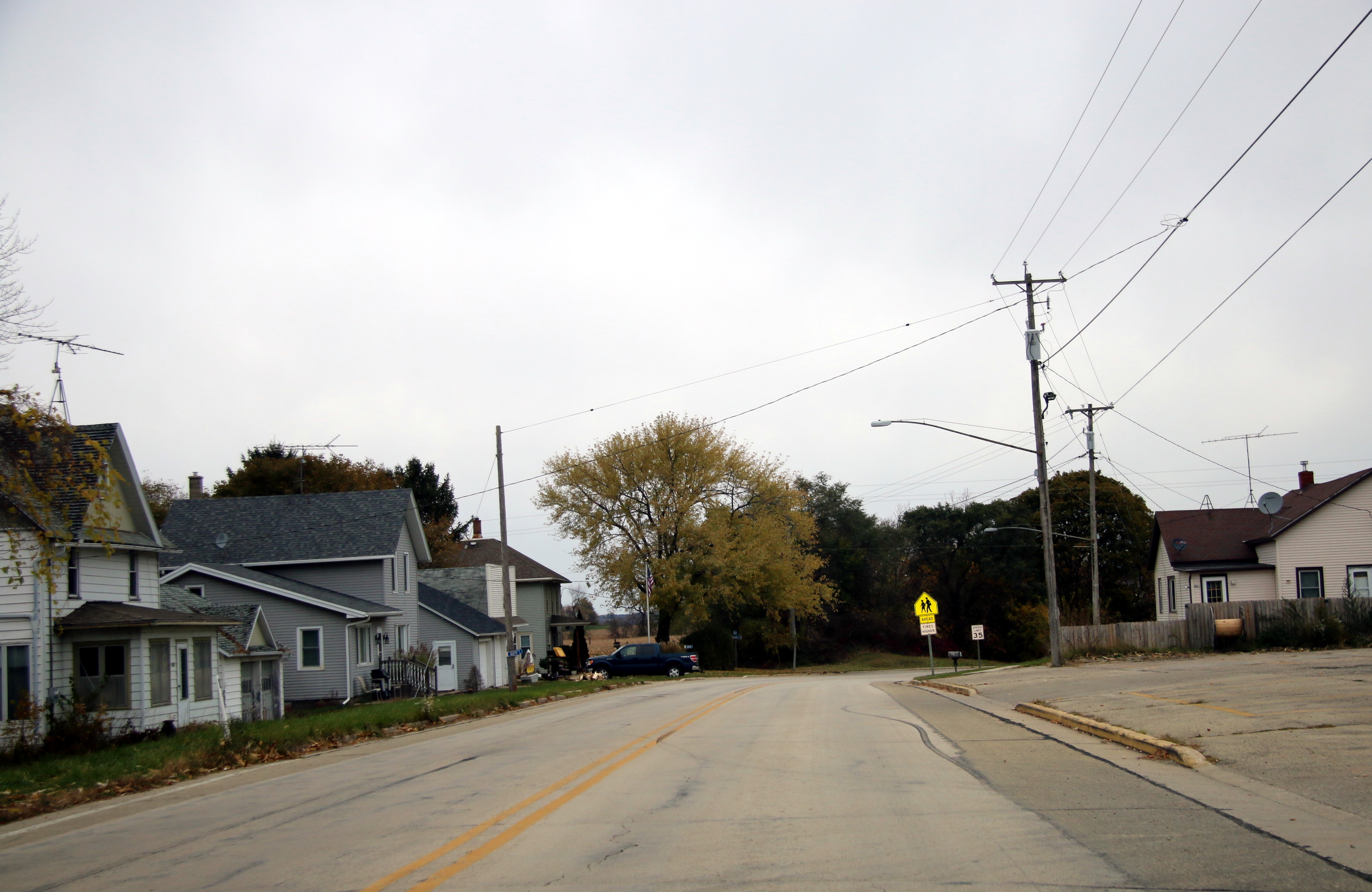
- Housing in Old Lebanon

- Location within Wisconsin Location within the United States
- Coordinates: 43°13′34″N 88°37′49″W
- Country: United States
- State: Wisconsin
- County: Dodge County
- Town: Lebanon
- Elevation: 912 ft (278 m)
- Time zone: UTC-6 (Central (CST))
  - Summer (DST): UTC-5 (CDT)
- Area code: 920
- GNIS feature ID: 1570779

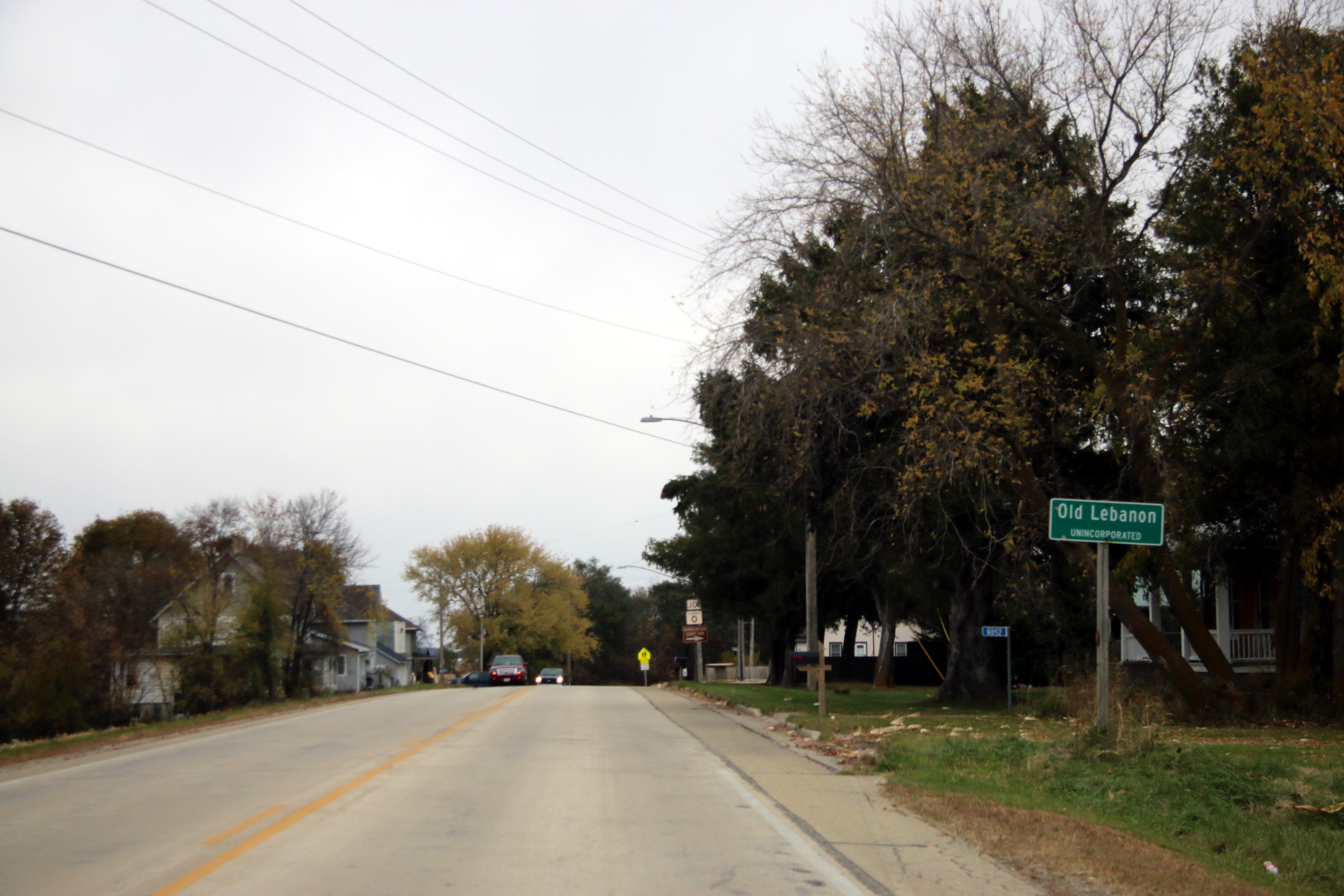
Sign for Old Lebanon

Old Lebanon is an unincorporated community located in the town of Lebanon, Dodge County, Wisconsin, United States. It is home to the world's largest cheese curd.
