= Sugar Island, Wisconsin =

- Unincorporated community
- Nickname: Sugar Island
- Location within Wisconsin Location within the United States
- Coordinates: 43°13′33″N 88°34′47″W
- Country: United States
- State: Wisconsin
- County: Dodge County
- Town of Lebanon: 1837
- Elevation: 899 ft (274 m)
- Time zone: UTC-6 (Central (CST))
  - Summer (DST): UTC-5 (CDT)
- Area code: 920
- GNIS feature ID: 1575026

Sugar Island is an unincorporated community in the Village of Lebanon, Dodge County, Wisconsin, United States. It is located on County Trunk Highway O, west of Highway 67, 10 miles east of Watertown and five miles east of County Trunk Highway R in Lebanon.

== History ==
The name was originally Sinsibakwado-Minissing, which is Ojibwe for at, to, or from Sugar Island. The name was given to the area by the Ojibwe tribe, because the maple trees would have sugary sap that they would collect once a year.
