= Hans H. Olson =

American politician

Hans Olson

Member of the Wisconsin State Assembly
- In office 1896–1898

Personal details
- Born: July 23, 1847 Skien, Norway
- Died: 1912 (aged 64–65)
- Party: Republican

Hans H. Olson (July 23, 1847 – 1912) was a Norwegian-born American politician who served as a member of the Wisconsin State Assembly from 1896 to 1898.

== Background ==
Olson was born on July 23, 1847, near Skien, Norway. In June 1857, he moved to Ashippun, Wisconsin before moving to Waushara County, Wisconsin in 1861 and to Berlin, Wisconsin in 1880. Olson worked in lumbering, school teaching and hotel keeping.

Olson represented Green Lake County, Wisconsin in the Wisconsin Assembly during the 1897 session. Olson also served as the clerk of the Berlin, Wisconsin board of education from 1890 to 1893. Olson was a member of the Republican Party of Wisconsin.
