= Lebanon (CDP), Wisconsin =

Census-designated place in Wisconsin, United States

Lebanon, Wisconsin
- Census-designated place
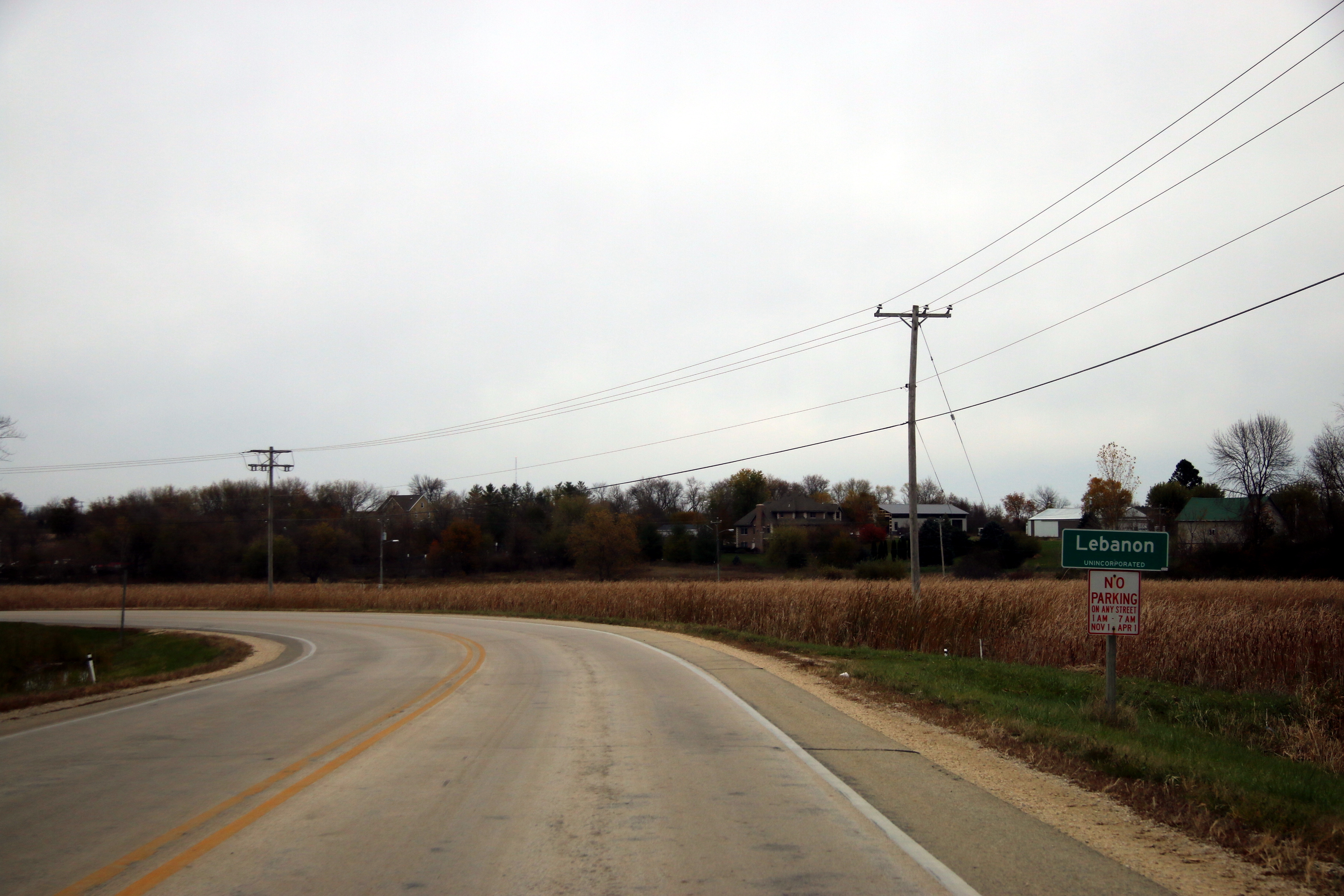
- Sign for Lebanon

- Location within Wisconsin
- Coordinates: 43°15′19″N 88°37′36″W
- Country: United States
- State: Wisconsin
- County: Dodge
- Town: Lebanon

Area
  - Total: 0.441 sq mi (1.14 km^{2})
  - Land: 0.441 sq mi (1.14 km^{2})
  - Water: 0 sq mi (0 km^{2})
- Elevation: 899 ft (274 m)

Population (2010)
  - Total: 204
  - Density: 463/sq mi (179/km^{2})
- Time zone: UTC-6 (Central (CST))
  - Summer (DST): UTC-5 (CDT)
- ZIP code: 53047
- Area code: 920
- GNIS feature ID: 1567918

Lebanon is an unincorporated census-designated place located in the town of Lebanon, Dodge County, Wisconsin, United States. Lebanon is 6.5 miles (10.5 km) northeast of Watertown. Lebanon has a post office with ZIP code 53047. As of the 2010 census, its population was 204.

== Images ==
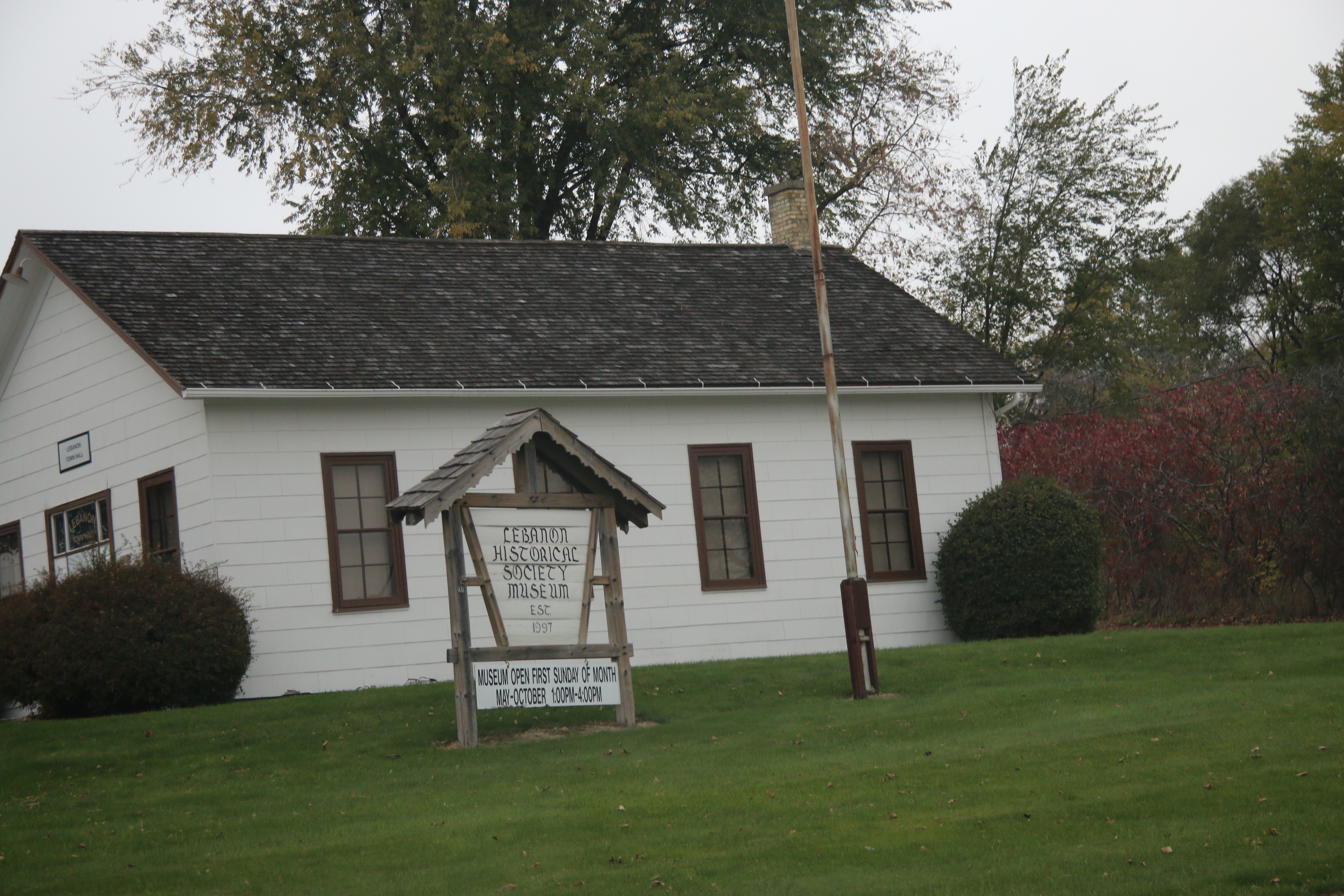
Lebanon Historical Museum

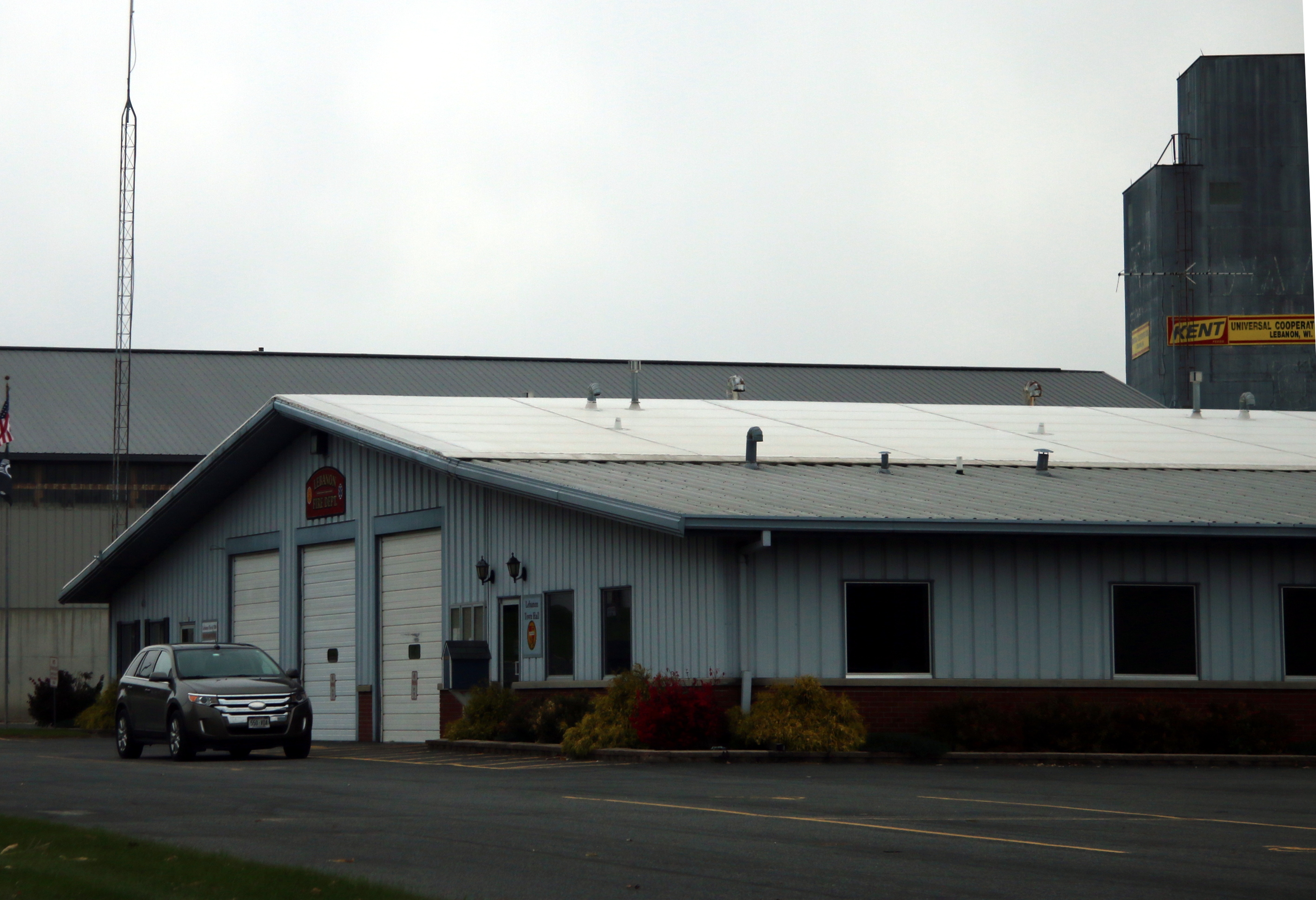
Fire Department
