= Juneau, Wisconsin =

- City
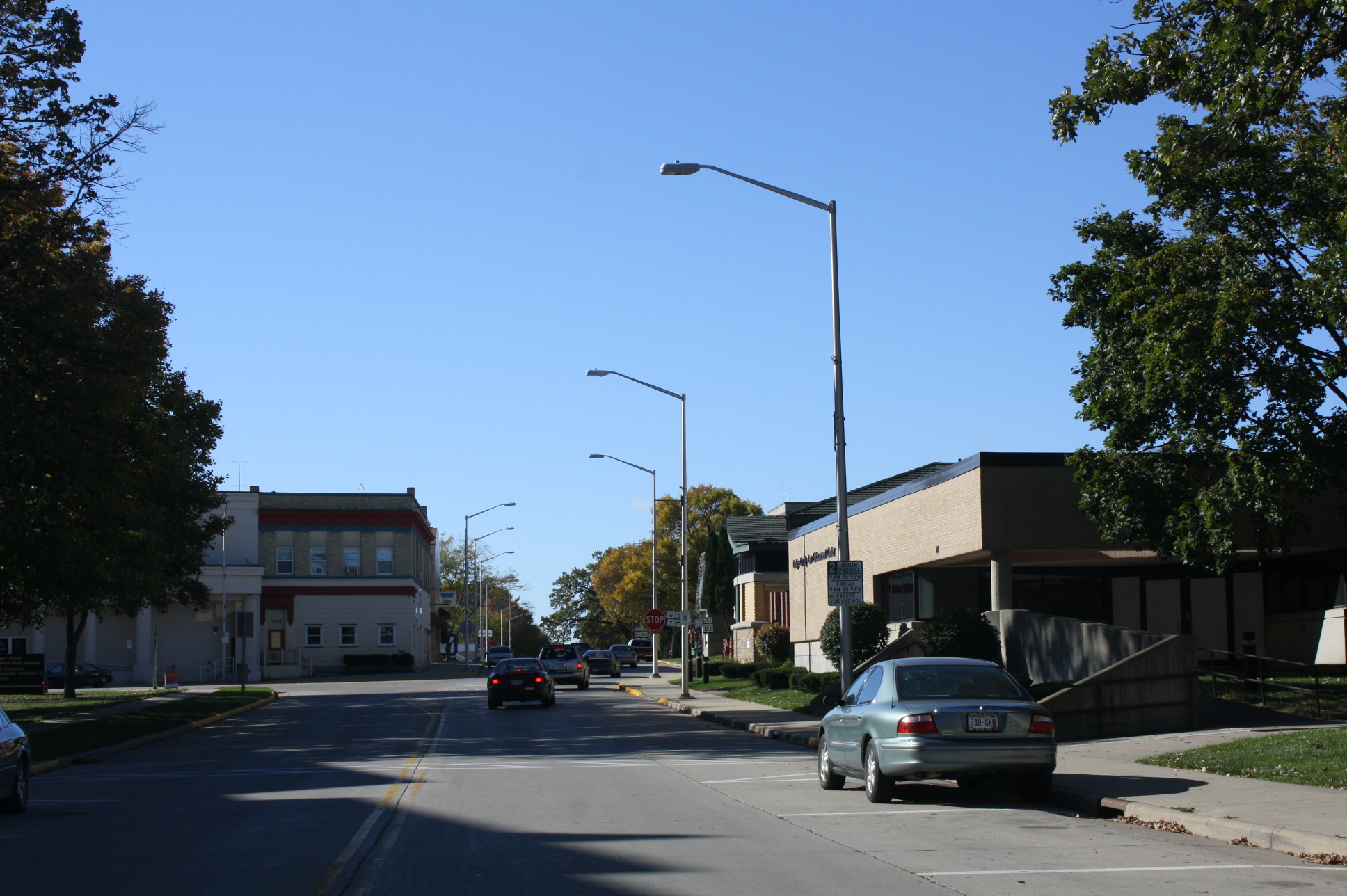
- Downtown Juneau

- Location of Juneau in Dodge County, Wisconsin.

- Location within Wisconsin Location within the United States
- Coordinates: 43°24′23″N 88°42′12″W
- Country: United States
- State: Wisconsin
- County: Dodge

Area
  - Total: 1.65 sq mi (4.27 km^{2})
  - Land: 1.65 sq mi (4.27 km^{2})
  - Water: 0 sq mi (0.00 km^{2})
- Elevation: 925 ft (282 m)

Population (2020)
  - Total: 2,658
  - Density: 1,612/sq mi (622.5/km^{2})
- Time zone: UTC-6 (Central (CST))
  - Summer (DST): UTC-5 (CDT)
- ZIP Code: 53039
- Area code: 920
- FIPS code: 55-38675
- GNIS feature ID: 1567322
- Website: cityofjuneau.net

Juneau is a city in Dodge County, Wisconsin, United States. The population was 2,658 at the 2020 census. It is the county seat of Dodge County.

== History ==
Juneau was founded in 1845 by settlers Martin Rich and William Dennis. It became the county seat of Dodge County in 1846. The founders originally named the settlement "Victory" and then "Dodge Center", from the German "Deutsch Center", but finding these names in conflict with other places, the town changed its name to Juneau in 1852. Most sources say that Juneau was named after French-Canadian trader Solomon Juneau, the founder of Milwaukee and of Theresa, Wisconsin. The city itself claims to be named for Paul Juneau, Solomon Juneau's part-Menominee son, a businessman and state legislator who made his home in the city and served as county register of deeds until his accidental shooting death outside the courthouse in Juneau in 1858. Juneau was incorporated as a village in 1865 and a city in 1879.

== Geography ==
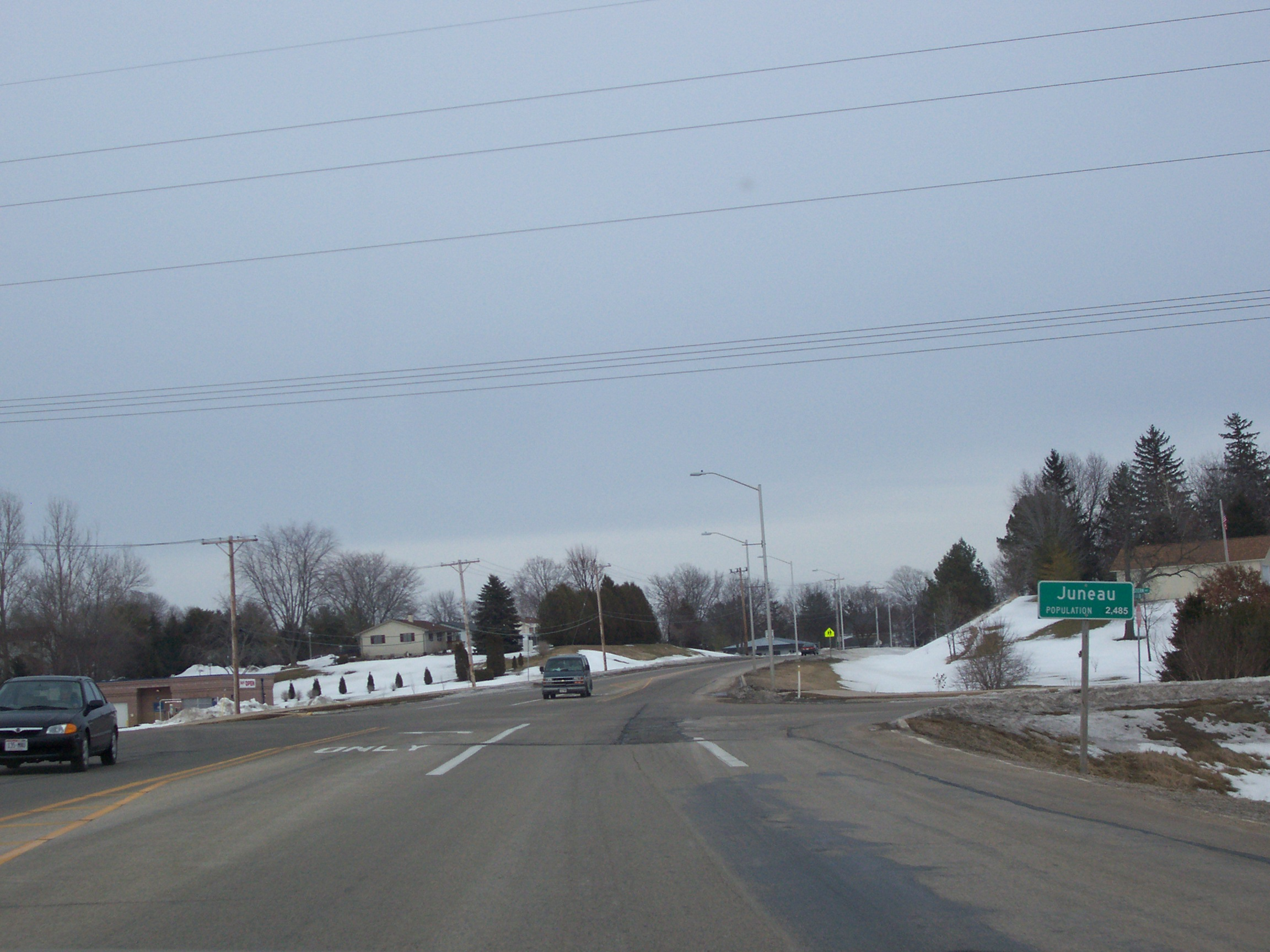
Population sign on Wisconsin Highway 26

Juneau is located at 43°24′23″N 88°42′12″W (43.406251, -88.703399).

According to the United States Census Bureau, the city has a total area of 1.65 square miles (4.27 km^{2}), all land.

== Demographics ==
Historical population
Census	Pop.	Note	%±
1870	300		—
1880	454		51.3%
1890	701		54.4%
1900	891		27.1%
1910	1,003		12.6%
1920	1,159		15.6%
1930	1,154		−0.4%
1940	1,301		12.7%
1950	1,444		11.0%
1960	1,718		19.0%
1970	2,043		18.9%
1980	2,045		0.1%
1990	2,157		5.5%
2000	2,485		15.2%
2010	2,814		13.2%
2020	2,658		−5.5%
U.S. Decennial Census

=== 2020 census ===
As of the census of 2020, the population was 2,658. The population density was 1,611.9 inhabitants per square mile (622.4/km^{2}). There were 926 housing units at an average density of 561.6 per square mile (216.8/km^{2}). The racial makeup of the city was 87.5% White, 2.4% Black or African American, 0.4% Native American, 0.2% Asian, 5.8% from other races, and 3.6% from two or more races. Ethnically, the population was 9.0% Hispanic or Latino of any race.

=== 2010 census ===
As of the census of 2010, there were 2,814 people, 852 households, and 561 families living in the city. The population density was 1,675.0 inhabitants per square mile (646.7/km^{2}). There were 924 housing units at an average density of 550.0 per square mile (212.4/km^{2}). The racial makeup of the city was 93.2% White, 3.6% African American, 0.4% Native American, 0.9% Asian, 1.4% from other races, and 0.5% from two or more races. Hispanic or Latino of any race were 10.1% of the population.

There were 852 households, of which 34.9% had children under the age of 18 living with them, 51.1% were married couples living together, 9.6% had a female householder with no husband present, 5.2% had a male householder with no wife present, and 34.2% were non-families. 29.8% of all households were made up of individuals, and 11.3% had someone living alone who was 65 years of age or older. The average household size was 2.46 and the average family size was 3.03.

The median age in the city was 38 years. 19.9% of residents were under the age of 18; 9.5% were between the ages of 18 and 24; 31.1% were from 25 to 44; 25.3% were from 45 to 64; and 14.2% were 65 years of age or older. The gender makeup of the city was 56.1% male and 43.9% female.

=== 2000 census ===
As of the census of 2000, there were 2,485 people, 818 households, and 554 families living in the city. The population density was 1,602.5 people per square mile (619.0/km^{2}). There were 863 housing units at an average density of 556.5 per square mile (215.0/km^{2}). The racial makeup of the city was 97.99% White, 0.32% African American, 0.16% Native American, 1.13% from other races, and 0.40% from two or more races. Hispanic or Latino of any race were 2.54% of the population.

There were 818 households, out of which 33.3% had children under the age of 18 living with them, 56.4% were married couples living together, 7.3% had a female householder with no husband present, and 32.2% were non-families. 26.9% of all households were made up of individuals, and 12.7% had someone living alone who was 65 years of age or older. The average household size was 2.46 and the average family size was 2.99.

In the city, the population was spread out, with 20.9% under the age of 18, 8.9% from 18 to 24, 28.5% from 25 to 44, 21.0% from 45 to 64, and 20.7% who were 65 years of age or older. The median age was 40 years. For every 100 females, there were 99.9 males. For every 100 females age 18 and over, there were 99.9 males.

The median income for a household in the city was $42,162, and the median income for a family was $50,263. Males had a median income of $33,708 versus $24,783 for females. The per capita income for the city was $17,286. About 3.5% of families and 5.9% of the population were below the poverty line, including 5.2% of those under age 18 and 7.5% of those age 65 or over.

== Education ==
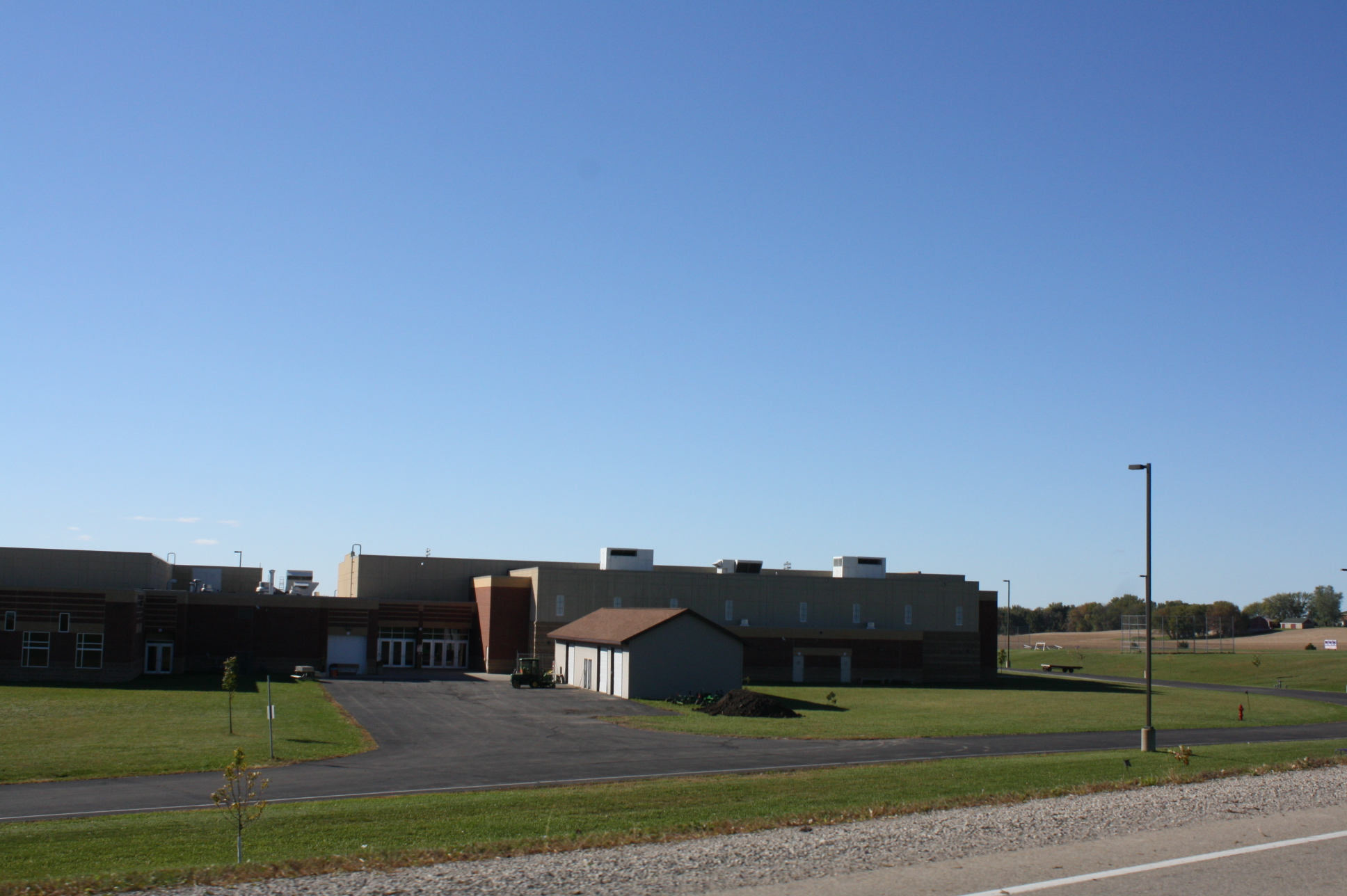
Dodgeland High School

Dodgeland High School is the area's public high school. The school is part of the Dodgeland School District. St. Johns Lutheran School serves students through grade 8.

== Transportation ==
Wisconsin Highway 26 runs through the city's downtown area.

General aviation in the area is served by the Dodge County Airport (KUNU), located just north of Juneau.

Juneau was served by the Chicago & North Western line between Janesville and Fond Du Lac. It was eventually abandoned south of Fort Atkinson and North of Clyman.

== Notable people ==
- Hiram Barber, Jr., U.S. Representative from Illinois
- Byron Buffington, Wisconsin State Assemblyman
- Jesse A. Canniff, Wisconsin State Assemblyman
- Eugene A. Clifford, Wisconsin State Senator
- John W. DeGroff, Wisconsin State Senator
- Robert Goetsch, Wisconsin State Assemblyman
- Eli Hawks, Wisconsin State Assemblyman and mayor of Juneau
- Addie Joss, baseball Hall of Fame pitcher who grew up in Juneau
- Martin L. Lueck, politician and judge
