= Shields, Dodge County, Wisconsin =

Shields, Wisconsin
- Town
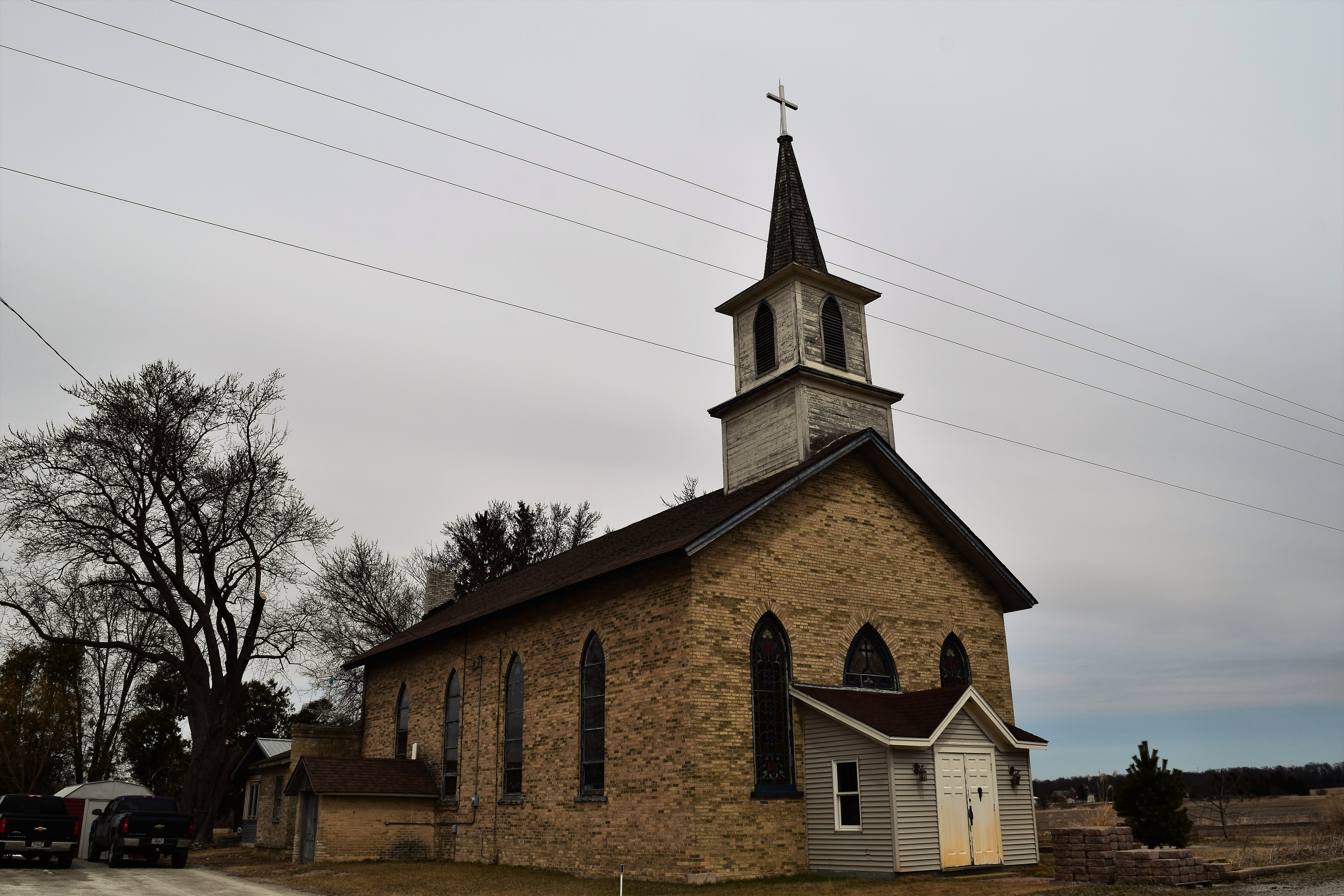
- St. Joseph's Roman Catholic Church

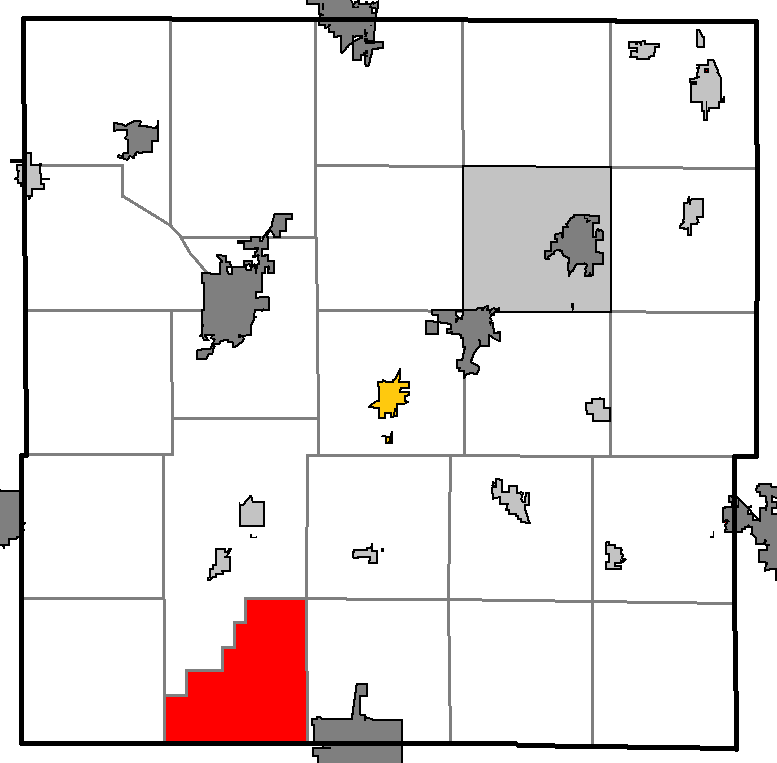
- Location of Shields, within Dodge County
- Coordinates: 43°14′3″N 88°49′2″W
- Country: United States
- State: Wisconsin
- County: Dodge

Area
  - Total: 26.9 sq mi (69.8 km^{2})
  - Land: 26.5 sq mi (68.7 km^{2})
  - Water: 0.46 sq mi (1.2 km^{2})
- Elevation: 814 ft (248 m)

Population (2020)
  - Total: 503
  - Density: 19.0/sq mi (7.32/km^{2})
- Time zone: UTC-6 (Central (CST))
  - Summer (DST): UTC-5 (CDT)
- FIPS code: 55-73575
- GNIS feature ID: 1584152
- Website: http://townofshields.com/

Shields is a town in Dodge County, Wisconsin, United States. The population was 503 at the 2020 census. The unincorporated community of Richwood is located in the town.

== History ==
The town was named after James Shields, a general during the Mexican War and a United States senator who represented the states of Illinois, Minnesota, and Missouri.

== Geography ==
According to the United States Census Bureau, the town has a total area of 27 square miles (69.8 km^{2}), of which 26.5 square miles (68.7 km^{2}) is land and 0.4 square mile (1.2 km^{2}) (1.67%) is water.

== Demographics ==
As of the census of 2000, there were 554 people, 198 households, and 158 families living in the town. The population density was 20.9 people per square mile (8.1/km^{2}). There were 203 housing units at an average density of 7.7 per square mile (3/km^{2}). The racial makeup of the town was 99.46% White, 0.18% African American, 0.18% Native American, and 0.18% from two or more races. Hispanic or Latino people of any race were 0.90% of the population.

There were 198 households, out of which 35.4% had children under the age of 18 living with them, 68.2% were married couples living together, 3.5% had a female householder with no husband present, and 20.2% were non-families. 18.2% of all households were made up of individuals, and 6.6% had someone living alone who was 65 years of age or older. The average household size was 2.80 and the average family size was 3.16.

In the town, the population was spread out, with 28% under the age of 18, 6.3% from 18 to 24, 26.9% from 25 to 44, 28.7% from 45 to 64, and 10.1% who were 65 years of age or older. The median age was 39 years. For every 100 females, there were 113.9 males. For every 100 females age 18 and over, there were 118 males.

The median income for a household in the town was $50,000, and the median income for a family was $55,375. Males had a median income of $37,109 versus $25,000 for females. The per capita income for the town was $21,218. About 1.2% of families and 1.6% of the population were below the poverty line, including none of those under the age of 18 or those 65 or over.

== Notable people ==
- Patrick Griffin, Irish-born Wisconsin legislator, lived in the town
- James Higgins, Irish-born farmer and Wisconsin Reform Party legislator, lived in the town
- George G. King, farmer and state legislator, lived in the town
- John Solon, Irish-born Wisconsin farmer and legislator, lived in the town
- Thomas F. Solon, businessman and Wisconsin legislator, born in the town
- Herman A. Ziemer, farmer and politician, lived in the town
