= Ashippun, Wisconsin =

Town of Ashippun, Wisconsin
- Town
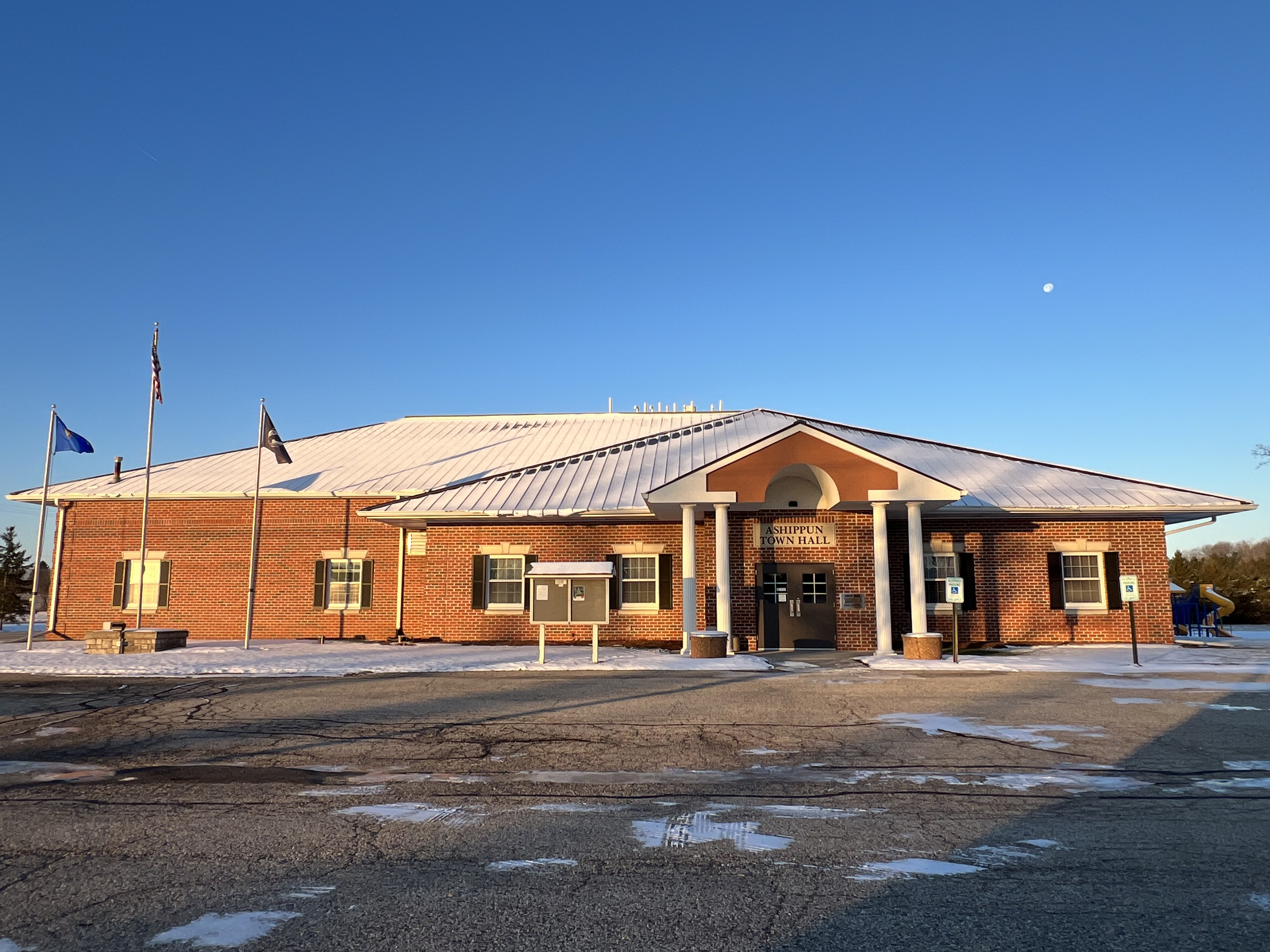
- Town hall

- Flag

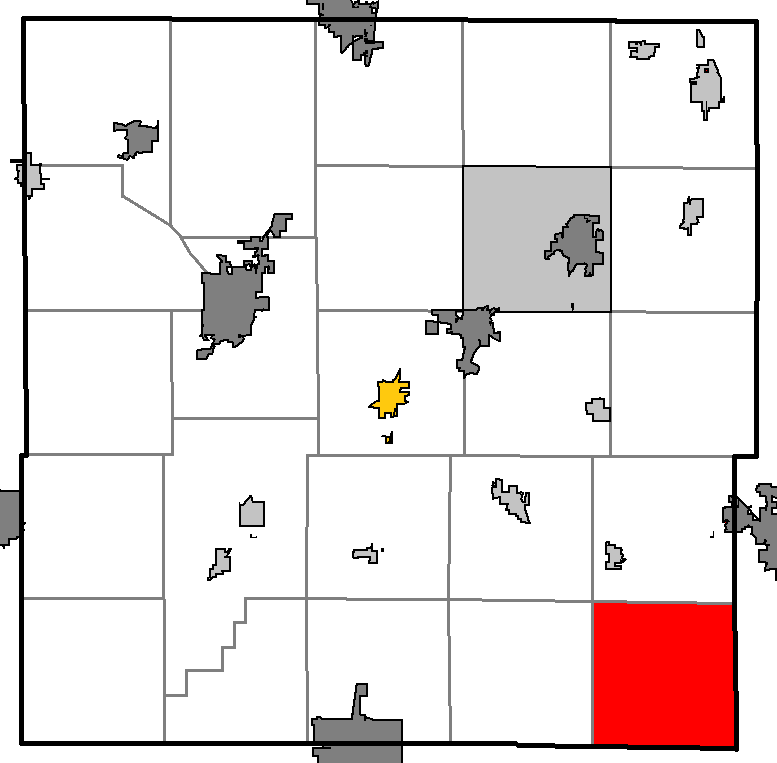
- Location of the Town of Ashippun, within Dodge County
- Coordinates: 43°14′43″N 88°29′17″W
- Country: United States
- State: Wisconsin
- County: Dodge

Government
  - Chairman: Steve Panozzo
  - Supervisors: William Bremmer; James Meyer; Ryan Jacobs; Norman Greeb

Area
  - Total: 35.7 sq mi (92.5 km^{2})
  - Land: 35.6 sq mi (92.3 km^{2})
  - Water: 0.077 sq mi (0.2 km^{2})
- Elevation: 909 ft (277 m)

Population (2020)
  - Total: 2,663
  - Density: 74.7/sq mi (28.9/km^{2})
- Time zone: UTC-6 (Central (CST))
  - Summer (DST): UTC-5 (CDT)
- FIPS code: 55-03200
- GNIS feature ID: 1582722

Ashippun is a town in Dodge County, Wisconsin, United States. The unincorporated communities of Alderley, Ashippun, and Old Ashippun are located in the town. The population was 2,663 at the 2020 census.

== Name origin ==
The name Ashippun is of Ojibwe origin. It is derived from ajiopan "decayed lungs". Another theory derives the name from the Indian word for "raccoon", which is what the Indians called the river flowing through the eastern part of the town. The Menominee name of the village, Ǣhsepan, reflects that meaning. The Ojibway name meaning raccoon, is Esiban.

== Geography ==
According to the United States Census Bureau, the town has a total area of 35.7 square miles (92.5 km^{2}), of which 35.6 square miles (92.3 km^{2}) is land and 0.1 square mile (0.2 km^{2}) of it (0.25%) is water.

== Demographics ==
As of the census of 2000, there were 2,308 people, 845 households, and 670 families residing in the town. The population density was 64.8 people per square mile (25.0/km^{2}). There were 880 housing units at an average density of 24.7 per square mile (9.5/km^{2}). The racial makeup of the town was 97.75% White, 0.13% Native American, 0.56% Asian, 0.13% Pacific Islander, 0.43% from other races, and 1.00% from two or more races. Hispanic or Latino people of any race were 1.13% of the population.

There were 845 households, out of which 36.1% had children under the age of 18 living with them, 71.6% were married couples living together, 4.5% had a female householder with no husband present, and 20.6% were non-families. 15.1% of all households were made up of individuals, and 5.4% had someone living alone who was 65 years of age or older. The average household size was 2.73 and the average family size was 3.05.

In the town, the population was spread out, with 25.6% under the age of 18, 6.5% from 18 to 24, 32.1% from 25 to 44, 25.6% from 45 to 64, and 10.2% who were 65 years of age or older. The median age was 37 years. For every 100 females, there were 107.4 males. For every 100 females age 18 and over, there were 110.6 males.

The median income for a household in the town was $55,982, and the median income for a family was $60,347. Males had a median income of $37,363 versus $24,559 for females. The per capita income for the town was $22,698. About 1.6% of families and 2.1% of the population were below the poverty line, including 1.2% of those under age 18 and 3.2% of those age 65 or over.

== Education ==
Ashippun is within the Oconomowoc Area School District. The public high school is Oconomowoc High School.

== Tourist attractions ==
Ashippun is the home of Honey of a Museum, or Honey Acres, a museum of beekeeping established in 1852.

== Notable people ==
- Hans H. Olson (1847–1912), Wisconsin state representative
- Theodora W. Youmans (1863–1932), journalist, writer, and women's suffrage activist, born in Ashippun
