= Lebanon, Dodge County, Wisconsin =

Lebanon, Wisconsin
- Town
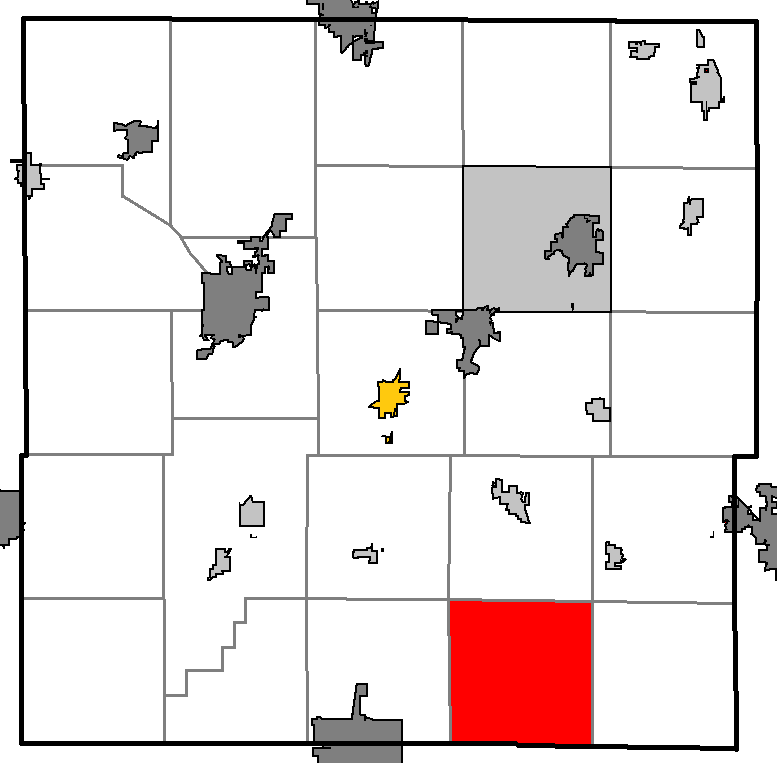
- Location of Lebanon, within Dodge County
- Coordinates: 43°14′27″N 88°35′22″W
- Country: United States
- State: Wisconsin
- County: Dodge

Area
  - Total: 36.0 sq mi (93.3 km^{2})
  - Land: 35.8 sq mi (92.8 km^{2})
  - Water: 0.19 sq mi (0.5 km^{2})
- Elevation: 846 ft (258 m)

Population (2020)
  - Total: 1,587
  - Density: 44.3/sq mi (17.1/km^{2})
- Time zone: UTC-6 (Central (CST))
  - Summer (DST): UTC-5 (CDT)
- FIPS code: 55-43050
- GNIS feature ID: 1583536
- Website: https://lebanondodgewi.gov/

Lebanon is a town in Dodge County, Wisconsin, United States. The population was 1,587 at the 2020 census. The census-designated place of Lebanon is located in the town, as are the unincorporated communities of Old Lebanon and Sugar Island.

== History ==
The first settlers were part of the Old Lutheran migration from Prussia in 1843. Johann Schley, a master tailor who was one of the settlers, proposed the name Lebanon ("Libanon" in German) for their community "because it dwelt on the hillside and looked down on the tamarack trees, which bore a resemblance to the cedars that grew on Lebanon's mountains".

== Geography ==
According to the United States Census Bureau, the town has a total area of 36.0 square miles (93.3 km^{2}), of which 35.8 square miles (92.8 km^{2}) is land and 0.2 square mile (0.5 km^{2}) (0.53%) is water.

== Demographics ==
As of the census of 2000, there were 1,664 people, 610 households, and 473 families residing in the town. The population density was 46.5 people per square mile (17.9/km^{2}). There were 631 housing units at an average density of 17.6 per square mile (6.8/km^{2}). The racial makeup of the town was 98.56% White, 0.24% African American, 0.36% Native American, 0.06% Asian, 0.42% from other races, and 0.36% from two or more races. Hispanic or Latino of any race were 0.72% of the population.

There were 610 households, out of which 33.1% had children under the age of 18 living with them, 68.9% were married couples living together, 5.4% had a female householder with no husband present, and 22.3% were non-families. 18.4% of all households were made up of individuals, and 7.0% had someone living alone who was 65 years of age or older. The average household size was 2.73 and the average family size was 3.12.

In the town, the population was spread out, with 26.2% under the age of 18, 6.1% from 18 to 24, 29.0% from 25 to 44, 24.4% from 45 to 64, and 14.4% who were 65 years of age or older. The median age was 38 years. For every 100 females, there were 102.4 males. For every 100 females age 18 and over, there were 100.7 males.

The median income for a household in the town was $45,897, and the median income for a family was $50,250. Males had a median income of $32,458 versus $24,306 for females. The per capita income for the town was $19,063. About 3.3% of families and 5.6% of the population were below the poverty line, including 11.3% of those under the age of 18 and 3.3% of those 65 and older.

== Organizations ==
- Lebanon Volunteer Fire Department
- Lebanon Luckies 4-H Club
- St. Peters Lutheran Church (LCMS)
- Immanuel Lutheran Church (NALC)
- Lebanon Lutheran School
- Lebanon Elementary Public School (LEAP Elementary)
- Lebanon Band
- Lebanon Historical Society
- Lebanon Youth Baseball

== Notable people ==
- Henry R. Moldenhauer, businessman and farmer, was born in the town
- Herman A. Ziemer, farmer and politician, was born in the town
