= 1855 United States Senate election in Wisconsin =

- January 30, 1855 – February 1, 1855
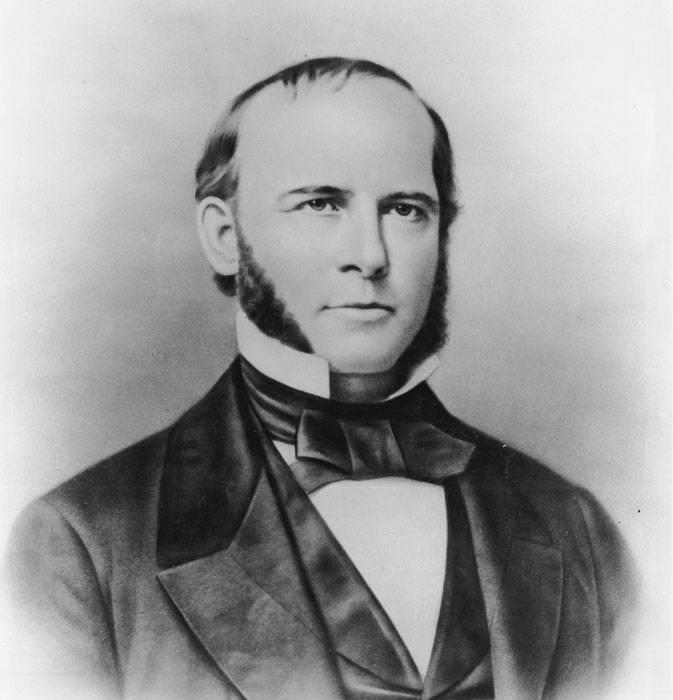

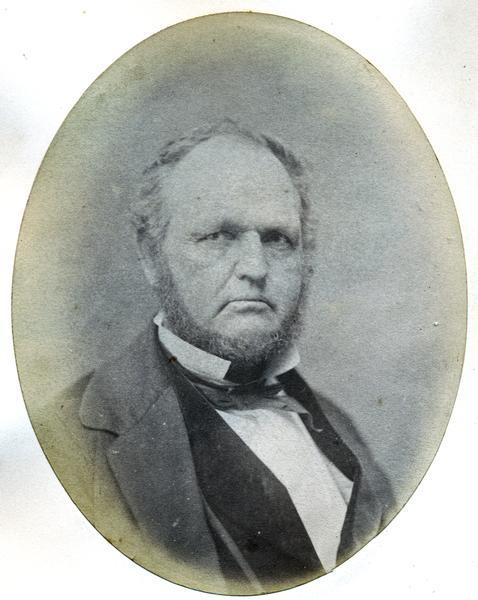
Nominee	Charles Durkee	Byron Kilbourn	Others
Party	Republican	Democratic
Legislative vote	54	39	14
Percentage	50.47%	36.45%	13.08%
U.S. senator before election
Isaac P. Walker
Democratic
Elected U.S. Senator
Charles Durkee
Republican

The 1855 United States Senate election in Wisconsin was held in the 8th Wisconsin Legislature between January 30, 1855, and February 1, 1855. Incumbent Democratic U.S. senator Isaac P. Walker did not run for re-election. Former U.S. representative Charles Durkee was elected United States senator on the eighth ballot, and became the first Republican U.S. senator from Wisconsin.

This was the first U.S. Senate election in Wisconsin after the creation of the Republican Party. Republicans held a majority in the Wisconsin State Assembly, with 44 of 82 seats; Democrats held a narrow majority in the Wisconsin Senate, with 13 of 25 seats. As the Republican Party was a new creation, party loyalties were still in flux, with several members of the legislature not officially aligned with either major party.

With 44 seats in the Assembly and 11 seats in the Senate, Republicans technically held a bare majority of the total legislator votes, but they struggled for three days to unify behind their candidate. Durkee ultimately received 53 of the 55 votes of Republican legislators. The two holdouts who did not vote for Durkee were representatives Joseph Schrage of Sheboygan County and Mitchell L. Delaney of Washington County. To secure the necessary 54 votes, Durkee won the vote of independent (later Republican) Alexander Randall.

== Major candidates ==
=== Democratic ===
- Byron Kilbourn, one of the founders of Milwaukee and a former mayor of the city.
- Harrison Carroll Hobart, former state senator and former speaker of the state Assembly.
- Morgan Lewis Martin, state representative and former delegate to the U.S. House of Representatives from the Wisconsin Territory.

=== Republican ===
- Charles Durkee, former U.S. representative for Wisconsin's 1st congressional district.
- James Duane Doty, former governor of the Wisconsin Territory, former U.S. representative for Wisconsin's 3rd congressional district.

== Results ==
=== Votes on January 30, 1855 ===
The legislature met in joint session on January 30 and took three votes in succession to try to pick a U.S. senator.

1st Vote of the 8th Wisconsin Legislature, January 30, 1855
Party	Candidate	Votes	%	±%
Republican	Charles Durkee	50	47.62%	
Democratic	Byron Kilbourn	18	17.14%	
Republican	James Duane Doty	10	9.52%	
Democratic	Harrison Carroll Hobart	5	4.76%	
Democratic	Edward G. Ryan	5	4.76%	
Democratic	Morgan Lewis Martin	3	2.86%	
Republican	Edward D. Holton	2	1.90%	
Republican	James T. Lewis	2	1.90%	
Democratic	William Pitt Lynde	2	1.90%	
Republican	Marshall Strong	2	1.90%	
	Henry S. Baird	1	0.95%	
	John A. Brown	1	0.95%	
Democratic	Stephen A. Douglas	1	0.95%	
Democratic	Abram D. Smith	1	0.95%	
	John Y. Smith	1	0.95%	
	Frank H. Waite	1	0.95%	
	Absent or not voting	2		
Majority		53	50.48%	
Total votes		105	98.13%	
Void election result

2nd Vote of the 8th Wisconsin Legislature, January 30, 1855
Party	Candidate	Votes	%	±%
Republican	Charles Durkee	49	46.67%	−1
Democratic	Byron Kilbourn	22	20.95%	+4
Republican	James Duane Doty	9	8.57%	−1
Democratic	Harrison Carroll Hobart	6	5.71%	+1
Democratic	Edward G. Ryan	3	2.86%	−2
Democratic	David Agry	2	1.90%	+2
Republican	Edward D. Holton	2	1.90%	
	John H. Lathrop	2	1.90%	+2
Democratic	Morgan Lewis Martin	2	1.90%	−1
Republican	Marshall Strong	2	1.90%	
Republican	James T. Lewis	1	0.95%	−1
Democratic	William Pitt Lynde	1	0.95%	−1
Democratic	Abram D. Smith	1	0.95%	
	John Y. Smith	1	0.95%	
	John H. Vance	1	0.95%	+1
	Frank H. Waite	1	0.95%	
	Absent or not voting	2		
Majority		53	50.48%	
Total votes		105	98.13%	
Void election result

3rd Vote of the 8th Wisconsin Legislature, January 30, 1855
Party	Candidate	Votes	%	±%
Republican	Charles Durkee	45	42.86%	−4
Democratic	Byron Kilbourn	20	19.05%	−2
Republican	James Duane Doty	12	11.43%	+3
Democratic	Harrison Carroll Hobart	6	5.71%	
	John H. Lathrop	6	5.71%	+4
Democratic	Eleazer Wakeley	3	2.86%	+3
Republican	Edward D. Holton	2	1.90%	
Republican	James T. Lewis	2	1.90%	+1
Republican	Marshall Strong	2	1.90%	
Democratic	Charles Dunn	1	0.95%	+1
Democratic	Morgan Lewis Martin	1	0.95%	−1
Democratic	William Pitt Lynde	1	0.95%	
Democratic	Edward G. Ryan	1	0.95%	−2
Democratic	Abram D. Smith	1	0.95%	
	John H. Vance	1	0.95%	
	Frank H. Waite	1	0.95%	
	Absent or not voting	2		
Majority		53	50.48%	
Total votes		105	98.13%	
Void election result

No person securing the majority, the convention voted to adjourn until 11am the following day.

=== Votes on January 31, 1855 ===
The legislature re-convened in joint session on Wednesday, January 31, and took three more votes for U.S. senator.

4th Vote of the 8th Wisconsin Legislature, January 31, 1855
Party	Candidate	Votes	%	±%
Republican	Charles Durkee	50	47.17%	+5
Democratic	Byron Kilbourn	15	14.15%	−5
Republican	James Duane Doty	11	10.38%	−1
Democratic	Harrison Carroll Hobart	5	4.72%	−1
Democratic	Eleazer Wakeley	5	4.72%	+2
Democratic	William Pitt Lynde	3	2.83%	+2
Democratic	Solomon Juneau	2	1.89%	+2
	John H. Lathrop	2	1.89%	−4
Republican	Marshall Strong	2	1.89%	
	Henry S. Baird	1	0.94%	+1
Democratic	Gabriel Bouck	1	0.94%	+1
Democratic	Samuel Crawford	1	0.94%	+1
Democratic	William M. Dennis	1	0.94%	+1
	Albert W. Emery	1	0.94%	+1
Republican	Edward D. Holton	1	0.94%	−1
	Jerome Lalor	1	0.94%	+1
Republican	James T. Lewis	1	0.94%	−1
Republican	Walter D. McIndoe	1	0.94%	+1
Democratic	William Rudolph Smith	1	0.94%	+1
	Frank H. Waite	1	0.94%	
	Absent or not voting	1		
Majority		54	50.94%	
Total votes		106	99.07%	
Void election result

5th Vote of the 8th Wisconsin Legislature, January 31, 1855
Party	Candidate	Votes	%	±%
Republican	Charles Durkee	50	47.17%	
Democratic	Byron Kilbourn	14	13.21%	−1
Republican	James Duane Doty	13	12.26%	+2
Democratic	Eleazer Wakeley	6	5.66%	+1
Democratic	William Pitt Lynde	3	2.83%	
Democratic	Harrison Carroll Hobart	2	1.89%	−3
	John H. Lathrop	2	1.89%	
Republican	Marshall Strong	2	1.89%	
Democratic	David Agry	1	0.94%	+1
	Henry S. Baird	1	0.94%	
Democratic	William A. Barstow	1	0.94%	+1
	E. B. Bowen	1	0.94%	+1
	William W. Brown	1	0.94%	+1
Democratic	Nelson Dewey	1	0.94%	+1
Democratic	Charles Dunn	1	0.94%	+1
	Albert W. Emery	1	0.94%	
Republican	Edward D. Holton	1	0.94%	
Democratic	Daniel Howell	1	0.94%	+1
	H. K. Laughlin	1	0.94%	+1
	General McManman	1	0.94%	+1
	Frank H. Waite	1	0.94%	
	Absent or not voting	1		
Majority		54	50.94%	
Total votes		106	99.07%	
Void election result

6th Vote of the 8th Wisconsin Legislature, January 31, 1855
Party	Candidate	Votes	%	±%
Republican	Charles Durkee	51	48.11%	+1
Republican	James Duane Doty	14	13.21%	+1
Democratic	Byron Kilbourn	12	11.32%	−2
Democratic	Eleazer Wakeley	10	9.43%	+4
Democratic	Morgan Lewis Martin	3	2.83%	+3
Democratic	Charles Dunn	2	1.89%	+1
	John H. Lathrop	2	1.89%	
Democratic	William Pitt Lynde	2	1.89%	−1
Republican	Marshall Strong	2	1.89%	
	Henry S. Baird	1	0.94%	
Republican	William H. Ebbets	1	0.94%	+1
Democratic	Charles A. Eldredge	1	0.94%	+1
Democratic	Harrison Carroll Hobart	1	0.94%	−1
Republican	Edward D. Holton	1	0.94%	
Democratic	William Hull	1	0.94%	+1
Republican	James T. Lewis	1	0.94%	+1
	Frank H. Waite	1	0.94%	
	Absent or not voting	1		
Majority		54	50.94%	
Total votes		106	99.07%	
Void election result

No person securing the majority, the convention voted to adjourn until 3pm the following day.

=== Votes on February 1, 1855 ===
The legislature re-convened in joint session on Thursday, February 1, and took two more votes for U.S. senator, finally achieving a majority on the 2nd vote of the day, the 8th ballot overall.

7th Vote of the 8th Wisconsin Legislature, February 1, 1855
Party	Candidate	Votes	%	±%
Republican	Charles Durkee	53	50.00%	+2
Democratic	Byron Kilbourn	38	35.85%	+26
	John H. Lathrop	4	3.77%	+2
Republican	James Duane Doty	2	1.89%	−12
Democratic	Harrison Carroll Hobart	2	1.89%	+1
Democratic	David Agry	1	0.94%	+1
	Henry S. Baird	1	0.94%	
Democratic	James S. Brown	1	0.94%	+1
Democratic	Charles Dunn	1	0.94%	−1
	Joseph Pierce	1	0.94%	+1
Democratic	Edward G. Ryan	1	0.94%	+1
Democratic	Abram D. Smith	1	0.94%	+1
	Absent or not voting	1		
Majority		54	50.94%	
Total votes		106	99.07%	
Void election result

8th Vote of the 8th Wisconsin Legislature, February 1, 1855
Party	Candidate	Votes	%	±%
Republican	Charles Durkee	54	50.47%	+1
Democratic	Byron Kilbourn	39	35.45%	+1
Democratic	Charles Dunn	5	4.67%	+4
Republican	James Duane Doty	4	3.74%	
Democratic	David Agry	2	1.87%	+1
Democratic	Harrison Carroll Hobart	2	1.87%	
Republican	James McMillan Shafter	1	0.93%	+1
Majority		54	50.47%	
Total votes		107	100.0%	
Republican gain from Democratic				

Charles Durkee, having received a majority of the 107 votes of the legislature, was declared elected U.S. senator.

== See also ==
- 1854–55 United States Senate elections
