= 8th Wisconsin Legislature =

Wisconsin legislative term for 1855

←	7th	9th	→
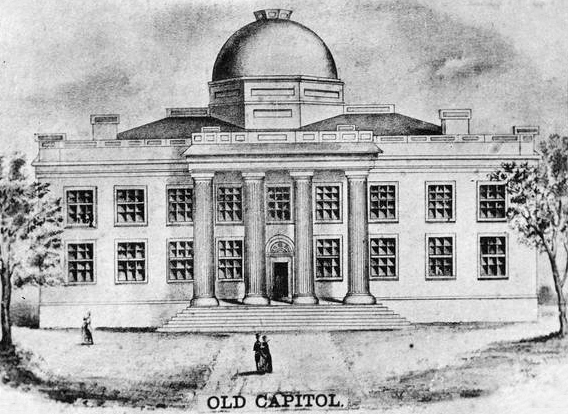
- Wisconsin State Capitol, 1855

Overview
- Legislative body: Wisconsin Legislature
- Meeting place: Wisconsin State Capitol
- Term: January 1, 1855 – January 7, 1856
- Election: November 7, 1854

Senate
- Members: 25
- Senate President: James T. Lewis (R)
- President pro tempore: Eleazer Wakeley (D)
- Party control: Democratic

Assembly
- Members: 82
- Assembly Speaker: Charles C. Sholes (R)
- Party control: Republican

Sessions
- 1st: January 10, 1855 – April 2, 1855

The Eighth Wisconsin Legislature convened from January 10, 1855, to April 2, 1855, in regular session.

This was the first Wisconsin legislature seated after the establishment of the Republican Party of Wisconsin.

Senators representing odd-numbered districts were newly elected for this session and were serving the first year of a two-year term. Assemblymembers were elected to a one-year term. Assemblymembers and odd-numbered senators were elected in the general election of November 7, 1854. Senators representing even-numbered districts were serving the second year of their two-year term, having been elected in the general election held on November 8, 1853.

The governor of Wisconsin during this entire term was Democrat William A. Barstow, of Waukesha County, serving the second year of a two-year term, having won election in the 1853 Wisconsin gubernatorial election.

== Major events ==
- February 1, 1855: Charles Durkee elected United States Senator by the Wisconsin Legislature in joint session.
- November 6, 1855: In the 1855 Wisconsin gubernatorial election, incumbent William A. Barstow was initially declared the winner. The election results were contested and eventually Coles Bashford, the Republican candidate, prevailed and became the next Governor of Wisconsin.

== Major legislation ==
- March 8, 1855: Act to provide for the division of the County of Adams, and to submit the question to a Vote of the people, 1855 Act 28. The referendum passed and resulted in the creation of Juneau County from the western half of Adams County.
- March 23, 1855: Act relative to the rights of married women, 1855 Act 49. Granted married women the rights to own property and conduct business in circumstances where the husband had been negligent or otherwise irresponsible.

== Party summary ==
=== Senate summary ===
Senate Partisan composition Democratic: 13 seats Independent: 1 seat Republican: 11 seats

	Party (Shading indicates majority caucus)					Total	
	Dem.	F.S.	Whig	Ind.	Rep.	Total	Vacant
End of previous Legislature	22	0	3	0	0	25	0
1st Session	13	0	0	1	11	25	0
Final voting share	52%	0%	0%	4%	44%		
Beginning of the next Legislature	12	0	0	0	13	25	0

=== Assembly summary ===
Assembly Partisan composition Democratic: 34 seats Independent: 4 seats Republican: 44 seats

	Party (Shading indicates majority caucus)					Total	
	Dem.	F.S.	Whig	Ind.	Rep.	Total	Vacant
End of previous Legislature	51	4	27	0	0	82	0
1st Session	34	0	0	4	44	82	0
Final voting share	41.46%	0.0%	0.0%	4.88%	53.66%		
Beginning of the next Legislature	46	0	0	1	35	82	0

== Sessions ==
- 1st Regular session: January 10, 1855 – April 2, 1855

== Leaders ==
=== Senate leadership ===
- President of the Senate: James T. Lewis, Lieutenant Governor
- President pro tempore: Eleazer Wakeley

=== Assembly leadership ===
- Speaker of the Assembly: Charles C. Sholes

== Members ==
=== Members of the Senate ===
Members of the Wisconsin Senate for the Eighth Wisconsin Legislature (25):

Senate partisan representation Democratic: 13 seats Independent: 1 seat Republican: 11 seats

District	Counties	Senator	Party	Residence
01	Calumet, Manitowoc, Sheboygan	David Taylor	Rep.	Sheboygan
02	Brown, Door, Kewaunee, Marathon, Oconto, Outagamie, Portage, Waupaca	Joseph F. Loy	Dem.	Green Bay
03	Ozaukee	Bolivar G. Gill	Dem.	Grafton
04	Washington	James Rolfe	Ind.	Jackson
05	Milwaukee (Northern Half)	Jackson Hadley	Dem.	Milwaukee
06	Milwaukee (Southern Half)	Edward McGarry	Dem.	Milwaukee
07	Racine	Charles Clement	Rep.	Racine
08	Kenosha	Francis Paddock	Rep.	Salem
09	Waukesha (Northern Half)	Denison Worthington	Rep.	Summit
10	Waukesha (Southern Half)	James D. Reymert	Dem.	Denoon
11	Dane	Hiram H. Giles	Rep.	Stoughton
12	Walworth	Eleazer Wakeley	Dem.	Whitewater
13	Lafayette	Charles Dunn	Dem.	Cottage Inn
14	Jefferson	Daniel Howell	Dem.	Jefferson
15	Iowa, Richland	Amasa Cobb	Rep.	Mineral Point
16	Grant	Nelson Dewey	Dem.	Lancaster
17	Rock (Western Half)	James Sutherland	Rep.	Janesville
18	Rock (Eastern Half)	Louis P. Harvey	Rep.	Shopiere
19	Bad Ax, Buffalo, Chippewa, Clark, Crawford, Jackson, La Crosse, La Pointe, Pierce, Polk, St. Croix	William J. Gibson	Dem.	Black River Falls
20	Fond du Lac	Charles A. Eldredge	Dem.	Fond du Lac
21	Winnebago	Coles Bashford	Rep.	Oshkosh
22	Dodge	Ezra A. Bowen	Dem.	Mayville
23	Adams, Marquette, Sauk, Waushara	Edwin B. Kelsey	Dem.	Montello
24	Green	Francis H. West	Rep.	Monroe
25	Columbia	John Q. Adams	Rep.	Fall River

=== Members of the Assembly ===
Members of the Assembly for the Eighth Wisconsin Legislature (82):

Assembly partisan representation Democratic: 34 seats Independent: 4 seats Republican: 44 seats

Senate District	County	District	Representative	Party	Residence
23	Adams & Sauk		Richard H. Davis	Rep.	Baraboo
19	Bad Ax & Crawford		James Fisher	Dem.	Prairie du Chien
02	Brown, Door, Kewaunee		Morgan L. Martin	Ind.	Green Bay
19	Buffalo, Chippewa, La Crosse		Chase A. Stevens	Dem.	La Crosse
01	Calumet		Almond Merrill	Rep.	Charlestown
25	Columbia	1	William T. Whirry	Dem.	Randolph
25	Columbia	2	Alfred Topliff	Rep.	Columbus
11	Dane	1	Jonathan Mosher	Rep.	Stoughton
11	Dane	2	William R. Taylor	Dem.	Cottage Grove
11	Dane	3	Samuel G. Abbott	Rep.	Verona
11	Dane	4	George P. Thompson	Dem.	Cross Plains
11	Dane	5	Levi Baker Vilas	Dem.	Madison
22	Dodge	1	Narcisse Juneau	Dem.	Theresa
22	Dodge	2	John B. Ribble	Dem.	Horicon
22	Dodge	3	Fred F. Schwefel	Ind.	Lebanon
22	Dodge	4	John D. Griffin	Dem.	Shields
22	Dodge	5	Solomon L. Rose	Dem.	Beaver Dam
22	Dodge	6	John M. Sherman	Rep.	Burnett
20	Fond du Lac	1	George W. Parker	Rep.	Metomen
20	Fond du Lac	2	Benjamin R. Harrington	Rep.	Byron
20	Fond du Lac	3	William H. Ebbets	Dem.	Fond du Lac
20	Fond du Lac	4	John Boyd	Dem.	Calumet
16	Grant	1	Allen Taylor	Rep.	Hazel Green
16	Grant	2	William Hull	Dem.	Potosi
16	Grant	3	Noah H. Virgin	Rep.	Beetown
16	Grant	4	William W. Field	Rep.	Platteville
16	Grant	5	William Cole	Rep.	Fennimore
24	Green		Amos D. Kirkpatrick	Rep.	Dayton
15	Iowa	1	Stephen P. Hollenbeck	Rep.	Highland
15	Iowa	2	John Love	Rep.	Mineral Point
14	Jefferson	1	Patrick Rogan	Dem.	Watertown
14	Jefferson	2	John G. Merriam	Rep.	Lake Mills
14	Jefferson	3	A. H. Van Norstrand	Dem.	Jefferson
14	Jefferson	4	John Gibb	Dem.	Ixonia
14	Jefferson	5	Willard Grant	Rep.	Hebron
08	Kenosha	1	Charles C. Sholes	Rep.	Kenosha
08	Kenosha	2	Philander Judson	Rep.	Bristol
13	Lafayette	1	James Earnest	Dem.	New Diggings
13	Lafayette	2	A. A. Townsend	Rep.	Shullsburg
13	Lafayette	3	Joseph White	Dem.	Cottage Inn
19	La Pointe, Pierce, Polk, & St. Croix		Smith R. Gunn	Rep.	Prescott
01	Manitowoc		James Bennett	Rep.	Manitowoc
02	Marathon & Portage		Walter D. McIndoe	Rep.	Wausau
23	Marquette & Waushara	1	Harvey Grant	Rep.	Tichora
23	Marquette & Waushara	2	Samuel R. Rood	Dem.	Packwaukee
05	Milwaukee	1	James B. Cross	Dem.	Milwaukee
05	Milwaukee	2	Jasper Vliet	Dem.	Milwaukee
06	Milwaukee	3	Edward O'Neill	Dem.	Milwaukee
06	Milwaukee	4	I. E. Goodall	Rep.	Milwaukee
06	Milwaukee	5	Edwin De Wolf	Ind.	Milwaukee
06	Milwaukee	6	John Ruan	Dem.	Oak Creek
06	Milwaukee	7	Peter Lavies	Dem.	Greenfield
05	Milwaukee	8	Reuben Chase	Rep.	Wauwatosa
05	Milwaukee	9	Frederick Moskowitt	Dem.	Milwaukee
02	Oconto, Outagamie, & Waupaca		Perry H. Smith	Dem.	Appleton
03	Ozaukee	1	William H. Ramsey	Dem.	Ozaukee
03	Ozaukee	2	Henry Blazer	Dem.	Mequon River
07	Racine	1	Thomas Falvey	Dem.	Racine
07	Racine	2	Alanson Filer	Rep.	Racine
07	Racine	3	Ebenezer Adams	Rep.	Yorkville
07	Racine	4	Caleb P. Barns	Dem.	Burlington
15	Richland		Daniel L. Downs	Dem.	Richmond
18	Rock	1	Samuel G. Colley	Rep.	Beloit
18	Rock	2	Joseph Goodrich	Rep.	Milton
17	Rock	3	George H. Williston	Rep.	Janesville
17	Rock	4	Nathan B. Howard	Rep.	Magnolia
01	Sheboygan	1	Joseph Schrage	Rep.	Sheboygan
01	Sheboygan	2	Luther H. Cary	Rep.	Greenbush
12	Walworth	1	Solmous Wakeley	Rep.	Whitewater
12	Walworth	2	Daniel Hooper	Rep.	Troy
12	Walworth	3	Samuel Pratt	Rep.	Spring Prairie
12	Walworth	4	Levi Lee	Rep.	Elkhorn
12	Walworth	5	Willard W. Isham	Rep.	Delavan
12	Walworth	6	George Allen	Rep.	Linn
04	Washington	1	Byron Smith	Dem.	Erin
04	Washington	2	Mitchell L. Delaney	Rep.	Barton
09	Waukesha	1	Stephen Warren	Rep.	Delafield
09	Waukesha	2	Benjamin F. Goss	Dem.	Pewaukee
10	Waukesha	3	Joseph Bond	Dem.	Mukwonago
10	Waukesha	4	Alexander W. Randall	Ind.	Waukesha
21	Winnebago	1	George Gary	Rep.	Oshkosh
21	Winnebago	2	Ebenezer S. Welch	Rep.	Neenah

== Employees ==
=== Senate employees ===
- Chief Clerk: Samuel G. Bugh
- Sergeant-at-Arms: William H. Gleason

=== Assembly employees ===
- Chief Clerk: David Atwood
- Sergeant-at-Arms: William Blake
