= 1854–55 United States Senate elections =

- Various dates
- Class 3

21 of the 62 seats in the United States Senate (with special elections) 32 seats needed for a majority
| | Majority party | Minority party | Third party |
|---|---|---|---|
| Party | Democratic | Whig | Republican |
| Last election | 34 seats | 20 seats | New party |
| Seats before | 36 | 18 |
| Seats won | 8 | 3 | 3 |
| Seats after | 33 | 14 | 3 |
| Seat change | ▼3 | ▼4 | ▲3 |
| Seats up | 11 | 7 | Steady |
| | Fourth party | Fifth party |
| Party | Free Soil | American |
| Last election | 2 seats | 1 seat |
| Seats before | 4 | 1 |
| Seats won | 1 | 0 |
| Seats after | 2 | 1 |
| Seat change | ▼2 | Steady |
| Seats up | 3 | 0 |
- Results: Democratic gain Democratic hold Whig hold Free Soil Gain American Gain; Republican Gain Legislature failed to elect
Majority party before election
Democratic
Elected Majority party
Democratic

The 1854–55 United States Senate elections were held on various dates in various states. As these U.S. Senate elections were prior to the ratification of the Seventeenth Amendment in 1913, senators were chosen by state legislatures. Senators were elected over a wide range of time throughout 1854 and 1855, and a seat may have been filled months late or remained vacant due to legislative deadlock. In these elections, terms were up for the senators in Class 3.

These elections saw the final decline of the Whig Party and the maintained majority of the Democrats. Those Whigs in the Southern United States who were opposed to secession ran on the "Opposition Party" ticket, and were elected to a minority. Along with the Whigs, the Senate roster also included Free Soilers, Americans, and a new party: the Republicans. Only five of the twenty-one senators up for election were re-elected.

== Results summary ==
Senate party division, 34th Congress (1855–1857)

- Majority party: Democratic (35)
- Minority party: Opposition (20) (Whigs, Republicans, Americans, Free Soilers)
- Vacant: 7
- Total seats: 62

== Change in Senate composition ==
=== Before the elections ===
After the October 14, 1854 special election in Vermont.

| D_{1} | | | | | | | | | |
| D_{2} | D_{3} | D_{4} | D_{5} | D_{6} | D_{7} | D_{8} | D_{9} | D_{10} | D_{11} |
| D_{21} | D_{20} | D_{19} | D_{18} | D_{17} | D_{16} | D_{15} | D_{14} | D_{13} | D_{12} |
| D_{22} | D_{23} | D_{24} | D_{25} | D_{26} Ran | D_{27} Ran | D_{28} Ran | D_{29} Ran | D_{30} Ran | D_{31} Ran |
| Majority → | | | | | | | | | D_{32} Ran |
| FS_{4} Retired | A_{1} | V_{1} | V_{2} | V_{3} | D_{36} Retired | D_{35} Unknown | D_{34} Unknown | D_{33} Ran | D_{32} Ran |
| FS_{3} Retired | FS_{2} Retired | FS_{1} | W_{18} Retired | W_{17} Retired | W_{16} Retired | W_{15} Unknown | W_{14} Unknown | W_{13} Ran | W_{12} Ran |
| W_{2} | W_{3} | W_{4} | W_{5} | W_{6} | W_{7} | W_{8} | W_{9} | W_{10} | W_{11} |
| W_{1} | | | | | | | | | |

=== As a result of the elections ===
| D_{1} | | | | | | | | | |
| D_{2} | D_{3} | D_{4} | D_{5} | D_{6} | D_{7} | D_{8} | D_{9} | D_{10} | D_{11} |
| D_{21} | D_{20} | D_{19} | D_{18} | D_{17} | D_{16} | D_{15} | D_{14} | D_{13} | D_{12} |
| D_{22} | D_{23} | D_{24} | D_{25} | D_{26} Re-elected | D_{27} Re-elected | D_{28} Re-elected | D_{29} Hold | D_{30} Gain | D_{31} Gain |
| Majority → | | | | | | | | | D_{32} Gain |
| V_{2} | V_{3} | V_{4} | V_{5} D Loss | V_{6} D Loss | V_{7} D Loss | V_{8} D Loss | V_{9} D Loss | D_{33} Gain | D_{32} Gain |
| V_{1} W Loss | A_{1} | FS_{2} Gain | FS_{1} | R_{3} Gain | R_{2} Gain | R_{1} Gain | W_{14} Hold | W_{13} Re-elected | W_{12} Re-elected |
| W_{2} | W_{3} | W_{4} | W_{5} | W_{6} | W_{7} | W_{8} | W_{9} | W_{10} | W_{11} |
| W_{1} | | | | | | | | | |

=== Beginning of the next Congress ===
| D_{1} | | | | | | | | | |
| D_{2} | D_{3} | D_{4} | D_{5} | D_{6} | D_{7} | D_{8} | D_{9} | D_{10} | D_{11} |
| D_{21} | D_{20} | D_{19} | D_{18} | D_{17} | D_{16} | D_{15} | D_{14} | D_{13} | D_{12} |
| D_{22} | D_{23} | D_{24} | D_{25} | D_{26} | D_{27} | D_{28} | D_{29} | D_{30} | D_{31} |
| Majority → | | | | | | | | | D_{32} |
| V_{2} | V_{3} | V_{4} | V_{5} | V_{6} | V_{7} | D_{35} Gain | D_{34} Gain | D_{33} | D_{32} |
| V_{1} | A_{2} Changed | A_{1} | FS_{2} | FS_{1} | R_{7} Gain | R_{6} Changed | R_{5} Changed | R_{4} Changed | R_{3} |
| W_{2} | W_{3} | W_{4} | W_{5} | W_{6} | W_{7} | W_{8} | W_{9} | R_{1} | R_{2} |
| W_{1} | | | | | | | | | |

=== Beginning of the first session, December 3, 1855 ===
| D_{1} | | | | | | | | | |
| D_{2} | D_{3} | D_{4} | D_{5} | D_{6} | D_{7} | D_{8} | D_{9} | D_{10} | D_{11} |
| D_{21} | D_{20} | D_{19} | D_{18} | D_{17} | D_{16} | D_{15} | D_{14} | D_{13} | D_{12} |
| D_{22} | D_{23} | D_{24} | D_{25} | D_{26} | D_{27} | D_{28} | D_{29} | D_{30} | D_{31} |
| Majority → | | | | | | | | | D_{32} |
| A_{2} | V_{1} | V_{2} | V_{3} | V_{4} | D_{36} Gain | D_{35} | D_{34} | D_{33} | D_{32} |
| A_{1} | FS_{2} | FS_{1} | R_{9} Gain | R_{8} Gain | R_{7} | R_{6} | R_{5} | R_{4} | R_{3} |
| W_{2} | W_{3} | W_{4} | W_{5} | W_{6} | W_{7} | W_{8} | W_{9} | R_{1} | R_{2} |
| W_{1} | | | | | | | | | |

Key:

| D_{#} | Democratic |
| FS_{#} | Free Soil |
| A_{#} | American |
| R_{#} | Republican |
| W_{#} | Whig |
| V_{#} | Vacant |

== Race summaries ==
=== Special elections during the 33rd Congress ===
In these special elections, the winners were seated during 1854 or in 1855 before March 4; ordered by election date.

| State | Incumbent | | | Results | Candidates |
| State | Senator | Party | Electoral history | Results | Candidates |
|---|---|---|---|---|---|
| Mississippi (Class 2) | Vacant | | | Legislature had failed to elect in 1853. New senator elected January 7, 1854. Democratic gain. | ▌ ✓ Albert G. Brown (Democratic); [data missing] |
| Connecticut (Class 3) | Truman Smith | Whig | 1848 or 1849 | Incumbent resigned May 24, 1854. New senator elected May 24, 1854. Free Soil gain. Successor did not run for the next term, see below. | ▌ ✓ Francis Gillette (Free Soil); [data missing] |
| Vermont (Class 3) | Samuel S. Phelps | Whig | 1853 (appointed) | Incumbent lost entitlement to sit on March 16, 1854. New senator elected October 14, 1854. Free Soil gain. Successor did not run for the next term, see below. | ▌ ✓ Lawrence Brainerd (Free Soil); [data missing] |
| Arkansas (Class 3) | Robert W. Johnson | Democratic | 1853 (appointed) | Interim appointee elected November 10, 1854. Winner was later elected to the next term; see below. | ▌ ✓ Robert W. Johnson (Democratic); [data missing] |
| North Carolina (Class 2) | Vacant | | | Legislature had failed to elect in 1853. New senator elected November 24, 1854. Democratic gain. | ▌ ✓ David Settle Reid (Democratic); [data missing] |
| Massachusetts (Class 2) | Julius Rockwell | Whig | 1854 (appointed) | Interim appointee lost election. Successor elected January 31, 1855. American gain. | ▌ ✓ Henry Wilson (American); ▌Nahum F. Bryant (American); ▌Ephraim M. Wright (Whig); ▌Julius Rockwell (Whig) |

=== Elections leading to the 34th Congress ===
In these general elections, the winners were elected for the term beginning March 4, 1855; ordered by state.

All of the elections involved the Class 3 seats.

| State | Incumbent | | | Results | Candidates |
| State | Senator | Party | Electoral history | Results | Candidates |
|---|---|---|---|---|---|
| Alabama | Benjamin Fitzpatrick | Democratic | 1848 (appointed); 1849 (successor elected); 1853 (appointed); 1853 (special) | Incumbent retired or lost re-election. Legislature failed to elect. Democratic loss. Seat would remain vacant until November 26, 1855; see below. | [data missing] |
| Arkansas | Robert W. Johnson | Democratic | 1853 (appointed); 1854 (special) | Incumbent re-elected in 1855. | ▌ ✓ Robert W. Johnson (Democratic); [data missing] |
| California | William M. Gwin | Democratic | 1850 | Legislature failed to elect. Democratic loss. Seat would remain vacant until 1857. | ▌William M. Gwin (Democratic) |
| Connecticut | Francis Gillette | Free Soil | 1854 (special) | Incumbent retired. Successor elected in 1854. Republican gain. | ▌ ✓ Lafayette S. Foster (Republican); [data missing] |
| Florida | Jackson Morton | Whig | 1848 | Incumbent retired. New senator elected in 1854. Democratic gain. | ▌ ✓ David Levy Yulee (Democratic); [data missing] |
| Georgia | William Crosby Dawson | Whig | 1847 | Incumbent retired or lost re-election. New senator elected in 1854 or 1855. Democratic gain. | ▌ ✓ Alfred Iverson Sr. (Democratic); [data missing] |
| Illinois | James Shields | Democratic | 1849 | Incumbent lost re-election. New senator elected February 8, 1855. Democratic hold. | ▌ ✓ Lyman Trumbull (Democratic) 51; ▌Joel A. Matteson (Democratic) 47; ▌Archibald Williams (Whig) 1 |
| Indiana | John Pettit | Democratic | 1853 (special) | Incumbent lost re-election. Legislature failed to elect. Democratic loss. Seat would remain vacant util 1857. | ▌John Pettit (Democratic) [data missing] |
| Iowa | Augustus C. Dodge | Democratic | 1848; 1849 | Incumbent lost re-election. Incumbent then resigned February 22, 1855 to become U.S. Minister to Spain. Successor elected in 1855. Free Soil gain. | ▌ ✓ James Harlan (Free Soil); ▌Augustus C. Dodge (Democratic); [data missing] |
| Kentucky | Archibald Dixon | Whig | 1851 (special) | Incumbent retired. Successor elected January 10, 1854. Whig hold. | ▌ ✓ John J. Crittenden (Whig) 78; ▌Lazarus W. Powell (Democratic) 59 |
| Louisiana | John Slidell | Democratic | 1853 (special) | Incumbent re-elected in 1854 or 1855. | ▌ ✓ John Slidell (Democratic); [data missing] |
| Maryland | James Pearce | Whig | 1843; 1849 | Incumbent re-elected in 1855. | ▌ ✓ James Pearce (Whig); [data missing] |
| Missouri | David Rice Atchison | Democratic | 1843 (appointed); 1843 (special); 1849 | Incumbent lost re-election. Legislature failed to elect. Democratic loss. Seat would remain vacant until 1857. | ▌David Rice Atchison (Democratic); ▌Thomas Hart Benton (Democratic); ▌ [?] (Whig) |
| New Hampshire | John S. Wells | Democratic | 1855 (appointed) | Incumbent retired or lost re-election. Legislature failed to elect. Democratic loss. Seat would remain vacant until July 30, 1855, see below. | [data missing] |
| New York | William H. Seward | Whig | 1849 | Incumbent re-elected February 6, 1855. Winner became a Republican shortly thereafter. | ▌ ✓ William H. Seward (Whig); ▌Daniel S. Dickinson (Dem./Hard); ▌Horatio Seymour (Dem./Soft); ▌Washington Hunt (Whig); ▌John Adams Dix (Dem./Soft); ▌Millard Fillmore (Whig); ▌William F. Allen (Democratic); Others, see below |
| North Carolina | George Badger | Whig | 1846 (special); 1849 | Incumbent retired. New senator elected on November 25, 1854. Democratic gain. | ▌ ✓ Asa Biggs (Democratic); [data missing] |
| Ohio | Salmon P. Chase | Free Soil | 1849 | Incumbent retired. Successor elected March 4, 1854. Democratic gain. | ▌ ✓ George E. Pugh (Democratic) 80 votes; ▌Ephraim R. Eckley (Whig) 15 votes; ▌Salmon P. Chase (Whig) 10 votes; ▌Robert C. Schenck (Whig) 1 vote |
| Pennsylvania | James Cooper | Whig | 1849 | Unknown if incumbent retired or lost re-election. Legislature failed to elect. Whig loss. Seat would remain vacant until 1856. | ▌Simon Cameron (American); ▌Charles R. Buckalew (Democratic) |
| South Carolina | Andrew Butler | Democratic | 1852 (appointed) ? (special); 1848 | Incumbent re-elected in 1854. | ▌ ✓ Andrew Butler (Democratic); [data missing] |
| Vermont | Lawrence Brainerd | Free Soil | 1854 | Incumbent retired. New senator elected in 1855. Republican gain. | ▌ ✓ Jacob Collamer (Republican); [data missing] |
| Wisconsin | Isaac P. Walker | Democratic | 1848; 1849 | Incumbent retired. New senator elected February 1, 1855. Republican gain. | ▌ ✓ Charles Durkee (Republican) 50.47%; ▌ Byron Kilbourn (Democratic) 36.45%; ▌ Charles Dunn (Democratic) 4.67%; ▌ James Duane Doty (Republican) 3.74%; ▌ Harrison Carroll Hobart (Democratic) 1.87%; ▌ David Agry (Democratic) 1.87%; ▌ James McMillan Shafter (Republican) 0.93% |

=== Elections during the 34th Congress ===
In these elections, the winners were elected in 1855 after March 4.

| State | Incumbent | | | Results | Candidates |
| State | Senator | Party | Electoral history | Results | Candidates |
|---|---|---|---|---|---|
| New Hampshire (Class 2) | Vacant | | | Charles G. Atherton (D) died November 15, 1853. Jared W. Williams (D) was appointed to continue Atherton's term. Williams's appointment expired July 15, 1854 when the legislature then failed to elect a successor. New senator elected July 30, 1855. Republican gain. | ▌ ✓ John P. Hale (Republican); [data missing] |
| New Hampshire (Class 3) | Vacant | | | John S. Wells's (D) term expired March 3, 1855. Legislature had failed to elect. New senator elected late July 30, 1855. Republican gain. | ▌ ✓ James Bell (Republican); [data missing] |
| Alabama (Class 3) | Vacant | | | Benjamin Fitzpatrick's (D) term expired March 3, 1855. Legislature had failed to elect. Incumbent was then elected late November 26, 1855. Democratic gain. | ▌ ✓ Benjamin Fitzpatrick (Democratic); [data missing] |

== Kentucky ==
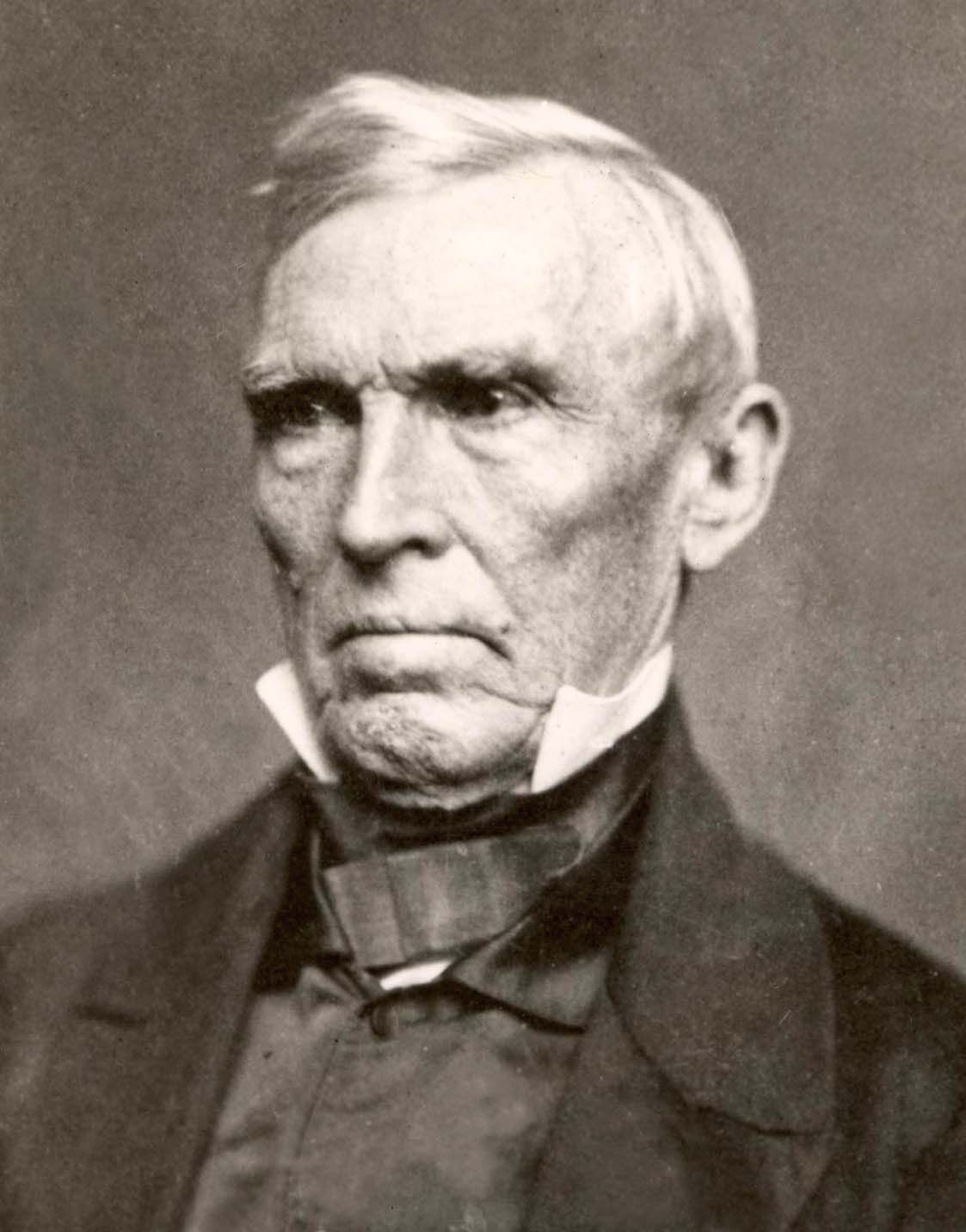
Senator John J. Crittenden

On January 10, 1854, the Kentucky legislature elected Whig U.S. Attorney General (and former-senator and former-Governor of Kentucky) John J. Crittenden to succeed Dixon, beating the then-incumbent Governor of Kentucky, Lazarus W. Powell.

- John J. Crittenden (Whig) 78 votes
- Lazarus W. Powell (Democratic) 59 votes

== Maryland ==
1855 United States Senate election in Maryland
- January 1855

80 members of the Maryland General Assembly
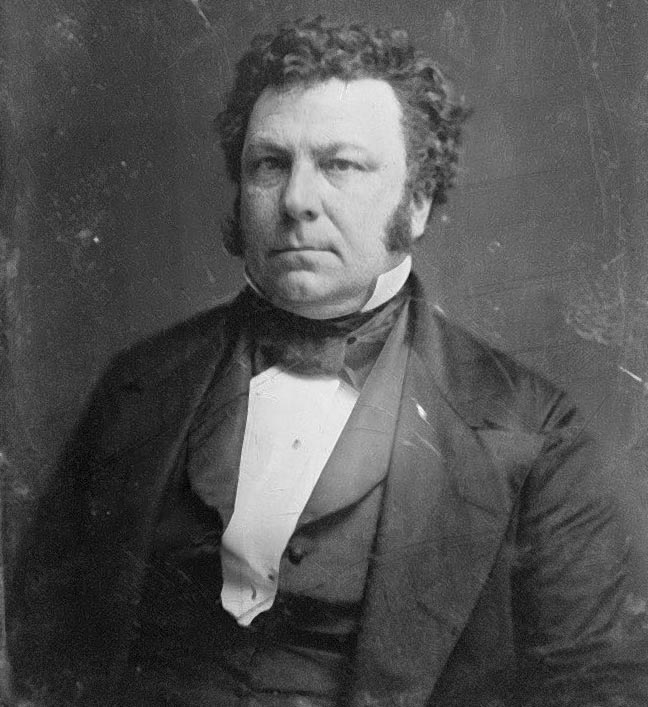
| Candidate | James Pearce |
| Party | Whig |
| Legislative vote | - |
| Percentage | -% |

James Pearce won re-election by an unknown margin of votes, for the Class 3 seat.

== New York ==
The election was held on February 6, 1855. William H. Seward had been elected in 1849 to this seat and his term would expire on March 3, 1855. At the time the Democratic Party was split into two opposing factions: the "Hards" and the "Softs". After most of the "Barnburners" had left the party, joining the Whigs, the majority of "Hunkers" split over the question of reconciliation with the minority of Barnburners who had remained Democrats. The Hard faction (led by Daniel S. Dickinson) was against it, in true Hunker fashion claiming all patronage for themselves; the Soft faction (led by William L. Marcy, which included the former Barnburners, advocated party unity as a necessity to defeat the Whigs.

In 1854, the Republican Party was founded as a national party, but in New York the Whigs and the Anti-Nebraska Party ran concurrently at the State election. The unification of these occurred in New York only during the nomination convention for the State election in November 1855. Also running in the 1854 election were the American Party and nominees of the Temperance movement. In a general way, party lines were blurred until the re-alignment during the late 1850s after the disbanding of the American Party.

At the State election in November 1853, 23 Whigs, 7 Hards and 2 Softs were elected for a two-year term (1854–1855) in the State Senate. At the State election in November 1854, Whig State Senator Myron H. Clark was elected Governor of New York, and 82 Whigs, 26 Softs, 16 Hards and 3 Temperance men were elected for the session of 1855 to the New York State Assembly. "Know Nothings are sprinkled miscellaneously among Whigs, Hards and Softs; and exactly how many there are of these gentry in the Assembly Nobody Knows." The 78th New York State Legislature met from January 2 to April 14, 1855, at Albany, New York.

In the Assembly, Seward received 69 votes, given by 65 Whigs; 1 Democrat; 1 Temperance man; 1 Republican and 1 Whig-Republican. Dickinson received 14 votes, given by 13 Democrats and 1 American. Horatio Seymour received the votes of 12 Democrats. Dix received 7 votes, given by 5 Democrats; 1 Independent Democrat and 1 Temperance man. Fillmore received 4 votes, given by 2 Whigs; 1 Democrat and 1 Temperance-American. Horatio Seymour Jr., received the votes of 2 Americans. King, Butler, Lester, Wait and Bronson received 1 Democratic vote each. Campbell received 1 Temperance-American vote. Howell received 1 American vote. Hoffman and Haven received 1 Whig vote each.

In the State Senate, Seward received 18 Whig votes, Dickinson 5 Hard votes, and Allen 2 Whig votes. Preston and Church received 1 Soft vote each. Hoffman, Babcock, Ullmann and Fillmore received 1 American vote each.

Seward was the choice of both the Assembly and the Senate, and was declared elected.

| Candidate | Party | Senate (32 members) | Assembly (128 members) |
|---|---|---|---|
| √ William H. Seward | Whig | √ 18 | √ 69 |
| Daniel S. Dickinson | Dem./Hard | 5 | 14 |
| Horatio Seymour | Dem./Soft | | 12 |
| Washington Hunt | Whig | | 9 |
| John Adams Dix | Dem./Soft | | 7 |
| Millard Fillmore | Whig | 1 | 4 |
| William F. Allen | Democratic | 2 | |
| Horatio Seymour Jr. | | | 2 |
| Preston King | | 1 | 1 |
| Ogden Hoffman | Whig | 1 | 1 |
| Daniel Ullmann | American | 1 | |
| Sanford E. Church | Democratic | 1 | |
| George R. Babcock | Whig | 1 | |
| William W. Campbell | American | | 1 |
| Benjamin F. Butler | Democratic | | 1 |
| Albert Lester | Democratic | | 1 |
| Greene C. Bronson | Democratic | | 1 |
| Solomon G. Haven | Opposition | | 1 |
| John D. Howell | | | 1 |
| L. or J. Wait | | | 1 |

== See also ==
- 1854 United States elections
  - 1854–55 United States House of Representatives elections
- 33rd United States Congress
- 34th United States Congress
