= Samuel Pratt =

American politician (1807–1877)

Member of the Wisconsin Senate
- In office January 1, 1872 – January 5, 1874
- Preceded by: Milton Pettit
- Succeeded by: Thompson Weeks
- Constituency: 8th Senate district
- In office January 3, 1870 – January 1, 1872
- Preceded by: Newton Littlejohn
- Succeeded by: Orrin Bacon
- Constituency: 12th Senate district

Member of the Wisconsin State Assembly
- In office January 5, 1863 – January 4, 1864
- Preceded by: Fayette P. Arnold
- Succeeded by: John Jeffers
- Constituency: Walworth 1st district
- In office January 1, 1855 – January 7, 1856
- Preceded by: Oscar Bartlett
- Succeeded by: John F. Potter
- Constituency: Walworth 3rd district
- In office January 1, 1849 – January 7, 1850
- Preceded by: Gaylord Graves
- Succeeded by: Alexander O. Babcock
- Constituency: Walworth 1st district

Personal details
- Born: October 6, 1807 Enfield, Massachusetts, U.S.
- Died: March 24, 1877 (aged 69) Walworth County, Wisconsin, U.S.
- Resting place: Hickory Grove Cemetery, Spring Prairie, Wisconsin
- Party: Republican; Free Soil (before 1854)
- Spouse: Angelina E. Miller
- Children: Orris Pratt; (b. 1837; died 1906)

Samuel Pratt (October 6, 1807 – March 24, 1877) was an American farmer, Republican politician, and Wisconsin pioneer. He was an early settler at Spring Prairie, Wisconsin, and represented his region in the Wisconsin State Assembly and State Senate for nine sessions between 1849 and 1874.

== Background ==
Pratt was born in Enfield, Massachusetts on October 6, 1817. In his eighth year his parents removed to Geauga County, Ohio; then in 1829, they moved to White Pigeon, Michigan. "the country at that time being very new, there being no grist- or sawmill nearer than 100 miles distant, and only a horse-back mail once a week between Detroit and Chicago, and no newspaper published within 130 miles". Due to the lack of schools in the frontier regions where his family had lived, he received only a limited education. He took up the occupation of farmer.

He came to Wisconsin in 1837, and settled in Spring Prairie, but did not move his family until February 1845.

== Public office ==
He was first elected to a one-year term as a member of the Assembly from Walworth County's 1st Assembly district (Troy, East Troy, and Spring Prairie in 1848 as a Free Soiler to succeed Democrat Gaylord Graves; he was succeeded by Whig Alexander O. Babcock. As a Republican he was elected once more in 1854 for a new district (it was during this term of office that he was one of those who harbored fugitive slave Joshua Glover until he could be safely sent to Canada); and again in 1863 for the redrawn 1st Assembly district (succeeding Democrat Hollis Latham); he was succeeded in turn by Lucius Allen of the National Union Party.

He was elected to the Senate (as a Republican) from the 12th district in 1869, succeeding fellow Republican Newton Littlejohn), and re-elected from the new 8th District in 1871, receiving 3,956 votes against 2,161 for Democrat John Tuttle. He would be succeeded by Thompson Weeks, another Republican.

== Farming and personal life ==
Pratt was the chairman of the convention in the Wisconsin State Capitol which on February 21, 1849 resolved on the organization of a Wisconsin State Agricultural Society; and became a charter member thereof.

He was a judge for Devon cattle for the 1861 and 1864 Wisconsin State Fairs.

His son, Orris Pratt, would also become a member of the Wisconsin State Assembly.

Pratt died in Racine, Wisconsin, in March 1877, while visiting his brother, Benjamin.

Wisconsin State Assembly
Preceded by Gaylord Graves	Member of the Wisconsin State Assembly from the Walworth 1st district January 1, 1849 – January 7, 1850	Succeeded by Alexander O. Babcock
Preceded by Oscar Bartlett	Member of the Wisconsin State Assembly from the Walworth 3rd district January 1, 1855 – January 7, 1856	Succeeded by John F. Potter
Preceded by Fayette P. Arnold	Member of the Wisconsin State Assembly from the Walworth 1st district January 5, 1863 – January 4, 1864	Succeeded by John Jeffers
Wisconsin Senate
Preceded by Newton Littlejohn	Member of the Wisconsin Senate from the 12th district January 3, 1870 – January 1, 1872	Succeeded by Orrin Bacon
Preceded by Milton Pettit	Member of the Wisconsin Senate from the 8th district January 1, 1872 – January 5, 1874	Succeeded by Thompson Weeks
