= Thompson Weeks =

American politician (1832–1901)

President pro tempore of the Wisconsin Senate
- In office January 7, 1895 – January 4, 1897
- Preceded by: Robert MacBride
- Succeeded by: Lyman W. Thayer

Member of the Wisconsin Senate
- In office January 2, 1893 – January 4, 1897
- Preceded by: Charles Simeon Taylor
- Succeeded by: John W. Whelan
- Constituency: 24th Senate district
- In office January 5, 1874 – January 3, 1876
- Preceded by: Samuel Pratt
- Succeeded by: Asahel Farr
- Constituency: 8th Senate district

Member of the Wisconsin State Assembly from the Walworth 3rd district
- In office January 7, 1867 – January 6, 1868
- Preceded by: Shepard O. Raymond
- Succeeded by: George A. Ray

Personal details
- Born: November 5, 1832 Norwich, Massachusetts, U.S.
- Died: February 12, 1901 (aged 68) Whitewater, Wisconsin, U.S.
- Resting place: Hillside Cemetery, Whitewater, Wisconsin
- Party: Republican
- Spouse: Adelaide M. Hall (m. 1865–1901)
- Children: Helen Louise (Wakeley); (b. 1866; died 1907)
- Education: Lawrence University; Albany Law School
- Profession: lawyer

Thompson Dimock Weeks (November 5, 1832 – February 12, 1901) was an American lawyer and Republican politician. He served six years in the Wisconsin State Senate, representing Walworth County, and was president pro tempore of the Senate during the 1895–1896 session. He also served one term in the Wisconsin State Assembly.

== Biography ==
Born in Norwich, Massachusetts, he settled in Lyons, Wisconsin Territory, in 1843. Weeks then moved to Whitewater, Wisconsin in 1860. Weeks graduated from Lawrence University in 1858 and Albany Law School in 1859. He then practiced law in Wisconsin. Weeks served in the Wisconsin State Assembly in 1867 as a Republican and then in the Wisconsin State Senate in 1874 and in 1895. Weeks also served on the board or regents for Wisconsin normal schools. He died in Whitewater, Wisconsin.

Wisconsin State Assembly
Preceded by Shepard O. Raymond	Member of the Wisconsin State Assembly from the Walworth 3rd district January 7, 1867 – January 6, 1868	Succeeded by George A. Ray
Wisconsin Senate
Preceded by Samuel Pratt	Member of the Wisconsin Senate from the 8th district January 5, 1874 – January 3, 1876	Succeeded by Asahel Farr
Preceded by Charles Simeon Taylor	Member of the Wisconsin Senate from the 24th district January 2, 1893 – January 4, 1897	Succeeded by John W. Whelan
Preceded by Robert MacBride	President pro tempore of the Wisconsin Senate; January 7, 1895 – January 4, 1897	Succeeded by Lyman W. Thayer
