= Jesse C. Mills =

19th century American physician and politician

Member of the Wisconsin Senate from the 12th district
- In office January 7, 1856 – January 4, 1858
- Preceded by: Eleazer Wakeley
- Succeeded by: John W. Boyd

Chairman of the Board of Supervisors of Walworth County, Wisconsin
- In office 1843
- Preceded by: John M. Capron
- Succeeded by: Gaylord Graves

Member of the House of Representatives of the Wisconsin Territory for Rock & Walworth counties
- In office January 6, 1845 – January 5, 1846 Serving with Stephen Field, Salmon Thomas, & Jesse Moore
- Preceded by: John Hopkins, James Tripp, John M. Capron, & William A. Bartlett
- Succeeded by: Ira Jones, Caleb Crosswell, Warren Earl, & Gaylord Graves
- In office December 7, 1840 – December 5, 1842 Serving with John Hackett (1840–42), Hugh Long (1840–41), Edward V. Whiton (1840–42), & James Tripp (1841–42)
- Preceded by: Othni Beardsley & Edward V. Whiton
- Succeeded by: John Hopkins, James Tripp, John M. Capron, & William A. Bartlett

Personal details
- Born: January 4, 1802 Francestown, New Hampshire, U.S.
- Died: March 16, 1875 (aged 73) Neenah, Wisconsin, U.S.
- Resting place: Hickory Grove Cemetery, Spring Prairie, Wisconsin
- Party: Republican
- Spouse: Mary Ann Bell (m. 1834–1875)
- Relatives: Joshua Mills (brother)
- Profession: Physician

Jesse Carr Mills (January 4, 1802 – March 16, 1875) was an American physician, Republican politician, and Wisconsin pioneer. He was a member of the Wisconsin Senate, representing Walworth County during the 1856 and 1857 sessions. He was one of dozens of lawmakers in the 1856 session caught up in the La Crosse and Milwaukee Railroad bribery scheme.

== Biography ==
Jesse C. Mills was born in Francestown, New Hampshire. As a child, he moved with his family to Stockbridge, Vermont, where he received his education.

He studied medicine as a young man, and then moved to Congress Township, Wayne County, Ohio, in 1832. He taught school there for a year, and then moved to the nearby village of Seville, Ohio. After arriving in Seville, he resided for a time in the home of Judge Henry Hosmer. Along with seven other pioneer doctors of Medina County, Ohio, he was a co-founder of the Medina County Medical Society, and served as the first treasurer of the organization.

He came to the Wisconsin Territory in 1839, settling in the southern county of Walworth. He settled a farm in what was then the town of Spring Prairie, but later his section of that town was created as the separate town of Lafeyette. He served as chairman of the Spring Prairie town board in the last session before the separation, in 1842, and was then the first town chairman of Lafayette after its creation in 1843. At the time, serving as a town chairman also made him ex officio a member of the county board of supervisors.

Almost immediately after arriving in the territory, Mills became involved in public affairs. Even before his first election as town chairman, in 1840 he was elected to represent Walworth County in the lower house of the legislature of the Wisconsin Territory. He served in both sessions of the 3rd Wisconsin Territorial Assembly, and subsequently was elected, in 1844, to serve in the 3rd session of the 4th Wisconsin Territorial Assembly.

After his service in the territorial government, he relocated to the town of Elkhorn, Wisconsin (now a city). He subsequently was chosen to serve on the board of the Wisconsin Institute for the Deaf and Dumb, set to be established in the nearby village of Delavan, Wisconsin.

In 1853, he was president of the Walworth County Agricultural Society. Later that year he made his first run for Wisconsin Senate in the 12th State Senate district, running on the Free Soil Party ticket. He was defeated by incumbent Eleazer Wakeley, but returned to run again in 1855, this time as the nominee of the newly established Republican. He won the 1855 election and went on to serve two years in the State Senate.

His time in the State Senate coincided with a massive railroad corruption scandal, which saw dozens of lawmakers in the 1856 session accused of accepting bribes in the form of railroad bonds and stock. An 1858 investigation determined that Mills had received approximately $10,000 worth of the corrupt bonds (about $360,000 adjusted for inflation to 2023). Mills denied that he received the bonds as payment for official actions, but could not deny owning the bonds.

During his second year in the Legislature, 1857, he was elected town chairman of Elkhorn, and again served as a member of the County Board. During that time, he also became active in the establishment of the Elkhorn Bank in 1856, and became president of the bank in 1857. He resigned in July 1858, following the controversy over his involvement in the railroad bribery scandal.

Shortly after this embarrassment, he left Walworth County. He first settled in Burlington, Wisconsin, then moved north to Hortonville, Outagamie County, before finally settling in Neenah, Wisconsin, in 1866, where he operated a drug store for much of the rest of his life. He died in Neenah in 1875.

== Personal life and family ==
Jesse Carr Mills was the fourth of six children born to Jonathan and Susanna (née Davis) Mills. Jonathan Mills was a veteran of the War of 1812. Jesse's older brother, Joshua Mills, was also a physician, and became the 2nd and 5th mayor of Cleveland, Ohio.

While living at the home of Judge Henry Hosmer, in Seville, Ohio, the judge was also tutoring two students. One of his pupils was Mary Ann Bell, whom Jesse Mills married in 1834.

Wisconsin Senate
Preceded by Eleazer Wakeley	Member of the Wisconsin Senate from the 12th district January 7, 1856 – January 4, 1858	Succeeded by John W. Boyd
