= Charles Durkee =

American pioneer and politician (1805–1870)

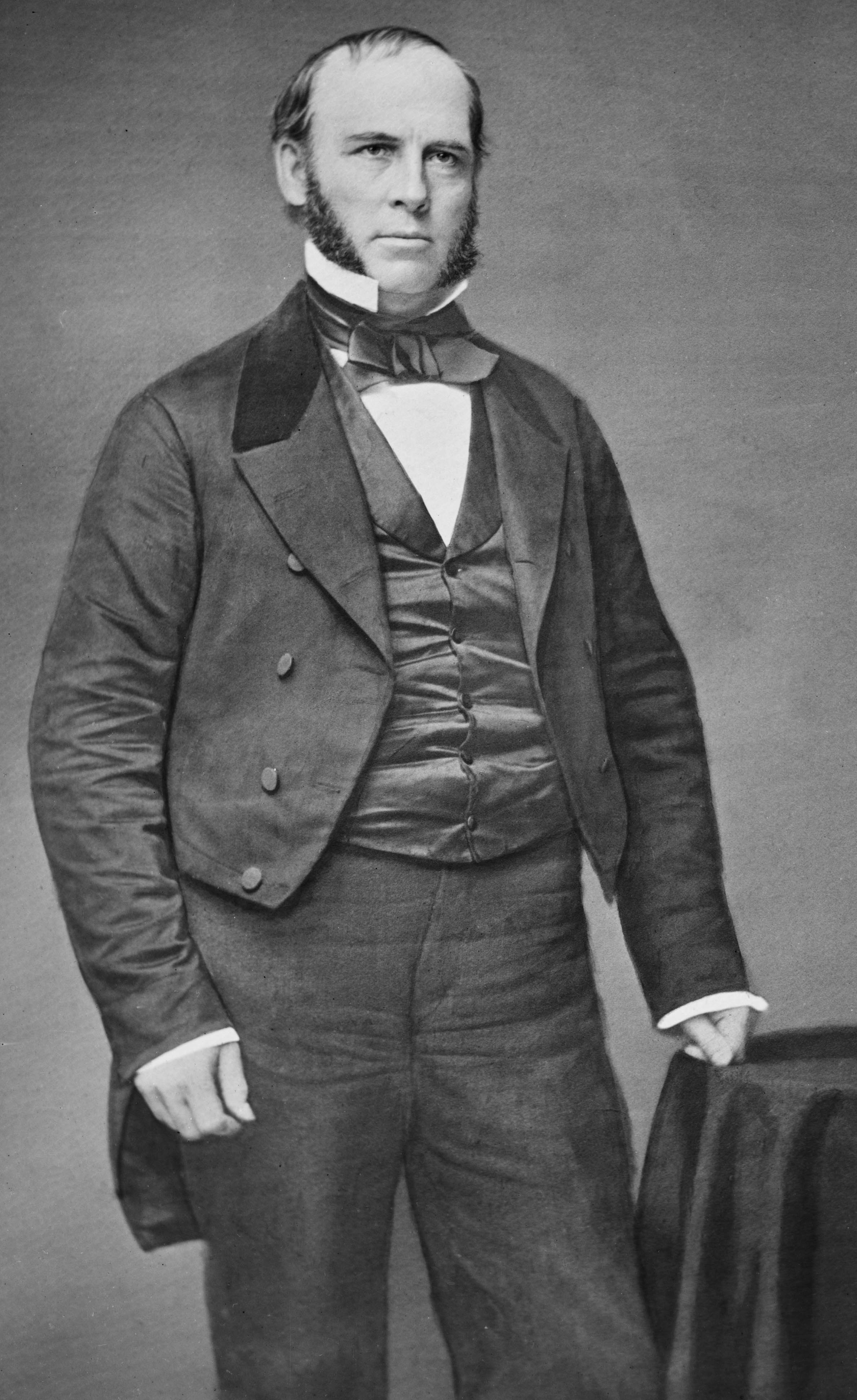

6th Governor of Utah Territory
- In office September 30, 1865 – January 9, 1869
- Appointed by: Abraham Lincoln
- Preceded by: James Duane Doty
- Succeeded by: John Shaffer

United States Senator from Wisconsin
- In office March 4, 1855 – March 3, 1861
- Preceded by: Isaac P. Walker
- Succeeded by: Timothy O. Howe

Member of the U.S. House of Representatives from Wisconsin's 1st district
- In office March 4, 1849 – March 3, 1853
- Preceded by: William P. Lynde
- Succeeded by: Daniel Wells Jr.

Personal details
- Born: December 10, 1805 Royalton, Vermont, U.S.
- Died: January 14, 1870 (aged 64) Omaha, Nebraska, U.S.
- Resting place: Green Ridge Cemetery, Kenosha, Wisconsin
- Party: Republican; Free Soil (1848–1854); Liberty (1844–1848); Democratic (before 1844)
- Spouses: Catherine Putnam Dana (m. 1836; died 1838); Caroline Lake (m. 1840–1870)
- Children: Charles Durkee; (b. 1843; died 1847); Harvey Durkee; (b: 1853; died 1858)

Charles H. Durkee (December 10, 1805 – January 14, 1870) was an American politician, activist, and Wisconsin pioneer. He represented Wisconsin as a United States senator from 1855 to 1861, and served two terms in the U.S. House of Representatives (1849–1853). Later in life he was appointed governor of the Utah Territory, serving from 1865 to 1869. Before his political career, Durkee was one of the founders of Kenosha, Wisconsin; he was a vehement advocate for temperance and abolition, though he personally struggled with alcoholism.

He originally became involved in politics as a member of the Democratic Party, and was elected to the 1st Wisconsin Territorial Assembly on the Democratic ticket. In the 1840s he became a leader in Wisconsin of the short-lived Liberty Party, which advocated for the abolition of slavery. In 1848, the Liberty Party merged with other abolitionist and anti-slavery Democrats into the Free Soil Party, and Durkee was elected to his two terms in the U.S. House on the Free Soil ticket. In 1854, the Free Soil Party merged with much of the Whig Party to become the Republican Party, and a few months later Durkee became the first Republican U.S. senator from Wisconsin.

== Early life ==
Durkee was born in Royalton, Vermont. He became a merchant and moved to the Wisconsin Territory in 1836. There he became involved in agriculture and lumbering, and was a founder of the town of Southport (later Kenosha, Wisconsin). Land he once owned in Kenosha is now part of the Library Park Historic District.

== Career ==
He entered politics, serving two terms in the Wisconsin Territorial Legislature. Originally a Democrat, he became a member first of the Liberty Party and then of the Free Soil Party and was elected to the United States House of Representatives in 1848 as part of Wisconsin's first full congressional delegation. He served in the House for two terms as part of the 31st and the 32nd Congresses from March 4, 1849, till March 3, 1853, representing Wisconsin's 1st congressional district. In 1854, he switched to the newly formed Republican Party and was elected to the United States Senate by the Wisconsin State Legislature. He served for one term, from 1855 to 1861. In 1865 he became governor of the Utah Territory, and served in that position until 1869 when he resigned because of ill health. He died in Omaha, Nebraska while returning home.

== Tributes ==
A street in the city of Appleton, Wisconsin, is named for him. An elementary school in Kenosha, Wisconsin, bore his name for many years. It was demolished in 2008.

He gave a speech at the hammering of the Golden Spike in Promontory, Utah, on May 10, 1869, connecting the Union Pacific tracks to the Central Pacific Railroad.

His former home, which later became an Episcopal school for girls and is now known as Kemper Hall, is listed on the National Register of Historic Places.

== Electoral history ==
=== U.S. Senate (1855) ===
United States Senate Election in Wisconsin, 1855
Party	Candidate	Votes	%	±%
8th Vote of the 8th Wisconsin Legislature, February 1, 1855
Republican	Charles Durkee	54	50.47%	
Democratic	Byron Kilbourn	39	35.45%	
Democratic	Charles Dunn	5	4.67%	
Republican	James Duane Doty	4	3.74%	
Democratic	David Agry	2	1.87%	
Democratic	Harrison Carroll Hobart	2	1.87%	
Republican	James McMillan Shafter	1	0.93%	
Plurality		15	14.02%	
Total votes		107	100.0%	
Republican gain from Democratic				

U.S. House of Representatives
Preceded by William Pitt Lynde	Member of the U.S. House of Representatives from Wisconsin's 1st congressional district March 4, 1849 – March 3, 1853	Succeeded by Daniel Wells Jr.
U.S. Senate
Preceded by Isaac P. Walker	United States Senator (Class 3) from Wisconsin; March 4, 1855 – March 3, 1861; Served alongside: Henry Dodge, James R. Doolittle	Succeeded by Timothy O. Howe
Political offices
Preceded by James Duane Doty	Governor of Utah Territory; September 30, 1865 – January 9, 1869	Succeeded by John Shaffer
