= Orris Pratt =

American politician

Orris Pratt (September 16, 1837 – July 27, 1906) was a member of the Wisconsin State Assembly, serving one term. Born in Michigan, he moved to Wisconsin as a child with his family. He followed his father into farming and politics.

== Biography ==
Orris Pratt was born on September 18, 1837, in White Pigeon, Michigan. His parents were Samuel Pratt and his wife. The family moved to Wisconsin, where they settled in what became Spring Prairie, and his parents developed a farm. Samuel Pratt was elected as a member of the Assembly and of the Wisconsin State Senate.

The younger Pratt followed his father into farming. He married and had a family, and farmed in Spring Prairie.

== Political career ==
Pratt was elected as a member of the Assembly from Spring Prairie in 1883. Previously, he had chaired the town board (similar to city council) of Spring Prairie in 1881 and 1882. He was a Republican.
