= Gaylord Graves =

19th century American politician

Member of the Wisconsin State Assembly from the Walworth 1st district
- In office June 5, 1848 – January 1, 1849
- Preceded by: Position established
- Succeeded by: Samuel Pratt

Member of the House of Representatives of the Wisconsin Territory from Walworth County
- In office January 5, 1846 – January 4, 1847 Serving with Caleb Croswell & Warren Earl
- Preceded by: Stephen Field, Jesse C. Mills, Salmon Thomas, & Jesse Moore
- Succeeded by: Charles A. Bronson & Palmer Gardiner

Personal details
- Born: May 22, 1804 Richfield Springs, New York, US
- Died: August 29, 1889 (aged 85) Northwood, Iowa, US
- Resting place: Sunset Rest Cemetery, Northwood, Iowa
- Party: Democratic
- Spouses: Nancy Tuckerman (m. 1824; died 1845); Keziah Freeman (m. 1845; died 1846); Mary Ann (Wheeler) Pike (m. 1848–1889)
- Children: 5
- Occupation: Farmer

Gaylord Graves (May 22, 1804 – August 29, 1889) was an American farmer, politician, and Wisconsin pioneer. He was a member of the first session of the Wisconsin State Assembly, representing the northeast corner of Walworth County.

== Biography ==
Graves was born on May 22, 1804, in Richfield Springs, New York. He received a common school education and, at age 18, went to work as a farm hand. In 1824, he had gathered enough money to purchase a small farm in northern New York. After several unproductive years farming, he sought new opportunities in the west. He moved first to Oswego, New York, then traveled to Chicago, by way of Michigan. Finally, he went by foot into the Wisconsin Territory and established a claim in the town of Spring Prairie.

In February 1838, Graves was appointed justice of the peace by Governor Henry Dodge. He went on to serve more than a decade in that role. During those years he was also elected to the Walworth County board of supervisors and the House of Representatives of the Wisconsin Territory, running on the Democratic Party ticket. When Wisconsin achieved statehood in 1848, Graves was elected to the first session of the Wisconsin State Assembly as the representative of Walworth County's 1st Assembly district, which then comprised the northeast corner of the county.

In 1855, Graves moved to Iowa and settled near Des Moines. In 1859, he settled in Emmet County, Iowa. He died on August 29, 1889, in Northwood, Iowa.

== Personal life and family ==
Graves was married three times. He married his first wife, Nancy Tuckerman, on January 18, 1824. They had two sons and three daughters before her death due to typhoid fever in January 1845. Near the end of the year, Graves remarried with Keziah Freeman, but she died the next year of Tuberculosis. On March 15, 1848, he married his third and final wife, Mary Ann Pike (née Wheeler), the widow of Colonel Calvin Pike.

Wisconsin State Assembly
New state government	Member of the Wisconsin State Assembly from the Walworth 1st district June 5, 1848 – January 1, 1849	Succeeded by Samuel Pratt
