= George Gale (Wisconsin politician) =

American lawyer, politician, judge

George W. Gale
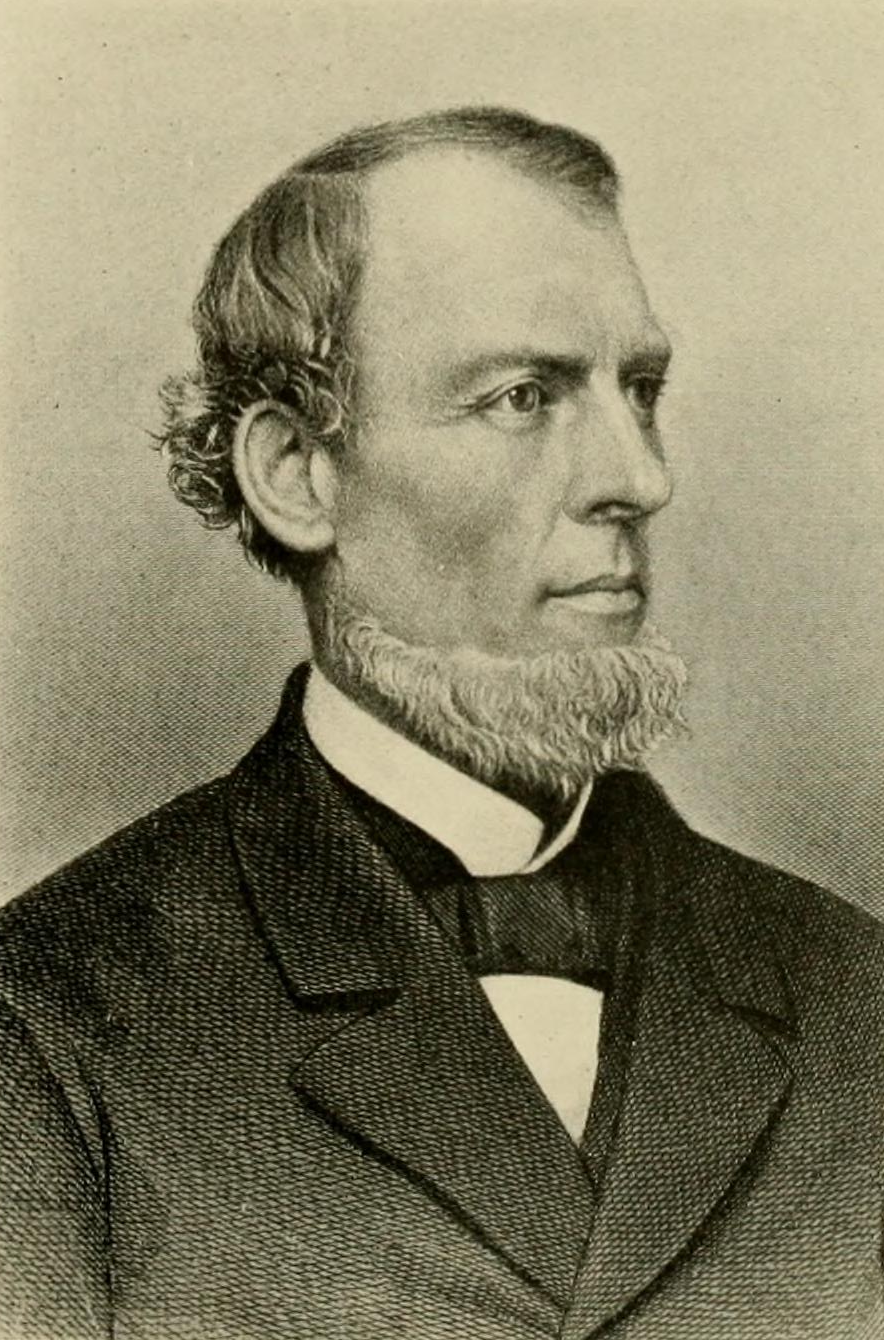

Wisconsin Circuit Court Judge for the 6th Circuit
- In office January 1, 1857 – December 31, 1862
- Preceded by: Wiram Knowlton
- Succeeded by: Edwin Flint

County Judge of La Crosse County, Wisconsin
- In office January 1, 1852 – January 1, 1854
- Preceded by: Timothy Burns
- Succeeded by: R. C. Van Rensselaer

Member of the Wisconsin Senate from the 14th district
- In office January 1, 1850 – January 1, 1852
- Preceded by: John W. Boyd
- Succeeded by: Eleazer Wakeley

Chairman of the Walworth County Board of Supervisors
- In office January 1, 1847 – January 1, 1849
- Preceded by: John A. Farnum
- Succeeded by: Adam E. Ray

Personal details
- Born: November 30, 1816 Burlington, Vermont, U.S.
- Died: April 18, 1868 (aged 51) Galesville, Wisconsin, U.S.
- Cause of death: Tuberculosis
- Resting place: Gale College Cemetery; Galesville, Wisconsin
- Party: Democratic (after 1851); Free Soil (1848–1851); Liberty (1846–1848)
- Spouse: Gertrude Young (m. 1844–1868)
- Children: George Gale^{(b. 1845; died 1937)}; William Gale^{(b. 1848; died 1903)}; Emma (Arnold)
- Profession: lawyer, judge

Military service
- Allegiance: United States
- Branch/service: Wisconsin Militia
- Rank: Brigadier General

George W. Gale (November 30, 1816 – April 18, 1868) was an American lawyer, judge, politician, and Wisconsin pioneer. He served as a Wisconsin circuit court judge and as a member of the Wisconsin State Senate. He was the founder of Galesville, Wisconsin, and Gale College, and was a driving force behind the creation of Trempealeau County, Wisconsin.

== Early life and education ==
Born in Burlington, Vermont, Gale grew up working on his father's farm. He received a common school education and, in March 1839, he began studying law at Waterbury Center, Vermont. While at Waterbury, he also worked as postmaster, and, in 1841, was admitted to the Vermont Bar.

== Career ==
Shortly after achieving the Bar, he left Vermont for the Wisconsin Territory. He settled at Elkhorn, Walworth County, where he established a law practice. He became involved in the abolition movement as a member of the Liberty Party, and, in 1845, he founded the Elkhorn Western Star, a newspaper from the Liberty Party perspective, and was editor and publisher of the paper for a year. He also published the "Wisconsin Form Book" (Forms, with Notes and References, Adapted to the Statutes of Wisconsin) in 1846, and published revised editions in 1848, 1850, and 1856. The Form Book was widely distributed in the early state as a manual for attorneys, sheriffs, local officials, and justices of the peace, with standardized language and instructions for contracts and legal documents.

In 1847, he was elected district attorney for Walworth County and was elected to represent Walworth County as a delegate to Wisconsin's 2nd constitutional convention. The second convention was necessary because the constitution produced by the first convention failed to win the approval of the voters. Gale won recognition at the convention as a leading member of the judiciary committee and helped frame the Constitution of Wisconsin, which was approved and ratified in 1848. Following the convention, Gale took up his role as district attorney, which he fulfilled until 1848.

In 1849, Gale was elected as a Free Soil Democrat to the Wisconsin State Senate, serving in the 1850 and 1851 sessions. During the 1851 session, Gale purchased a significant amount of land near La Crosse, Wisconsin, and located there after the session. He was quickly elected county judge of La Crosse County in a special election that September. Also in 1851, Gale was appointed Brigadier General of the 2nd Brigade, 2nd Division of the Wisconsin Militia by Governor Nelson Dewey.

Gale became a member of the Democratic Party while living at La Crosse. He was a prominent voice in the Democratic Party of Wisconsin at state conventions of this era and an outspoken opponent of the Know Nothing movement.

Also during this time, Gale began to advocate for the establishment of a college or academy of higher learning in the area, but was unable to sway the voters of La Crosse. In response, in 1853, Gale purchased about 2,000 acres of land about 15 miles north of La Crosse. There, he established a village on Beaver Creek which he named Galesville. During the 1854 session of the Wisconsin Legislature, Gale successfully lobbied for the creation of a new county around his settlement, with land previously allocated to La Crosse, Jackson, and Buffalo counties—Trempe a l'eau (Trempealeau) County (1854 Wisc. Act 2). At this new settlement, Gale obtained a charter for his school and held the first class at the local courthouse with sixteen students, including his son George Jr. A board of trustees was organized in 1855, and Galesville University began construction in 1858 on a tract of 40 acres donated by Gale. Gale continued as President of the University until the first class of students graduated in 1865, at which time he turned over responsibility.

In April 1856, Gale was elected Wisconsin circuit court judge in the 6th circuit–then comprising the counties of Buffalo, Clark, Jackson, La Crosse, Monroe, Trempealeau, Vernon, and Crawford.

By law, Gale's circuit court term began on the first Monday of January 1857 and expired the first Monday of January 1863. However, during the 1861 session of the Legislature, a law was passed to legislate him out of his seat in the sixth circuit and instead make him judge of the newly-created eleventh district. The Legislature deemed the seat vacant and the Governor, Alexander Randall, appointed state representative Isaac E. Messmore to the judgeship on April 10, 1861. A legal battle ensued, in which Gale was supported by the Attorney General of Wisconsin, James Henry Howe. The Wisconsin Supreme Court ruled on Gale's favor in the case State ex rel. Attorney General v. Messmore, deeming Messmore's appointment invalid. Gale completed his term, serving through the end of 1862.

He had suffered for several years from breathing difficulty, and his health began to fail in the summer of 1862. He began taking trips around the South and West of the country in an attempt to revitalize his health, but largely retired from public life. During these final years, he wrote a number of works of historical study, including History of the Chippewa Nation of Indians, Genealogical History of the Gale Family in England and in the United States, and Upper Mississippi. He died of Tuberculosis at his home in Galesville, in 1868.

== Personal life and family ==
George Gale was the son of Peter Gale and Hannah Gale (née Tottingham). His father was a minuteman with the Vermont Militia in the War of 1812, his grandfather, also named Peter, had served in the Continental Army in the American Revolutionary War. His mother was a descendant of Puritan colonists at the Massachusetts Bay Colony.

George Gale married Gertrude Young of Schenectady, New York, in December 1844. They had three children together—George Jr., William, and Helen. George Jr. and William followed their father into the legal profession, Helen married H. J. Arnold, a pharmacist in Kansas City. Gale was survived by his wife and all three children.

== Published works ==
- Gale, George (1846). Forms, with Notes and References, Adapted to the Statutes of Wisconsin. Elkhorn, Wisconsin: F. A. Utter.
- Gale, George (1867). Upper Mississippi: or Historical Sketches of the Mound-Builders, the Indian Tribes, and the Progress of Civilization in the North-West; from A.D. 1600 to the Present Time. Chicago: Clarke and Company.

Wisconsin Senate
Preceded by John W. Boyd	Member of the Wisconsin Senate from the 14th district January 1, 1850 – January 1, 1852	Succeeded by Eleazer Wakeley
Legal offices
Preceded by Timothy Burns	County Judge of La Crosse County, Wisconsin; January 1, 1852 – January 1, 1854	Succeeded by R. C. Van Rensselaer
Preceded by Wiram Knowlton	Wisconsin Circuit Court Judge for the 6th Circuit; June 1, 1856 – December 31, 1862	Succeeded by Edwin Flint
