= Elizabeth Baird (writer) =

American writer (1810–1890)

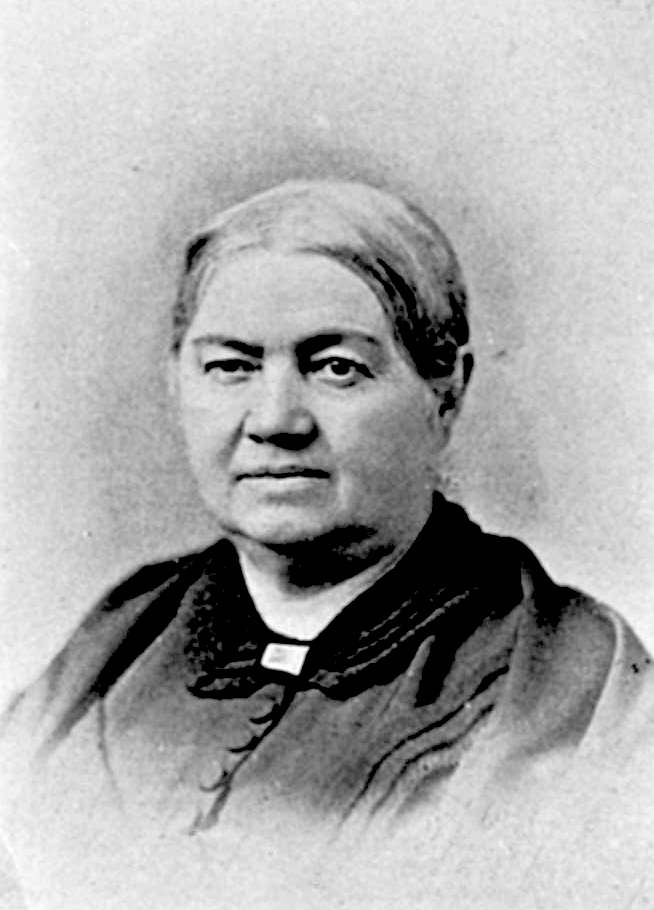
- Born: Elizabeth Thérèse Fisher; April 24, 1810; Prairie du Chien, Illinois Territory, U.S
- Died: November 5, 1890 (aged 80); Green Bay, Wisconsin, U.S
- Occupation: writer

Elizabeth Thérèse Baird (April 24, 1810 – November 5, 1890) was an early resident of Wisconsin and one of the first writers to describe pioneer life in the state.

== Early life ==
Baird, born Elizabeth Thérèse Fisher, was born in Prairie du Chien then in Illinois Territory but moved to Mackinac Island, Michigan Territory with her mother two years later. Her father, Henry Monroe Fisher, was a fur trader and her mother, Marie Ann Lasaliere, had Odawa ancestry. Lasaliere, a grand-niece of fur trader Magdelaine Laframboise, ran a school for the children of other fur traders; Baird met her future husband, Henry S. Baird, while he was teaching at the school.

== Career ==
The couple married while Elizabeth was only 14 years old and moved to Green Bay, then in Michigan Territory shortly thereafter.

The Bairds were among the early settlers of the growing settlement of Green Bay, and Henry soon became the territory's first practicing attorney. Elizabeth spoke French and Odawa due to her family's connections to the fur trade, and she learned English shortly after moving to Green Bay. Her language skills allowed her both to translate for her husband's clients and interact in the American, British, French, and Native American communities in Green Bay, making her a prominent socialite in the settlement. The couple moved to a farm in 1832; Elizabeth managed the farm while also raising the couple's four daughters.

Later in her life, Baird wrote several accounts of her travels and experiences as an early Wisconsin pioneer. She initially published her works in the Green Bay State Gazette; they were later republished in the Wisconsin Historical Collections as the Reminiscences of Life in Territorial Wisconsin. Her writings were among the first to describe pioneer life in Wisconsin and became a valuable source of information on the period for later scholars.

She lived in Green Bay for the rest of her life, where she died in 1890.
