= Oscar Bartlett =

American politician

Oscar F. Bartlett

Member of the Wisconsin Senate from the 12th district
- In office January 1, 1860 – January 1, 1862
- Preceded by: John W. Boyd
- Succeeded by: Wyman Spooner

Member of the Wisconsin State Assembly from the Walworth 3rd district
- In office January 1, 1853 – January 1, 1855
- Preceded by: Timothy H. Fellows
- Succeeded by: Samuel Pratt

Personal details
- Born: October 2, 1823 Victory, Cayuga County, New York, U.S.
- Died: August 1905 (aged 81) Meridian, New York, U.S.
- Party: Republican; Free Soil (before 1855)
- Spouses: Maria Holyoke (m. 1864; died 1864); Maria (Bassett) Holyoke (m. 1869)
- Children: with Maria Holyoke; Maria R. (Kingsley)^{(b. 1864; died 1890)}; with Maria Bassett; John M. Bartlett^{(died age 19)}
- Parents: Rev. John Milton Bartlett (father); Hannah (Earl) Bartlett (mother)

Military service
- Allegiance: United States
- Branch/service: United States Volunteers; Union Army
- Years of service: 1861–1865
- Rank: Chief Surgeon
- Unit: 6th Reg. Wis. Vol. Infantry; 3rd Reg. Wis. Vol. Infantry
- Battles/wars: American Civil War

Oscar F. Bartlett, M.D., (October 2, 1823 – August 10, 1905) was an American teacher, farm laborer, physician, and politician from Cayuga County, New York. He served as a Union Army Surgeon during the American Civil War and represented Walworth County for two years each in the Wisconsin State Senate and Wisconsin State Assembly. He was a member of the Free Soil Party until its merger to create the Republican Party, and was thereafter a liberal Republican.

== Background ==
Born October 2, 1823, in Victory, New York, one of ten children of Rev. John Milton Bartlett (a former Baptist who joined the Disciples of Christ) and Hannah (Earl) Bartlett. He studied in the local schools, doing well enough that he soon became a teacher himself in the village of Cato, a profession he would practice for ten years. He sustained himself as a farm laborer and teacher, and at the age of fifteen also began to study medicine in the office of a local physician, Dr. Robert Treat Payne.

== In Wisconsin ==
In 1842, Bartlett moved to Wisconsin, working first as a farm laborer in Delavan, then teaching in Racine and working as a retail clerk in a general store, before moving on to East Troy, in Walworth County. He taught school there for some time; then resumed his medical studies by attending lectures at Rush Medical College in Chicago and continuing his medical apprenticeship with a Chicago physician, Dr. N. S. Davis. He then went into medical practice in East Troy.

=== Legislative service ===
In 1852, he was elected to the Assembly's third Walworth County district (East Troy and Spring Prairie) as a Freesoiler, succeeding fellow Freesoiler Joel H. Cooper (who was not a candidate for re-election). He was assigned to the standing committees on engrossed bills, and on medical colleges and medical societies. He was re-elected in 1853, but in the next session he was succeeded by Samuel Pratt (himself a Freesoiler turned Republican). He continued in the practice of medicine.

In 1859, he was elected to the Wisconsin Senate as a Republican, succeeding Republican John W. Boyd. In 1861, rather than seek re-election, he joined the Union Army and became a military surgeon in the American Civil War. He was succeeded by fellow Republican Wyman Spooner.

=== The Civil War and after ===
He initially joined the 6th Wisconsin Infantry Regiment, for which he was Assistant Surgeon; then moved on to the 3rd Wisconsin Infantry, for which he became a chief surgeon. He was married in Syracuse, New York, on January 19, 1864, to Maria Holyoke, who died later that same year. Bartlett was compelled to resign after he became seriously ill in January 1865. He returned to his home but was crippled by rheumatism to such an extent that he could not practice medicine for some years.

== Return to Cayuga County ==
In 1868 he returned to Cato, New York, setting up practice in the nearby village of Meridian. On May 25, 1869, he remarried, to Maria (Bassett) Holyoke, the widow of his first wife's brother. She had two children from her previous marriage, and together they would have one son, John, who would not live past the age of nineteen. Both of them were active in public life. (Bartlett had remained loyal to the Republican Party).

He died in August of 1905, having for some time been the oldest practicing physician in town.
