= Henry S. Baird =

Wisconsin pioneer, lawyer, and politician

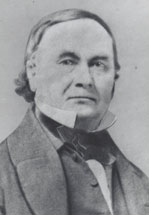
- Baird in 1861

Chairman of the Board of Supervisors of Brown County, Wisconsin
- In office April 1867 – April 1870
- Preceded by: John Last
- Succeeded by: Frederick S. Ellis
- In office April 1861 – April 1864
- Preceded by: John Last
- Succeeded by: John Last

7th Mayor of Green Bay, Wisconsin
- In office April 1861 – April 1863
- Preceded by: E. H. Ellis
- Succeeded by: Burley Follett

1st Attorney General of Wisconsin Territory
- In office December 1836 – December 1839
- Appointed by: Henry Dodge
- Preceded by: Position Established
- Succeeded by: Horatio N. Wells

1st President of the Council of the Wisconsin Territory
- In office October 25, 1836 – November 6, 1837
- Preceded by: Position Established
- Succeeded by: Arthur B. Ingraham

Member of the Council of the Wisconsin Territory for Brown County
- In office October 25, 1836 – November 6, 1837
- Preceded by: Position Established
- Succeeded by: Joseph Dickinson

Personal details
- Born: Henry Samuel Baird Jr. May 16, 1800 Dublin, Ireland
- Died: April 30, 1875 (aged 74) Fontenoy, Wisconsin, U.S.
- Resting place: Woodlawn Cemetery; Green Bay, Wisconsin
- Party: Whig
- Spouse: Elizabeth Thérèse Fisher (m. 1824)
- Children: Eliza A. (Baker)^{(b. 1825; died 1915)}; Emilie Virginia Baird^{(b. 1829; died 1844)}; Mary Elizabeth Baird^{(b. 1831; died 1833)}; Louise Sophia (Favill)^{(b. 1833; died 1911)}
- Parents: Henry Samuel Baird (father); Ann (Burnside) Baird (mother)
- Occupation: lawyer

Military service
- Allegiance: United States
- Branch/service: Michigan Territorial Militia
- Years of service: 1832
- Rank: Quartermaster
- Battles/wars: Black Hawk War

Henry Samuel Baird Jr. (May 16, 1800 – April 30, 1875) was an Irish American immigrant, Wisconsin pioneer, lawyer, and politician. He was the first Attorney General of the Wisconsin Territory, appointed by territorial governor Henry Dodge. He is known as "Father of the Wisconsin Bar," and was said to be the first practicing lawyer in the Wisconsin Territory.

== Biography ==
Born in Dublin, Ireland, Baird moved with his family, at age five, to Pittsburgh, Pennsylvania. He worked in various law firms in Ohio and Pennsylvania—including the law firm of the future governor of Ohio Reuben Wood. Baird moved to Mackinac Island, in the Michigan Territory, in 1822, where he became a teacher. He moved to Green Bay in 1824, which, at the time, was also part of the Michigan Territory.

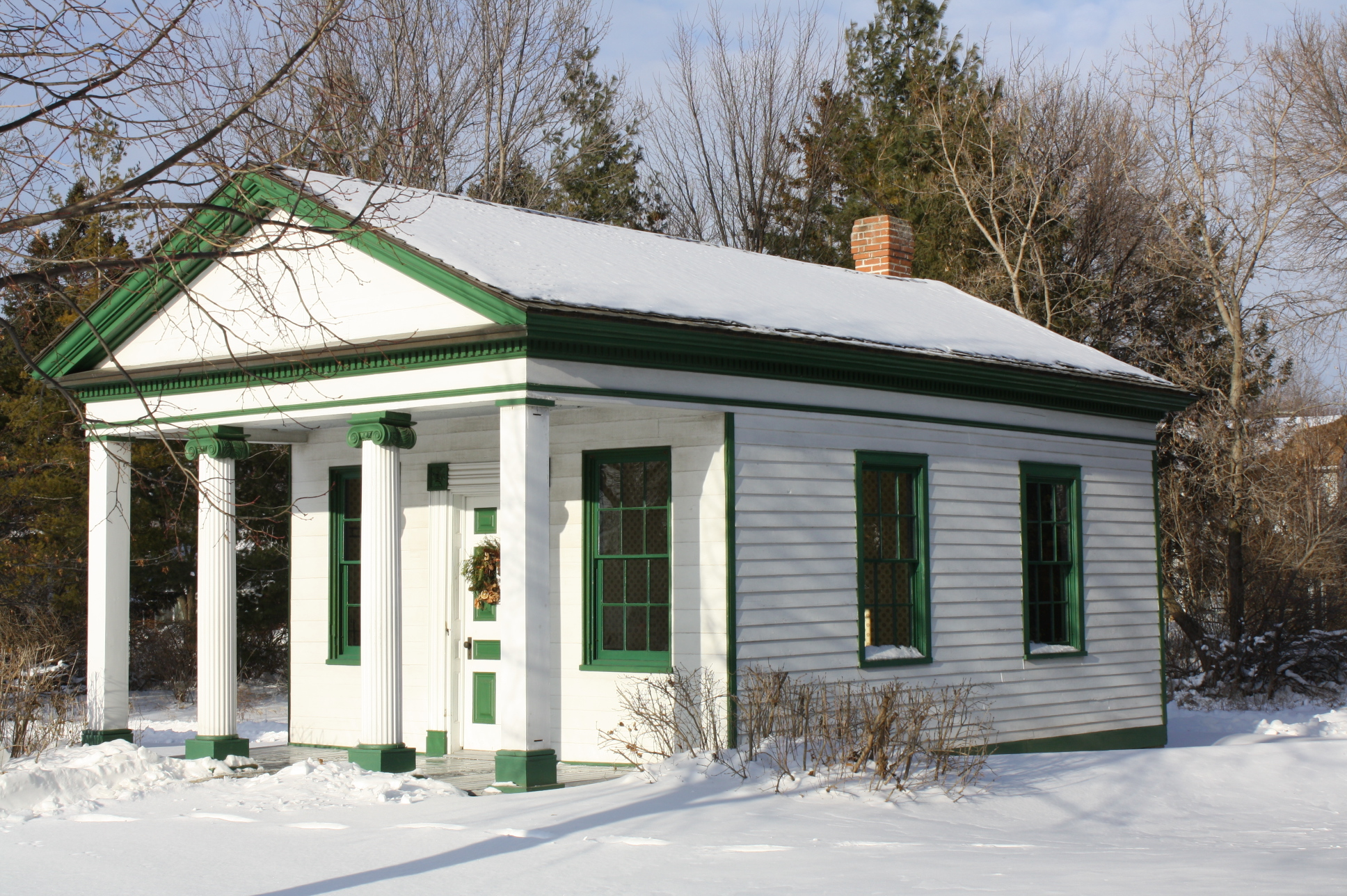
Baird Law Office at Heritage Hill

In Green Bay, Baird was admitted to the bar in a special ceremony in the courtroom of territorial judge James Duane Doty, and became the first practicing attorney in what would become the Wisconsin Territory. Baird was involved with Indian affairs, negotiating land transactions as a counsel for the Menominee and Ho-Chunk tribes in 1830, he volunteered as a quartermaster with the militia during the Black Hawk War in 1832, and was secretary to U.S. negotiator Henry Dodge at the Treaty of the Cedars in 1836, and was secretary to the council at Lake Poygan in 1848; Baird also served in the Wisconsin Territorial Council, the upper house of the Wisconsin Territorial Legislature, and was the first president of the territorial council; he also served in the first Wisconsin Constitutional Convention of 1846. After Wisconsin statehood, he was the Whig Party nominee for Governor of Wisconsin in 1853, losing badly (this would be the last Wisconsin gubernatorial election in which there was a Whig candidate on the ballot). He served as mayor of Green Bay for two terms, in 1861 and 1862.

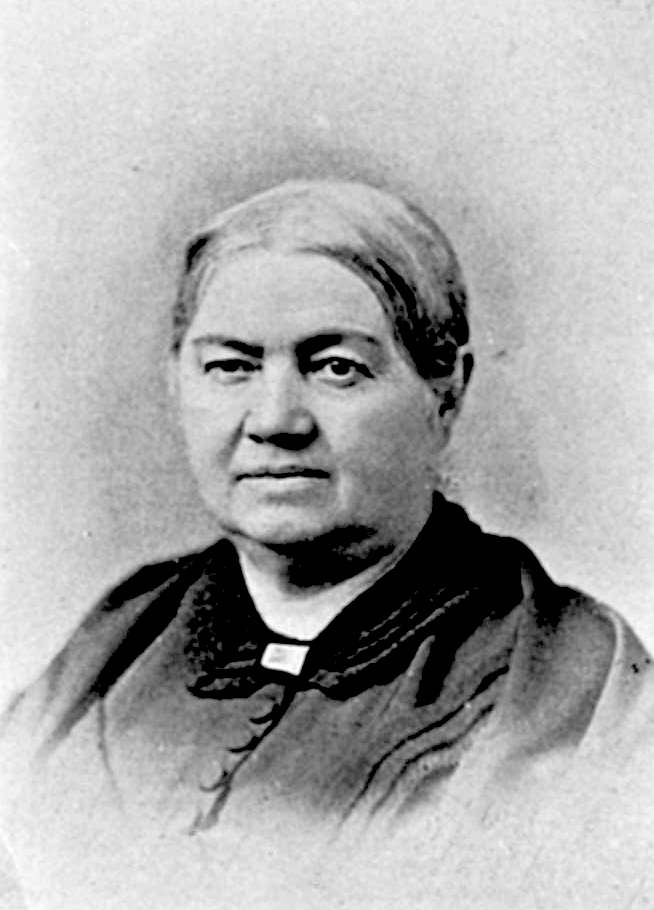
Elizabeth Baird

== Family and personal life ==
On August 12, 1824, Henry Baird married 14-year-old Elizabeth Fisher, who had been his favorite student. Elizabeth was born in Prairie du Chien in southwest Wisconsin and had moved with her mother to Mackinac Island as a toddler. She was the child of a British fur trader and a French-Ottawa mother and spoke several languages. Baird brought his wife from Mackinac Island, by ship, to Green Bay. Elizabeth's skill at translation and her family connections to the American Indian communities made their home a hub for social life in the territory and contributed to her husband's political success. Elizabeth later wrote of her life in the territory in Reminscences of Life in Territorial Wisconsin. Henry and Elizabeth had four daughters, with two surviving to adulthood.

Henry's law office, the Baird Law Office, is a small Greek Revival building that he purchased in 1841. The building was moved and is preserved at Heritage Hill State Park.

== Electoral history ==
=== Wisconsin Attorney General (1848) ===
Wisconsin Attorney General Election, 1848
Party	Candidate	Votes	%	±%
General Election, May 8, 1848
Democratic	James S. Brown	17,788	56.00%	
Whig	Henry S. Baird	13,975	44.00%	
Plurality		3,813	12.00%	
Total votes		31,763	100.0%	
Democratic win (new seat)				

=== Wisconsin Governor (1853) ===
Wisconsin Gubernatorial Election, 1853
Party	Candidate	Votes	%	±%
General Election, November 8, 1853
Democratic	William A. Barstow	30,405	54.60%	+5.24%
Free Soil	Edward D. Holton	21,886	39.31%	
Whig	Henry S. Baird	3,304	5.93%	−44.57%
	Scattering	88	0.16%	
Plurality		8,519	15.30%	+14.15%
Total votes		55,683	100.0%	+26.01%
Democratic gain from Whig		Swing	49.82%	

Party political offices
New state	Whig nominee for Attorney General of Wisconsin; 1848	Succeeded by Moses B. Butterfield
Preceded by Leonard J. Farwell	Whig nominee for Governor of Wisconsin; 1853	Party dissolved
Political offices
Preceded by E. H. Ellis	Mayor of Green Bay, Wisconsin; April 1861 – April 1863	Succeeded by Burley Follett
Legal offices
New territory	Attorney General of the Wisconsin Territory; 1836 – 1839	Succeeded by Horatio N. Wells
