= Fayette P. Arnold =

American politician

Fayette P. Arnold was a member of the Wisconsin State Assembly.

Arnold was born near Hubbardton, Vermont, the date seems to be disputed. In 1850, he moved to Sharon, Walworth County, Wisconsin. He died on January 9, 1872. Arnold's son, Cassius, later became Town Treasurer of Sharon.

== Career ==
Arnold was a member of the Assembly during the 1862 session. In addition, he was a member of the county board of Walworth County, Wisconsin. He was a Republican.
