= John W. Boyd (Wisconsin politician) =

American politician

Member of the Wisconsin Senate from the 12th district
- In office January 1, 1858 – January 1, 1860
- Preceded by: Jesse C. Mills
- Succeeded by: Oscar Bartlett

Member of the Wisconsin Senate from the 14th district
- In office June 5, 1848 – January 1, 1850
- Preceded by: Position established
- Succeeded by: George Gale

Personal details
- Born: September 15, 1811 Charlton, New York, U.S.
- Died: January 28, 1892 (aged 80) Linn, Wisconsin, U.S.
- Resting place: Pioneer Cemetery, Lake Geneva, Wisconsin
- Party: Republican; Democratic (before 1855)
- Spouses: first wife (died); Wealtha Hanna Hathaway (m. 1842–1855); Persis Annette Buell (m. 1858–1892)
- Children: Helen (Turner)^{(b. 1845; died 1912)}; Carolyn Hathaway Boyd^{(b. 1848; died 1882)}

Military service
- Allegiance: United States
- Branch/service: Wisconsin Territorial Militia
- Rank: Major General

John William Boyd (September 15, 1811 – January 28, 1892) was an American businessman and politician. He served four sessions in the Wisconsin State Senate (1848, 1849, 1858, 1859) representing Walworth County.

== Biography ==
Boyd was born on September 15, 1811, in Charlton, New York. Boyd's father had been a member of the New York legislature. He moved to Wisconsin in 1844, settling in Geneva, Wisconsin. Boyd married three times. His first wife died after a year of marriage. In 1842, he married Wealthy H. Hathaway. They had three children before she died. In 1858, he married Persis A. Buell. They also had three children. He was a Congregationalist and was a member of the Sons of Temperance. Boyd suffered a stroke on January 24, 1892, and died four days later at his home in Linn, Wisconsin.

== Career ==
Boyd was a member of the Senate twice. First, from 1848 to 1849, as a Democrat; and second, from 1858 to 1859, as a Republican.

Wisconsin Senate
New state government	Member of the Wisconsin Senate from the 14th district June 5, 1848 – January 7, 1850	Succeeded by George Gale
Preceded by Jesse C. Mills	Member of the Wisconsin Senate from the 12th district January 4, 1858 – January 2, 1860	Succeeded by Oscar Bartlett
