= Alexander O. Babcock =

American politician

Alexander O. Babcock (December 21, 1816 – July 3, 1874) was a member of the Wisconsin State Assembly.

== Biography ==
A native of Homer, New York, Babcock moved to East Troy, Wisconsin in 1843. He died in 1874.

== Career ==
Babcock was a member of the Assembly in 1850. Additionally, he was a justice of the peace, Chairman of the Walworth County, Wisconsin Board of Supervisors and Attorney of Walworth County. He was a member of the Whig Party.
