= Solmous Wakeley =

American politician

Member of the Wisconsin State Assembly from the Walworth 4th district
- In office January 1, 1857 – January 1, 1858
- Preceded by: Asa W. Farr
- Succeeded by: James Baker

Member of the Wisconsin State Assembly from the Walworth 1st district
- In office January 1, 1855 – January 1, 1856
- Preceded by: Anderson Whiting
- Succeeded by: James Lauderdale

Personal details
- Born: March 17, 1794 New Milford, Connecticut
- Died: January 12, 1867 (aged 72) Whitewater, Wisconsin
- Resting place: Oak Grove Cemetery; Whitewater, Wisconsin
- Party: Republican
- Spouses: Hannah Thompson; (died 1874)
- Children: Eleazer Wakeley^{(b. 1822; died 1912)}; Lucy A. (Winchester)^{(b. 1826; died 1861)}; Charles T. Wakeley^{(b. 1827; died 1895)}; William Pitt Wakeley^{(b. 1830; died 1848)}

Solmous 'Solomon' Wakeley (March 17, 1794 – January 12, 1867) was a pioneer Wisconsin legislator. He served two terms in the Wisconsin State Assembly and was a delegate to the first Wisconsin constitutional convention for Walworth County.

== Biography ==
Born in New Milford, Connecticut, Wakeley settled in Homer, New York, then Pennsylvania, Ohio, and finally Whitewater, Wisconsin. He served in the first Wisconsin Constitutional Convention of 1846. He served in the Wisconsin State Assembly in 1855, 1857. One of his sons was Judge Eleazer Wakeley, who also served in the Wisconsin Legislature before becoming a judge in Nebraska.
