= John W. Whelan =

American politician

John W. Whelan (November 1, 1845 – June 3, 1906) was an American politician, lawyer, and farmer. He was a member of the Wisconsin State Assembly and Wisconsin State Senate.

Born in Waukesha, Wisconsin, Whelan graduated from University of Wisconsin in 1871. He lived in Fort Worth, Texas and New Orleans. He returned to Wisconsin in 1875 and taught at a school in Eau Claire, Wisconsin. He studied law in Eau Claire and was admitted to the Wisconsin bar in 1876. Whelan practiced law in Mondovi, Buffalo County, Wisconsin. Whelan was a farmer and also served as president of the First Bank of Mondovi. Whelan served on the Buffalo County Board of Supervisors and was the chairman of the county board. In 1889, Whelan served in the Wisconsin State Assembly and was a Republican. He also served in the Wisconsin State Senate from 1897 to 1901. He died at his home in Mondovi on June 3, 1906.
