= 1853 Wisconsin gubernatorial election =

- November 8, 1853
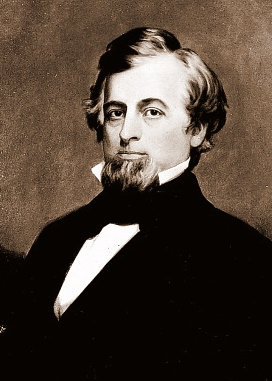

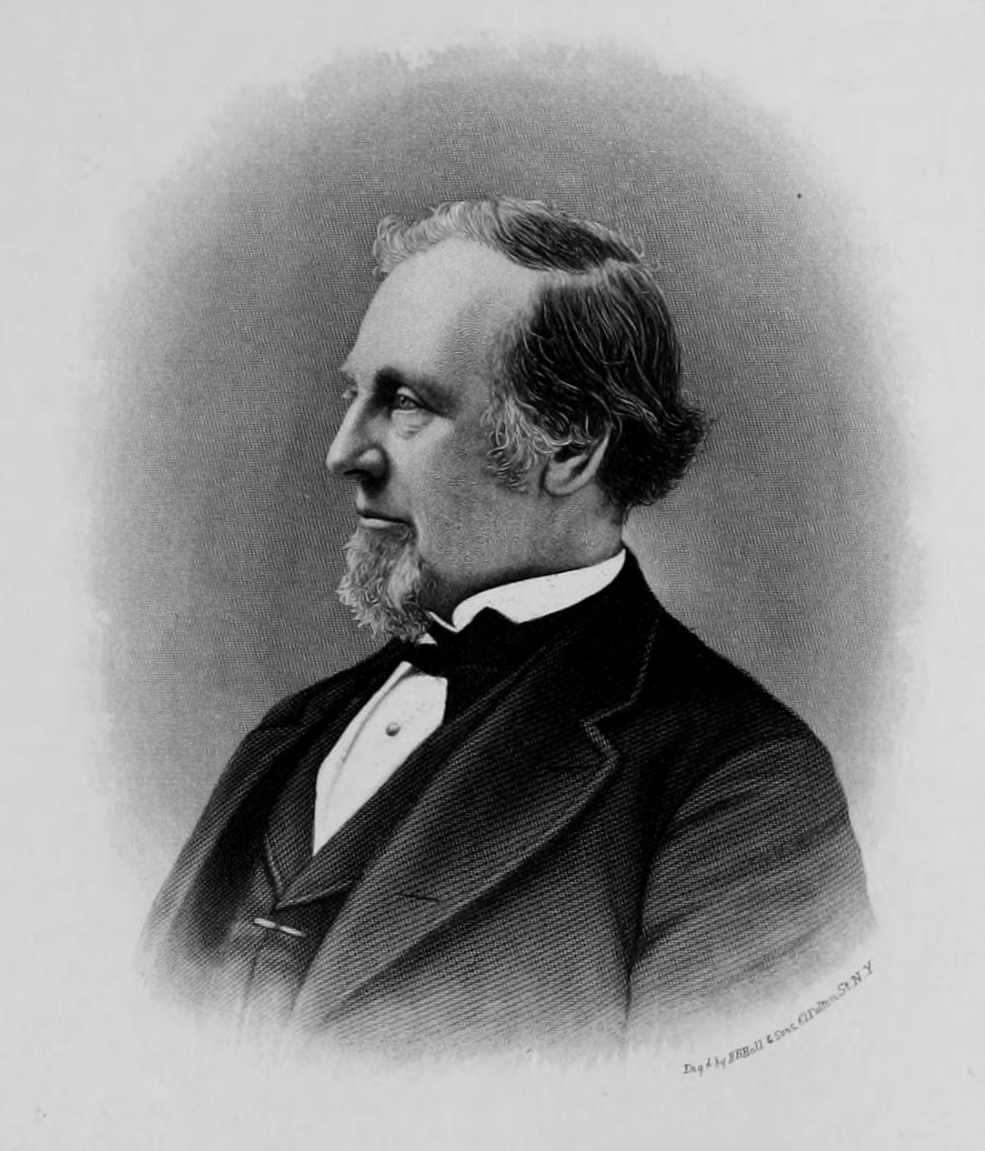

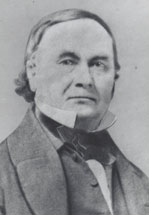
Nominee	William A. Barstow	Edward D. Holton	Henry S. Baird
Party	Democratic	Independent	Whig
Popular vote	30,405	21,886	3,304
Percentage	54.60%	39.30%	5.93%
- County results Barstow: 40–50% 50–60% 60–70% 70–80% Holton: 40–50% 50–60% 60–70% Baird: 40–50% 50–60%
Governor before election
Leonard J. Farwell
Whig
Elected Governor
William A. Barstow
Democratic

The 1853 Wisconsin gubernatorial election was held on November 8, 1853. Democratic candidate William A. Barstow won the election with 55% of the vote, winning his first term as Governor of Wisconsin. Barstow defeated Free Soil Party candidate Edward D. Holton and Whig candidate Henry S. Baird. This would be the last Wisconsin gubernatorial election in which there was a Whig candidate on the ballot.

This was the last election until 1932 in which Adams County and Bad Ax (Vernon) County voted for a Democrat. Additionally, Columbia County would not vote Democratic again until 1924, nor would Green County, Portage County, and Sauk County until 1890.

== Nominations ==
=== Democratic party ===
William A. Barstow was a resident of Waukesha County, and had previously served as Wisconsin's Secretary of State. Before Wisconsin became a state, he was instrumental in creating Waukesha County from what had been the western half of Milwaukee County.

The Wisconsin Democratic Party Convention was held in Janesville in September 1853. Barstow did not intend to seek the nomination for Governor, and, in fact, was supporting A. Hyatt Smith for the nomination. Nevertheless, Barstow's popularity resulted in him receiving five votes on the first ballot, and after Smith deadlocked with Jairus C. Fairchild for seven ballots, Smith withdrew his name and instead endorsed Barstow. Barstow received the nomination on the 13th ballot.

==== Other candidates ====
- Jairus C. Fairchild, of Madison, had been the first State Treasurer of Wisconsin.
- A. Hyatt Smith was the Mayor of Janesville, and had previously served as United States Attorney for Wisconsin and Attorney General of the Wisconsin Territory.
- Timothy Burns, of La Crosse, was the incumbent Lieutenant Governor of Wisconsin. He died just days after the Democratic convention chose Barstow as the nominee.

=== Whig party ===
Henry S. Baird was a resident of Green Bay, and was said to be the first practicing lawyer in the Wisconsin Territory. He had served as Attorney General of the Wisconsin Territory, appointed by Territorial Governor Henry Dodge, and served on the Territorial Council. He was a delegate to Wisconsin's first Constitutional Convention.

=== Independent ===
Edward D. Holton was a resident of Milwaukee. He was a businessman and banker, interested in building a railroad to stretch from Milwaukee to the Mississippi River. He was an avowed abolitionist, first as a member of the Liberty Party, and then its successor the Free Soil Party. He was also a supporter of temperance legislation in Wisconsin. The state ticket he headed in 1853 was referred to as the "People's Ticket" and stood in general opposition to the Democratic ticket.

== Results ==
1853 Wisconsin gubernatorial election
Party	Candidate	Votes	%	±%
Democratic	William A. Barstow	30,405	54.60%	+5.24%
Independent	Edward D. Holton	21,886	39.31%	
Whig	Henry S. Baird	3,304	5.93%	−44.57%
	Scattering	88	0.16%	
Majority		8,519	15.30%	
Total votes		55,683	100.00%	
Democratic gain from Whig		Swing	+16.45%	

=== Results by county ===
County	William A. Barstow Democratic		Edward D. Holton Independent		Henry S. Baird Whig		Scattering Write-in		Margin		Total votes cast
County	#	%	#	%	#	%	#	%	#	%	Total votes cast
Adams	122	51.91%	38	16.17%	57	24.26%	18	7.66%	65 (Note: Barstow's margin over Baird)	27.66%	235
Bad Ax	208	71.23%	7	2.40%	77	26.37%	0	0.00%	131	44.86%	292
Brown	254	40.06%	33	5.21%	334	52.68%	13	2.05%	-80 (Note: Baird's margin over Barstow)	-12.62%	634
Calumet	250	57.74%	90	20.79%	93	21.48%	0	0.00%	157	36.26%	433
Columbia	816	47.22%	706	40.86%	206	11.92%	0	0.00%	110	6.37%	1,728
Crawford	118	69.01%	24	14.04%	29	16.96%	0	0.00%	89	52.05%	171
Dane	1,620	53.17%	1,234	40.50%	177	5.81%	16	0.53%	386	12.67%	3,047
Dodge	1,992	57.89%	1,418	41.21%	31	0.90%	0	0.00%	574	16.68%	3,441
Fond du Lac	1,489	54.01%	1,217	44.14%	51	1.85%	0	0.00%	272	9.87%	2,757
Grant	988	44.73%	1,026	46.45%	195	8.83%	0	0.00%	-38	-1.72%	2,209
Green	769	46.05%	748	44.79%	153	9.16%	0	0.00%	21	1.26%	1,670
Iowa	402	45.68%	464	52.73%	14	1.59%	0	0.00%	-62	-7.05%	880
Jackson	113	88.98%	14	11.02%	0	0.00%	0	0.00%	99	77.95%	127
Jefferson	1,490	46.71%	1,591	49.87%	108	3.39%	1	0.03%	-101	-3.17%	3,190
Kenosha	590	41.96%	812	57.75%	4	0.28%	0	0.00%	-222	-15.79%	1,406
La Crosse	276	56.67%	150	30.80%	61	12.53%	0	0.00%	126	25.87%	487
La Pointe	39	97.50%	0	0.00%	1	2.50%	0	0.00%	38	95.00%	40
Lafayette	1,026	59.44%	420	24.33%	280	16.22%	0	0.00%	606	35.11%	1,726
Manitowoc	854	88.22%	46	4.75%	67	6.92%	1	0.10%	787	81.30%	968
Marathon	205	49.16%	4	0.96%	208	49.88%	0	0.00%	-3	-0.72%	417
Marquette	641	42.53%	852	56.54%	14	0.93%	0	0.00%	-211	-14.00%	1,507
Milwaukee	4,184	75.20%	1,334	23.98%	24	0.43%	22	0.40%	2,850	51.22%	5,564
Oconto	90	42.86%	0	0.00%	120	57.14%	0	0.00%	-30	-14.29%	210
Outagamie	267	54.38%	206	41.96%	18	3.67%	0	0.00%	61	14.29%	491
Ozaukee	1,155	86.58%	179	13.42%	0	0.00%	0	0.00%	976	73.16%	1,334
Pierce	71	67.62%	0	0.00%	34	32.38%	0	0.00%	37	35.24%	105
Portage	367	63.49%	56	9.69%	154	26.64%	1	0.17%	213	36.85%	578
Racine	1,239	50.39%	1,214	49.37%	6	0.24%	0	0.00%	25	1.02%	2,459
Richland	185	56.92%	127	39.08%	13	4.00%	0	0.00%	58	17.85%	325
Rock	1,375	38.80%	1,832	51.69%	337	9.51%	0	0.00%	-457	-12.90%	3,544
Sauk	641	54.74%	472	40.31%	55	4.70%	3	0.26%	169	14.43%	1,171
Sheboygan	1,389	67.07%	676	32.64%	4	0.19%	2	0.10%	713	34.43%	2,071
Walworth	1,062	37.28%	1,584	55.60%	203	7.13%	0	0.00%	-522	-18.32%	2,849
Washington	1,462	82.46%	310	17.48%	0	0.00%	1	0.06%	1,152	64.97%	1,773
Waukesha	1,594	48.84%	1,610	49.33%	54	1.65%	6	0.18%	-16	-0.49%	3,264
Waupaca	217	51.79%	152	36.28%	50	11.93%	0	0.00%	65	15.51%	419
Waushara	135	36.68%	232	63.04%	1	0.27%	0	0.00%	-97	-26.36%	368
Winnebago	710	39.60%	1,008	56.22%	71	3.96%	4	0.22%	-298	-16.62%	1,793
Total	30,405	54.60%	21,886	39.30%	3,304	5.93%	88	0.16%	8,519	15.30%	55,683

==== Counties that flipped from Whig to Democratic ====
- Dane
- Fond du Lac
- Milwaukee
- Racine

==== Counties that flipped from Democratic to Whig ====
- Brown

==== Counties that flipped from Democratic to Independent ====
- Iowa
- Jefferson
- Marquette

==== Counties that flipped from Whig to Independent ====
- Grant
- Kenosha
- Rock
- Walworth
- Waukesha
- Waushara
- Winnebago
