= John Jeffers (politician) =

American politician

John Jeffers (May 3, 1822 – February 22, 1890) was a member of the Wisconsin State Assembly.

== Biography ==
Jeffers was born on May 3, 1822, in Lisburn, Ireland. He married Flora Ann Armstrong. Jeffers died on February 22, 1890, in Delavan, Wisconsin, and was buried in Darien, Wisconsin. He was a Methodist.

== Career ==
Jeffers was a member of the Assembly in 1864 and 1871. He served as an independent.
