= Edward D. Holton =

19th century American politician, Wisconsin pioneer

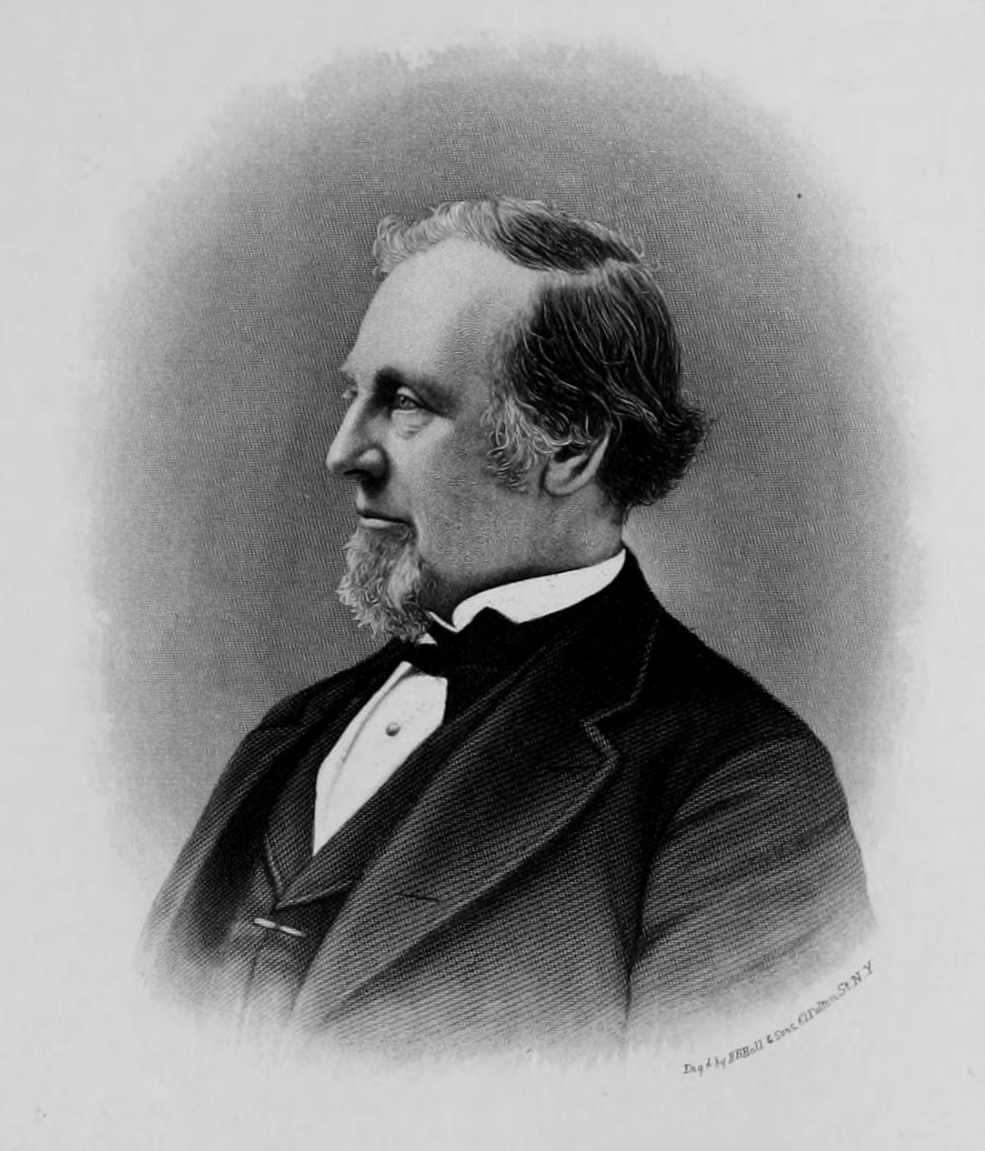

Member of the Wisconsin State Assembly from the Milwaukee 4th district
- In office January 2, 1860 – January 7, 1861
- Preceded by: James A. Swain
- Succeeded by: Charles Caverno

Sheriff of Milwaukee County
- In office May 1843 – January 1, 1847
- Preceded by: Joseph Ward
- Succeeded by: George E. Graves

Personal details
- Born: Edward Dwight Holton; April 28, 1815 Lancaster, New Hampshire, U.S.
- Died: April 21, 1892 (aged 76) Savannah, Georgia, U.S.
- Resting place: Forest Home Cemetery; Milwaukee, Wisconsin
- Party: Republican; Free Soil (before 1854); Liberty (before 1848)
- Spouse: Lucinda C. Holton
- Children: Harriet (Robertson)^{(b. 1851; d. 1941)}
- Relatives: Timothy Dwight Holton (grandfather)
- Occupation: Merchant, railroad promoter, banker
- Known for: Abolitionism, temperance, Republican Party co-founder, namesake of Holton, Kansas
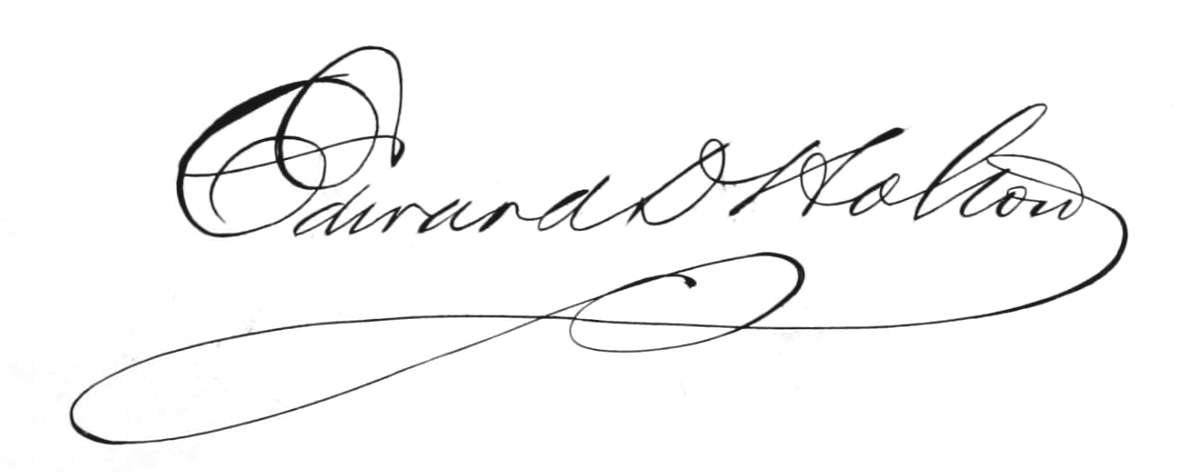
- Signature

Edward Dwight Holton (April 28, 1815 – April 21, 1892) was an American business leader, politician, and Wisconsin pioneer. He was Milwaukee County's first elected sheriff and served one term in the Wisconsin State Assembly (1860). He was influential in the early political development of the state as a leader in Wisconsin's abolitionist and temperance movements, and as a co-founder of the Republican Party. He also had a strong influence on the economic development of the state through his involvement in the banking, railroad, and insurance businesses.

== Early life ==
Holton was born in Lancaster, New Hampshire, and from an early age was raised by his mother alone. At age fourteen he was indentured by her for four years as a clerk in Bath, New Hampshire. He attended ordinary public schools, but was able to achieve qualifications to teach, and when the term of his indenture expired he returned to Lancaster to teach for a year. His general aptitude and business experience as a clerk led to a job in Buffalo as a bookkeeper in the shipping department of a wholesaler. In 1838 he made a brief trip to the recently organized Territory of Wisconsin, returned home when he was disillusioned with the collapse of the real estate market (which had bubbled in 1836,) and in 1840 settled in Milwaukee for good.

== Business career in Wisconsin ==
=== Early Milwaukee merchant ===
In November 1840, he set up his first shop in the corner of a warehouse. He soon engaged in the surging wheat business, being the first to ship wheat from the port of Milwaukee in 1841. The wheat exports from Milwaukee were trivial in 1841, leaped to 95,000 bushels in 1845, and reached 1.1 million bushels in 1849, and Holton's fortune was well endowed by this trade. In 1849 he helped establish and became president of the Milwaukee Board of Trade, which was responsible for coordinating the wheat trade.

=== Railroads ===
In 1849, Holton helped found the Milwaukee and Prairie du Chien Railroad, and served as superintendent until 1851.

=== Banking and other business ===
In 1853, he helped form the Farmers and Millers Bank (a predecessor of Firstar Corporation) and became its first president. During this period there was a good deal of turmoil in banking laws, and Holton was a key factor in rewriting legislation to settle the free-for-all laws.

== Political career in Wisconsin ==
=== Abolitionism and temperance ===
For a period of time he was a trustee of Milwaukee when it was a village. In 1843, he was elected Milwaukee's first sheriff, running as an independent. At this early stage of his political career, Holton was already well known as an abolitionist and temperance advocate. While ordinarily these were political liabilities, he defeated future Wisconsin governor and Democrat William A. Barstow due to the fact that the Democrats were divided by an internal party squabble.

In 1845, Holton was the Liberty Party candidate for territorial representative to Congress, losing to Morgan Lewis Martin, who drew 6,803 votes to 5,787 for Whig James Collins and 790 for Holton.

In 1850 Holton was at the center of a fight over a law assigning to establishments selling liquor liability for harm caused by people who were intoxicated. The law was introduced by state senator John B. Smith and was known as the Smith liquor law. When demonstrations against the law turned into minor riots, a committee was organized to defend the law; Holton was named Chair of the committee. The outcome of the controversy had the unintended consequence that it strengthened the political position of the Democratic Party and weakened the Free-soilers allied with Holton.

=== Gubernatorial Candidacy ===
Holton was the nominee of the Free Soil Party for Governor of Wisconsin in the 1853 election. He was defeated by Democrat William A. Barstow, but finished far ahead of Whig Party candidate Henry S. Baird.

=== Republican Party ===
Holton was one of two principal candidates at the 1857 Wisconsin Republican Party convention, when the party was still very young. The other major candidate was Walter D. McIndoe, a lumber industrialist from Wausau. Holton's abolitionist passions and his connections with the Milwaukee elite gave him strong support, but McIndoe's more rough-hewn personality resonated better with the frontier character of the state at the time. As such, they split the vote, neither able to garner a majority for the nomination. When it became apparent that the convention was at an impasse, and the delegates were released from their obligation, the votes eventually were cast in favor of the third candidate, Alexander Randall, who became the obvious compromise candidate. Randall was the first in a long line of Republican governors in Wisconsin.

Holton served in the Wisconsin Assembly in 1860, representing the Fourth Ward of Milwaukee. In 1862, President Lincoln appointed him allotment commissioner, overseeing a policy where 1/3 of each Union soldier's pay was sent directly to family back home for safekeeping, intended to prevent wasteful spending in camp. He eventually had to resign the commission due to poor health.

== Semi-retirement ==
After resigning his commissioner of allotments, he settled into semi-retirement on his farm. In 1871 he agreed to a position with Northwest National Life Insurance, who needed help managing claims due to the Great Chicago Fire. During this time he also served on the National Board of Trade, and on the board of directors of the International Board of Lake Underwriters.

In 1879 he took a railroad trip to California. Along the way, he stopped for a visit in his namesake town of Holton, Kansas. In California, he visited Yosemite Park by horseback in early spring when snow clogged the trails and travel was difficult.

He remained active in the business community, if not in actual business. He died in Savannah, Georgia, on a return trip to Milwaukee after a visit to Florida.

== Personal life ==
Holton married Lucinda Millard on October 14, 1845, in Dexter, Michigan. She was a second cousin of Millard Fillmore. When Edward died, he was survived by Lucinda and three adult daughters. One daughter, Mary, married Robertson James, the brother of novelist Henry James.

== Legacy ==
Holton, Kansas, is named for him, as are Holton Hall at University of Wisconsin–Milwaukee, and both Holton Street and the Edward Holton Viaduct in Milwaukee.

Party political offices
Vacant Title last held by Warren Chase	Free Soil nominee for Governor of Wisconsin; 1853	Succeeded by Party abolished
Wisconsin State Assembly
Preceded by James A. Swain	Member of the Wisconsin State Assembly from the Milwaukee 4th district January 2, 1860 – January 7, 1861	Succeeded by Charles Caverno
Legal offices
Preceded by Joseph Ward	Sheriff of Milwaukee County; May 1843 – January 1, 1847	Succeeded by George E. Graves
