= Joseph Schrage =

American politician

Joseph Schrage (November 12, 1818 - January 4, 1892) was an American farmer, innkeeper, saloonkeeper, dry goods merchant, grocer, keeper of a livery stable and banker from Sheboygan, Wisconsin who held office in the Wisconsin State Assembly in 1856; as a sheriff; and as a city treasurer, and alderman. He was a Republican. He was born near Olpe, Westphalia, Kingdom of Prussia. In 1842, Schrage emigranted to the United States and eventually settled in Sheboygan, Wisconsin where he started a grocery business. He also started 'The Wisconsin House' for entertainment.
