= Eleazer Wakeley =

American lawyer, politician, and judge

The Honorable Eleazer Wakeley
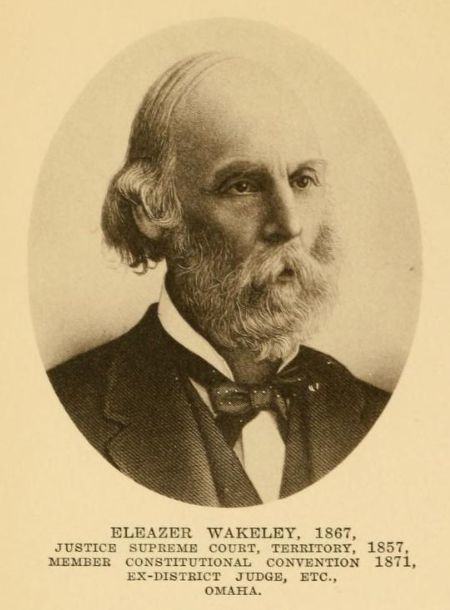

Nebraska District Court Judge
- In office 1883–1892

Associate Justice of the Supreme Court of the Nebraska Territory
- In office January 1857 – May 1861
- Preceded by: James Bradley
- Succeeded by: William F. Lockwood

Member of the Wisconsin Senate
- In office January 1, 1853 – January 1, 1856
- Preceded by: Alva Stewart
- Succeeded by: Jesse C. Mills
- Constituency: 12th Senate district
- In office January 1, 1852 – January 1, 1853
- Preceded by: George Gale
- Succeeded by: Alva Stewart
- Constituency: 14th Senate district

Member of the Wisconsin State Assembly from the Dane 5th district
- In office January 1, 1867 – January 1, 1868
- Preceded by: Benjamin F. Hopkins
- Succeeded by: Levi B. Vilas

Member of the House of Representatives of the Wisconsin Territory for Walworth County
- In office October 18, 1847 – March 13, 1848 Serving with George Walworth
- Preceded by: Charles A. Bronson; Palmer Gardiner
- Succeeded by: Position Abolished

Personal details
- Born: June 25, 1822 Homer, New York, U.S.
- Died: November 21, 1912 (aged 90) Omaha, Nebraska, U.S.
- Resting place: Prospect Hill Cemetery; Omaha, Nebraska
- Party: Democratic
- Spouses: Sabina Sarah Comstock; (died 1918)
- Children: Arthur Cooper Wakeley^{(b. 1855; died 1928)}; Bird Chapman Wakeley^{(b. 1857; died 1911)}; Lucius Winchester Wakeley^{(b. 1859; died 1928)}; Lucy Wakeley^{(b. 1861; died 1917)}; William Comstock Wakeley^{(b. 1862; died 1894)}; Emily Doane (Crain)^{(b. 1871; died 1971)}
- Parents: Solmous Wakeley (father); Hannah (Thompson) Wakeley (mother)
- Profession: lawyer, judge

Military service
- Allegiance: United States
- Branch/service: United States Volunteers; Union Army
- Years of service: 1862–1863
- Rank: Corporal, USV
- Unit: 145th Reg. Penn. Vol. Infantry
- Battles/wars: American Civil War: Battle of Fredericksburg

Eleazer Wakeley (June 25, 1822 – November 21, 1912) was an American lawyer, politician, judge, and pioneer of Wisconsin and Nebraska. He was a Nebraska District Court Judge, a justice of the Nebraska Territory's Supreme Court, and a delegate to Nebraska's constitutional convention. In Wisconsin, he served two terms in the Wisconsin State Senate and one in the Wisconsin State Assembly, he also served in the last sessions of the legislature of the Wisconsin Territory.

== Early years ==
Born in Homer, New York, Wakeley and his family moved first to Pennsylvania and then to Elyria, Ohio, where he studied the law and was admitted to the Ohio bar. His father was Solmous Wakeley, who served in the Wisconsin Legislature. Wakeley moved to Wisconsin Territory to Whitewater, in Walworth County, where he served in the Wisconsin Territorial Legislature.

== Career ==
In 1857, Wakeley was appointed to the Nebraska Territorial Supreme Court serving until 1861. He served briefly in the American Civil War, volunteering with the 145th Pennsylvania Infantry Regiment, but received a medical discharge after the Battle of Fredericksburg, only four months into his service. He returned to Wisconsin to practice law and, in 1863, ran for Wisconsin Attorney General, but lost.

Wakeley served in the Wisconsin State Senate 1851–1855 and the Wisconsin State Assembly 1866–1867.

In 1867, Wakeley and his family moved to Omaha, Nebraska. There he practiced law and served in the 1877 Nebraska Constitutional Convention. Wakeley was appointed Nebraska district court judge and was the first president of the Nebraska State Bar Association.

== Death ==
After he died in Omaha on November 21, 1912, he was buried at the Prospect Hill Cemetery.

Wisconsin State Assembly
Preceded by Benjamin F. Hopkins	Member of the Wisconsin State Assembly from the Dane 5th district January 1, 1867 – January 1, 1868	Succeeded by Levi B. Vilas
Wisconsin Senate
Preceded by George Gale	Member of the Wisconsin Senate from the 14th district January 1, 1852 – January 1, 1853	Succeeded by Alva Stewart
Preceded by Alva Stewart	Member of the Wisconsin Senate from the 12th district January 1, 1853 – January 1, 1856	Succeeded by Jesse C. Mills
Legal offices
Preceded by James Bradley	Associate Justice of the Supreme Court of the Nebraska Territory; January 1857 – May 1861	Succeeded by William F. Lockwood
