= David Agry =

American lawyer, jurist, and legislator

Member of the Wisconsin State Assembly from the Brown County district
- In office 1848–1849

Personal details
- Born: August 2, 1794 Pittston, Maine, U.S.
- Died: January 30, 1877 (aged 82) Green Bay, Wisconsin, U.S.
- Parent(s): John Agry; Elizabeeth Reed Agry
- Education: Dartmouth College
- Profession: Lawyer; Jurist; Politician

David Agry (August 2, 1794 – January 30, 1877) was an American lawyer, jurist, and legislator. He served as a member of the Wisconsin Territorial House of Representatives and the Wisconsin State Assembly.

== Biography ==
Agry, who practiced law, was born in Pittston, Maine, the son of John Agry and Elizabeeth (Reed) Agry. He graduated from Dartmouth College, studied law in Maine and was admitted to the Maine State Bar Association. A practitioner of law, he practiced law in Bangor, Maine, before moving to Louisiana to practice law. He then moved to New York City where he practiced law and was in business while practicing law. In 1840, Agry moved to Brown County, Wisconsin Territory where he practiced law.

== Political career ==
In 1842 and 1843, he served in the Wisconsin Territorial House of Representatives, representing Winnebago County, Wisconsin. He was in the first Wisconsin Constitutional Convention of 1846. In 1848, Agry served in the 1st Wisconsin Legislature as a Democratic member of the State Assembly. He was elected Wisconsin Circuit Court Judge for Brown County in 1850, serving until his death on January 30, 1877, in Green Bay, Wisconsin.
