= Charles Dunn (Wisconsin politician) =

American judge (1799–1872)

The Honorable Charles Dunn
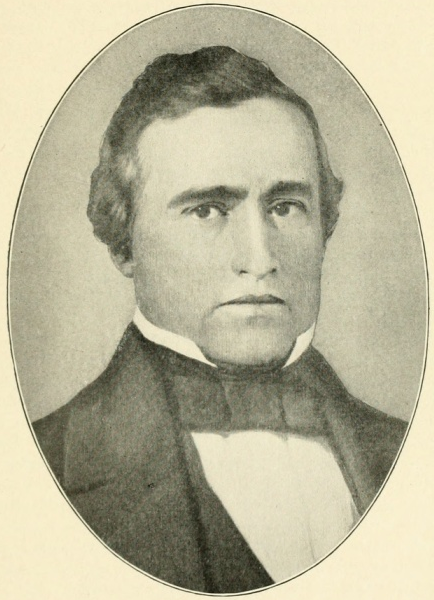
- Portrait from The Story of a Great Court (1912)

Chief Justice of the Supreme Court of the Wisconsin Territory
- In office 1836–1848
- Appointed by: Andrew Jackson
- Preceded by: Position Established
- Succeeded by: Alexander W. Stow (state government)

Member of the Wisconsin Senate from the 13th district
- In office January 3, 1853 – January 5, 1857
- Preceded by: E. B. West
- Succeeded by: Philemon Simpson

Personal details
- Born: December 28, 1799 Bullitt's Lick, Bullitt County, Kentucky, U.S.
- Died: April 7, 1872 (aged 72) Mineral Point, Wisconsin, U.S.
- Resting place: Greenwood Cemetery; Platteville, Wisconsin
- Spouse: Mary E. Shrader (m. 1821–1872)
- Children: Catherine (Dewey)^{(died 1898)}; Otho Shrader Dunn^{(b. 1822; died 1834)}; John Dunn^{(b. 1824; died 1910)}; Cynthia Dunn^{(b. 1832; died 1835)}; Henry Dunn^{(b. 1841; died 1848)}; Mamie Dunn^{(b. 1851; died 1859)}
- Parents: John Dunn (father); Amy (Burks) Dunn (mother)
- Relatives: Nelson Dewey (son-in-law)

Military service
- Allegiance: United States
- Branch/service: Illinois Militia
- Battles/wars: Black Hawk War

Charles Dunn (December 28, 1799 – April 7, 1872) was an American lawyer, judge, and one of the founding fathers of the state of Wisconsin. He was the only person to serve as chief justice of the Supreme Court of the Wisconsin Territory, and was one of the chief framers of the Constitution of Wisconsin, chairing the committee on the judiciary at the constitutional convention in the winter of 1847–1848. After Wisconsin became a state he served four years in the Wisconsin Senate, representing Lafayette County from 1853 to 1857. He is the namesake of Dunn County, Wisconsin.

Charles Dunn's only surviving daughter, Catherine, married Wisconsin's first state governor, Nelson Dewey.

== Biography ==
Born in Bullitt's Lick, Bullitt County, Kentucky, Dunn was educated in Kentucky and Illinois. Dunn read law under Nathaniel Pope in Illinois and was admitted to the Illinois bar. During the Black Hawk War of 1832, Dunn served in the Illinois Militia. Dunn served as the clerk of the Illinois House of Representatives and was elected to serve in the Illinois House.

In 1836, President Andrew Jackson appointed Dunn to the Wisconsin Territorial Supreme Court and he served as chief justice of the court until Wisconsin was admitted to the union on May 29, 1848. Among other cases, Dunn presided at Mineral Point in the murder trial of William Caffey in 1842. Caffey was defended by Moses R. Strong, and despite a colorable self-defence plea, Caffey was convicted and hanged near the spot where the railroad station later would stand. It is said to be the last hanging in Wisconsin, and Caffey's ghost is said to frequent the nearby Walker House hotel.

Dunn served in the second Wisconsin Constitutional Convention of 1847–1848 and helped draft the judiciary article in the Wisconsin Constitution of 1848. Dunn served in the Wisconsin State Senate from 1853 to 1856. In 1858, Dunn ran for the United States House of Representatives and lost. Dunn then resumed his law practice, settling and living in Belmont, Wisconsin, for the rest of his life.

== Family and legacy ==
Charles Dunn was the eldest son and second of at least nine children born to Irish American immigrant John Dunn (1754–1837) and his wife Amy (née Burks; 1777–1850).

Charles Dunn married Mary E. Shrader in 1821. They had at least six children, but only two survived to adulthood. Their daughter Catherine married Nelson Dewey, the first Governor of Wisconsin, during his first term as governor.

Dunn County, Wisconsin, was named in his honor.

== Electoral history ==
=== Wisconsin Supreme Court (1868) ===
1868 Wisconsin Supreme Court Chief Justice special election
Party	Candidate	Votes	%	±%
General Election, April 7, 1868
Republican	Luther S. Dixon (incumbent)	72,470	52.40%	
Democratic	Charles Dunn	65,683	47.49%	
	Scattering	145	0.10%	
Plurality		6,787	4.91%	
Total votes		138,298	100.0%	
Republican hold				

Wisconsin Senate
Preceded by E. B. West	Member of the Wisconsin Senate from the 13th district January 3, 1853 – January 5, 1857	Succeeded by Philemon Simpson
Legal offices
New territory	Chief Justice of the Supreme Court of the Wisconsin Territory; 1836–1848	Succeeded by Alexander W. Stow (state government)
