= 1857 United States Senate election in Wisconsin =

- January 23, 1857
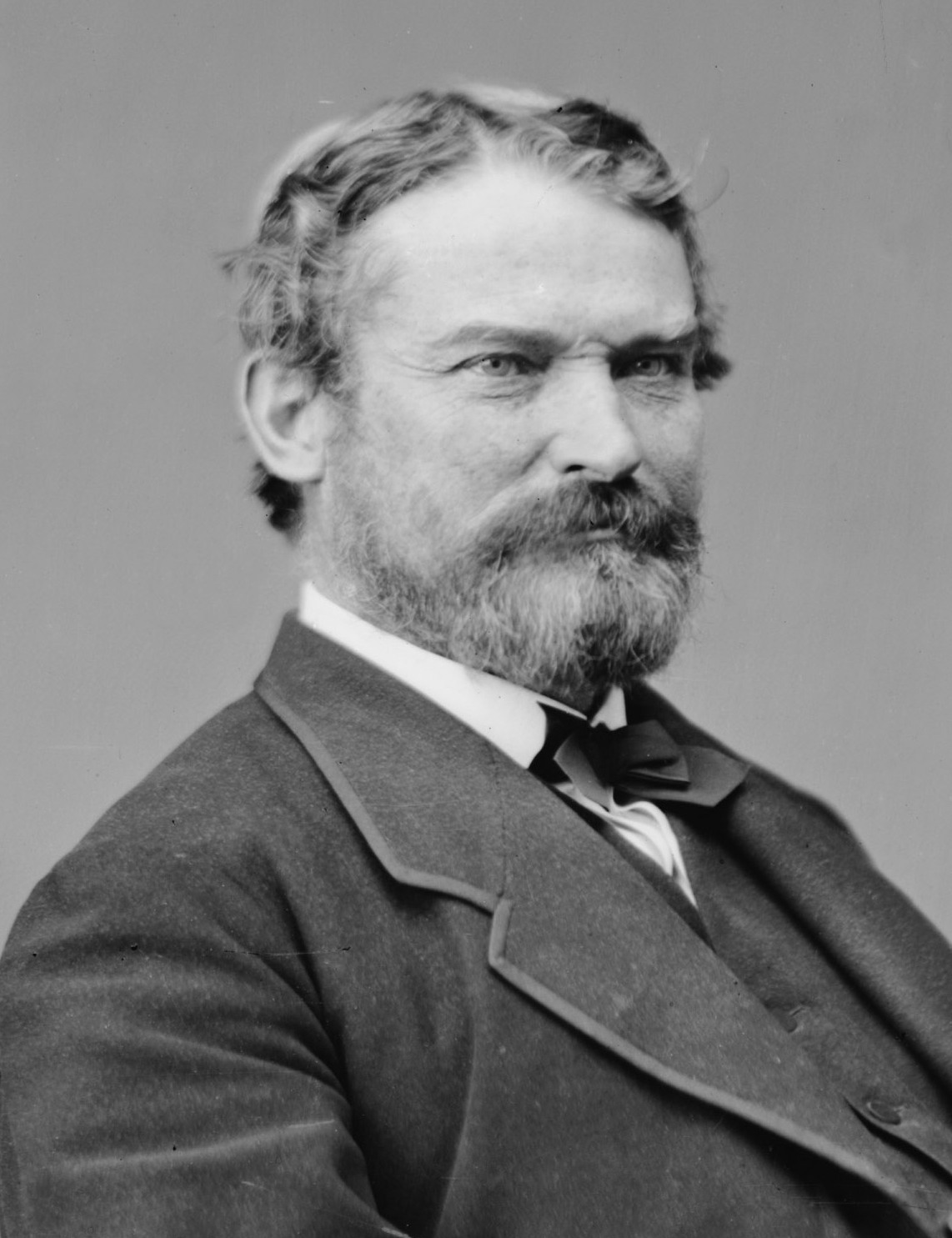

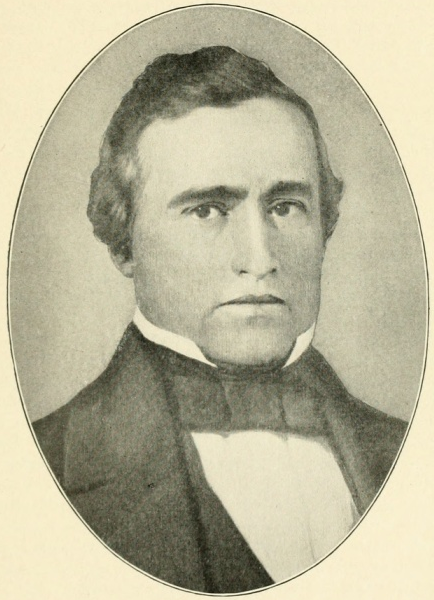
| Nominee | James R. Doolittle | Charles Dunn |
| Party | Republican | Democratic |
| Legislative vote | 79 | 34 |
| Percentage | 67.52% | 30.77% |
U.S. senator before election
Henry Dodge
Democratic
Elected U.S. Senator
James R. Doolittle
Republican

The 1857 United States Senate election in Wisconsin was held in the 10th Wisconsin Legislature on January 23, 1857. Incumbent Democratic U.S. senator Henry Dodge did not run for re-election. Former Wisconsin circuit court judge James R. Doolittle was elected United States senator on the first ballot.

At the start of the 1857 term, Republicans held large majorities in both chambers of the Wisconsin Legislature, so had more than enough votes to elect a Republican United States senator. The main drama of the election was in the Republican legislative caucuses as they parsed through Republican candidates and selected the former judge, James R. Doolittle, as their nominee.

== Major candidates ==
=== Democratic ===
- Charles Dunn, former chief justice of the Wisconsin Territory Supreme Court, former state senator.

=== Republican ===
- J. Allen Barber, incumbent state senator, former state representative, former district attorney of Grant County, Wisconsin.
- James R. Doolittle, former Wisconsin circuit court judge from Racine.
- Edward D. Holton, leading Wisconsin abolitionist, former Liberty Party and Free Soil Party candidate for U.S. representative and governor.
- Timothy O. Howe, former Wisconsin circuit court judge from Green Bay.
- Mortimer M. Jackson, former Wisconsin circuit court judge and Wisconsin Territory attorney general.
- Alexander Randall, newly elected governor of Wisconsin.
- Wyman Spooner, incumbent speaker of the Assembly and former Wisconsin circuit court judge.

== Results ==
=== Republican nomination ===
Prior to the caucus, Timothy Howe was identified as the candidate with the most support in the Republican caucus, with Holton and Doolittle each not far behind. The Wisconsin State Journal at the time reported that supporters of Holton attempted to advance his cause by suggesting that Howe and Doolittle were not sufficiently loyal to the abolitionist cause because they had been supportive of compromise positions before the Kansas–Nebraska Act. The Journal speculated that these attacks likely backfired on Holton since, they presumed, the vast majority of Wisconsin Republicans had a political evolution similar to that of Howe and Doolittle.

The Republicans met in caucus from January 19 through January 21 to select a nominee from the several candidates seeking the office. As predicted, on the first day, the leading candidates were Timothy Howe, James Doolittle, and Edward Holton, each with support of about a quarter of the caucus. After two ballots on January 19, the caucus broke and reconvened on January 20. They took eight more votes on January 20, with Howe's support growing from 29 votes to 36, and Holton and Doolittle fading. A fourth candidate, J. Allen Barber, began to grow in support toward the end of the day.

On January 21, Holton withdrew from the race and endorsed Barber. Barber's support initially swelled, but never matched Holton's. Much of his support eventually went over to Doolittle, who surged ahead of Howe on the 4th ballot of the day (14th overall). On the 6th ballot of the day, Doolittle was nominated with a bare majority of 41 of 81 votes cast.

=== Official vote ===
The 10th Wisconsin Legislature met in joint session on January 23, 1857, to elect a U.S. senator. The voting was mostly along party lines, with 9 Democrats and 1 Republican absent. Republican Assembly speaker Wyman Spooner declined to vote for the Republican nominee, instead voting for judge David Taylor. Republican state representative Jared F. Ostrander attempted to abstain from voting; after he was told that he could not abstain, he voted for "Jack Frost", probably a joke about the winter weather occurring at the time of the vote.

A minor controversy occurred after the vote but before the reading of the results, when Frederick W. Horn attempted to introduce papers relating to the eligibility of Doolittle to serve as U.S. senator. The eligibility question largely hinged on whether Wisconsin law allowed former judges to serve in other partisan offices, and was similar to the eligibility argument brought against Illinois U.S. senator Lyman Trumbull a year earlier. The Republican majority strongly opposed the reading of the papers. The president of the joint session, lieutenant governor Arthur MacArthur Sr., attempted to have the papers read anyway, but the chief clerk, William Henry Brisbane, ignored his request because he believed he could not act in his official capacity against the vote of the majority of the convention.

1st Vote of the 10th Wisconsin Legislature, January 23, 1857
| Party | Candidate | Votes | % |
|---|---|---|---|
| Republican | James R. Doolittle | 79 (Note: Doolittle received the votes of all Republicans except senator Edward Pier (who was absent) and representatives Wyman Spooner and Jared F. Ostrander (who voted for others).) | 67.52% |
| Democratic | Charles Dunn | 34 (Note: Dunn received the votes of all Democrats except senator S. L. Rose and representatives Frederick K. Bartlett, William Chappell, Edgar Conklin, Zebulon P. Mason, Andrew McCormick, Benjamin F. Phillips, Moses M. Strong, and Jonathan Taylor (who were all absent).) | 30.77% |
| Republican | David Taylor | 1 (Note: Wyman Spooner voted for Judge David Taylor.) | 0.85% |
| | "Jack Frost" | 1 (Note: Jared F. Ostrander voted for "Jack Frost" after he was told that he could not abstain from voting.) | 0.85% |
| | Absent | 10 | |
| Majority | | 59 | 50.42% |
| Total votes | | 117 | 100.0% |
| Republican gain from Democratic | | | |
