= 10th Wisconsin Legislature =

Wisconsin legislative term for 1857

←	9th	11th	→
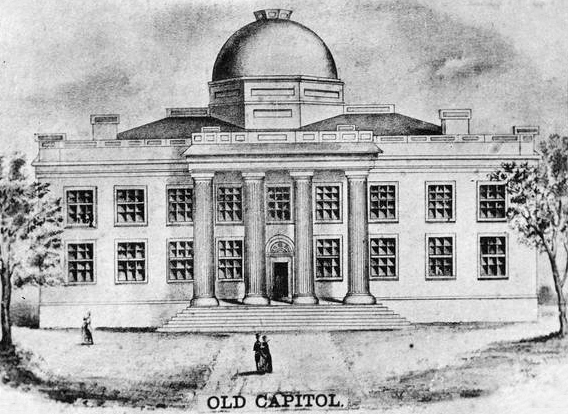
- Wisconsin State Capitol, 1855

Overview
- Legislative body: Wisconsin Legislature
- Meeting place: Wisconsin State Capitol
- Term: January 5, 1857 – January 4, 1858
- Election: November 4, 1856

Senate
- Members: 30
- Senate President: Arthur MacArthur Sr. (D)
- Party control: Republican

Assembly
- Members: 97
- Assembly Speaker: Wyman Spooner (R)
- Party control: Republican

Sessions
- 1st: January 14, 1857 – March 9, 1857

The Tenth Wisconsin Legislature convened from January 14, 1857, to March 9, 1857, in regular session.

This was the first legislative session after the expansion and redistricting of the Senate and Assembly according to an act of the previous session. The Senate grew from 25 to 30 seats; the Assembly grew from 82 to 97 seats.

Senators representing odd-numbered districts were newly elected for this session and were serving the first year of a two-year term. Assembly members were elected to a one-year term. Assembly members and odd-numbered senators were elected in the general election of November 4, 1856. Senators representing even-numbered districts were serving the second year of their two-year term, having been elected in the general election held on November 6, 1855, or were elected in the 1856 election for a newly created district and were serving a one-year term.

The governor of Wisconsin during this entire term was Republican Coles Bashford, of Winnebago County, serving the second year of a two-year term, having won election in the 1855 Wisconsin gubernatorial election.

== Major events ==
- January 23, 1857: James Rood Doolittle elected United States Senator by the Wisconsin Legislature in joint session.
- March 4, 1857: Inauguration of James Buchanan as the 15th President of the United States.
- November 3, 1857: Alexander Randall elected Governor of Wisconsin.

== Major legislation ==
- February 19, 1857: Act relating to the writ of Habeas Corpus to persons claimed as Fugitive Slaves, the right of trial by jury, and to prevent kidnapping in this State, 1857 Act 8. This was an attempt to make it more difficult to arrest people on accusation that they were fugitive slaves. It also introduced severe penalties for falsely claiming a person as a fugitive slave.
- February 28, 1857: Act providing for the erection of the main edifice of the State University, 1857 Act 25
- February 28, 1857: Act authorizing the enlargement of the State Capitol, and providing and appropriating means for the payment of the same, 1857 Act 26
- March 4, 1857: Act to extend the right of Suffrage, 1857 Act 44. This was the second attempt to create a referendum which would grant voting rights to African American men in Wisconsin. The first referendum passed, but was deemed illegitimate. This referendum would fail in the 1857 election. Ultimately, the Wisconsin Supreme Court would rule in the 1866 case of Gillespie v. Palmer that the earlier referendum was valid, and that African American men would have the right to vote in the state.
- March 7, 1857: Act to preserve the purity of Elections, 1857 Act 85
- March 9, 1857: Act to provide for the appointment of a Superintendent of Public Property and to define his powers and duties, 1857 Act 95

== Party summary ==
=== Senate summary ===
Senate partisan composition Democratic: 11 seats Republican: 19 seats

	Party (Shading indicates majority caucus)			Total	
	Democratic	Ind.	Republican	Total	Vacant
End of previous Legislature	12	0	13	25	0
1st Session	11	0	19	30	0
Final voting share	37%	0%	63%		
Beginning of the next Legislature	12	0	18	30	0

=== Assembly summary ===
Assembly partisan composition Democratic: 34 seats Republican: 63 seats

	Party (Shading indicates majority caucus)			Total	
	Democratic	Ind.	Republican	Total	Vacant
End of previous Legislature	47	1	34	82	0
1st Session	34	0	63	97	0
Final voting share	35%	0%	65%		
Beginning of the next Legislature	44	0	53	97	0

== Sessions ==
- 1st Regular session: January 14, 1857 – March 9, 1857

== Leaders ==
=== Senate leadership ===
- President of the Senate: Arthur MacArthur Sr., Lieutenant Governor
- President pro tempore:

=== Assembly leadership ===
- Speaker of the Assembly: Wyman Spooner

== Members ==
=== Members of the Senate ===
Members of the Wisconsin Senate for the Tenth Wisconsin Legislature (30):

Senate partisan representation Democratic: 11 seats Republican: 19 seats

District	Counties	Senator	Party	Residence
01	Sheboygan	Elijah Fox Cook	Dem.	Sheboygan
02	Brown, Door, Kewaunee, Oconto, Outagamie, Shawanaw	Perry H. Smith	Dem.	Appleton
03	Ozaukee	Herman J. Schulteis	Dem.	Ozaukee
04	Washington	Baruch S. Weil	Dem.	Schleisingerville
05	Milwaukee (Northern Half)	Augustus Greulich	Dem.	Milwaukee
06	Milwaukee (Southern Half)	Edward O'Neill	Dem.	Milwaukee
07	Racine	Champion S. Chase	Rep.	Racine
08	Kenosha	C. Latham Sholes	Rep.	Kenosha
09	Adams, Juneau, Sauk	John T. Kingston	Rep.	Necedah
10	Waukesha	Edward Gernon	Dem.	Genesee
11	Dane (Eastern Part)	Hiram H. Giles	Rep.	Stoughton
12	Walworth	Jesse C. Mills	Rep.	Elkhorn
13	Lafayette	Philemon B. Simpson	Dem.	Shullsburg
14	Jefferson (Northern Part) & Dodge (Southern Part)	S. W. Barnes	Dem.	Watertown
15	Iowa & Richland	Lemuel W. Joiner	Rep.	Wyoming
16	Grant	J. Allen Barber	Rep.	Lancaster
17	Rock (Western Part)	James Sutherland	Rep.	Janesville
18	Rock (Eastern Part)	Louis P. Harvey	Rep.	Shopiere
19	Manitowoc, Calumet	Temple Clark	Dem.	Manitowoc
20	Fond du Lac	Edward Pier	Rep.	Fond du Lac
21	Winnebago	Edwin Wheeler	Rep.	Oshkosh
22	Dodge (Northern Part)	S. L. Rose	Dem.	Beaver Dam
23	Jefferson (Southern Part)	Samuel C. Bean	Rep.	Lake Mills
24	Green	George E. Dexter	Rep.	Monroe
25	Columbia	Moses M. Davis	Rep.	Portage
26	Dane (Western Part)	Hiram C. Bull	Rep.	Madison
27	Marathon, Portage, Waupaca, Waushara, Wood	Luther Hanchett	Rep.	Plover
28	Burnett, Chippewa, Clark, Douglas, Dunn, La Pointe, Pierce, Polk, St. Croix	William Wilson	Rep.	Menomonie
29	Marquette	Martin L. Kimball	Rep.	Berlin
30	Bad Ax, Buffalo, Crawford, Jackson, La Crosse, Monroe, Tremealeau	William T. Price	Rep.	Black River Falls

=== Members of the Assembly ===
Members of the Assembly for the Tenth Wisconsin Legislature (97):

Assembly partisan representation Democratic: 34 seats Republican: 63 seats

Senate District	County	District	Representative	Party	Residence
09	Adams & Juneau		Joseph Langworthy	Rep.	Mauston
28	Ashland, Burnett, Douglas, La Pointe, Polk, St. Croix		George Strong	Rep.	Hudson
30	Bad Ax, Crawford		Buel E. Hutchinson	Rep.	Prairie du Chien
02	Brown		Edgar Conklin	Dem.	Green Bay
30	Buffalo, Jackson, Trempealeau		Samuel D. Hastings	Rep.	Trempealeau
19	Calumet		George A. Jenkins	Rep.	Charlestown
28	Chippewa, Clark, Dunn, & Pierce		Orrin T. Maxson	Rep.	Prescott
25	Columbia	1	George M. Bartholomew	Rep.	Lodi
25	Columbia	2	Oliver C. Howe	Rep.	Lowville
25	Columbia	3	Henry Converse	Rep.	Wyocena
11	Dane	1	John A. Johnson	Rep.	Stoughton
11	Dane	2	Robert W. Davison	Rep.	Beverly
11	Dane	3	Robert P. Main	Rep.	Oregon
26	Dane	4	John B. Sweat	Dem.	Black Earth
26	Dane	5	Horace A. Tenney	Rep.	Madison
26	Dane	6	Nathaniel W. Dean	Rep.	Madison
22	Dodge	1	Edward N. Foster	Rep.	Mayville
22	Dodge	2	Peter Potter	Dem.	Leroy
22	Dodge	3	Robert B. Wentworth	Rep.	Juneau
22	Dodge	4	Quartus H. Barron	Rep.	Fox Lake
22	Dodge	5	A. Scott Sloan	Rep.	Beaver Dam
22	Dodge	6	John J. Williams	Rep.	Springfield
02	Door, Kewaunee, Oconto, & Shawano		Ezra B. Stevens	Rep.	Sturgeon Bay
20	Fond du Lac	1	Edmund L. Runals	Rep.	Ripon
20	Fond du Lac	2	Morris S. Barnett	Rep.	Rosendale
20	Fond du Lac	3	John B. Wilbor	Dem.	Fond du Lac
20	Fond du Lac	4	Major J. Thomas	Dem.	Fond du Lac
20	Fond du Lac	5	Aaron Walters	Dem.	Fond du Lac
16	Grant	1	Allen Taylor	Rep.	Hazel Green
16	Grant	2	Albert W. Emerey	Dem.	Potosi
16	Grant	3	Hanmer Robbins	Rep.	Platteville
16	Grant	4	Joseph T. Mills	Rep.	Lancaster
16	Grant	5	Joachim Gulick	Rep.	Ora Oak
24	Green	1	Charles F. Thompson	Rep.	Monticello
24	Green	2	Thomas W. Hall	Rep.	Monroe
15	Iowa	1	Ephraim Knowlton	Dem.	Highland
15	Iowa	2	Thomas S. Allen	Rep.	Mineral Point
23	Jefferson	1	Delatus M. Aspinwall	Rep.	Farmington
23	Jefferson	2	Jared F. Ostrander	Rep.	Aztalan
14	Jefferson	3	William Chappell	Dem.	Watertown
14	Jefferson	4	William M. Morse	Dem.	Alderly
14	Jefferson	5	Kendall P. Clark	Dem.	Portland
08	Kenosha	1	Frederick S. Lovell	Rep.	Kenosha
08	Kenosha	2	Lathrop Burgess	Rep.	Salem
30	La Crosse, Monroe		Dugald D. Cameron	Rep.	La Crosse
13	Lafayette	1	Joseph White	Dem.	Cottage Inn
13	Lafayette	2	Henry W. Barnes	Dem.	Wiota
13	Lafayette	3	James H. Earnest	Dem.	New Diggings
19	Manitowoc	1	Charles H. Walker	Dem.	Manitowoc
19	Manitowoc	2	Thomas Cunningham	Dem.	Clarks Mills
27	Marathon, Portage, Wood		Anson Rood	Rep.	Stevens Point
29	Marquette	1	Davis H. Waite	Rep.	Princeton
29	Marquette	2	Paul D. Hayward	Rep.	Kingston
05	Milwaukee	1	Frederick K. Bartlett	Dem.	Milwaukee
05	Milwaukee	2	Moses M. Strong	Dem.	Milwaukee
06	Milwaukee	3	Andrew McCormick	Dem.	Milwaukee
06	Milwaukee	4	Jonathan Taylor	Dem.	Milwaukee
06	Milwaukee	5	Jasper Humphrey	Dem.	Milwaukee
05	Milwaukee	6	Herman Haertel	Dem.	Milwaukee
05	Milwaukee	7	Frederick Moskowitt	Dem.	Milwaukee
06	Milwaukee	8	James Reynolds	Dem.	Milwaukee
06	Milwaukee	9	James D. Reymert	Dem.	Milwaukee
02	Outagamie		Theodore Conkey	Dem.	Appleton
03	Ozaukee	1	Samuel A. White	Dem.	Ozaukee
03	Ozaukee	2	Frederick W. Horn	Dem.	Cedarburg
07	Racine	1	Llewelyn Evans	Rep.	Racine
07	Racine	2	Peter C. Lutkin	Rep.	Whitesville
07	Racine	3	Joseph Nelson	Rep.	Raymond
07	Racine	4	James Catton	Rep.	Burlington
15	Richland		Robert C. Field	Rep.	Richland
18	Rock	1	Lucius G. Fisher	Rep.	Beloit
18	Rock	2	George R. Atherton	Rep.	Clinton
17	Rock	3	David Noggle	Rep.	Janesville
17	Rock	4	Ezra A. Foot	Rep.	Footville
17	Rock	5	William H. Tripp	Rep.	Janesville
09	Sauk	1	James G. Train	Rep.	Merrimack
09	Sauk	2	Abram West	Rep.	Reedsburg
01	Sheboygan	1	Zebulon P. Mason	Dem.	Sheboygan
01	Sheboygan	2	Robert H. Hotchkiss	Dem.	Plymouth
01	Sheboygan	3	Glenville W. Stone	Rep.	Winooski
12	Walworth	1	David Williams	Rep.	Springfield
12	Walworth	2	Samuel W. Voorhees	Rep.	Sharon
12	Walworth	3	Solmous Wakeley	Rep.	Whitewater
12	Walworth	4	Wyman Spooner	Rep.	Elkhorn
04	Washington	1	Hopewell Coxe	Dem.	Hartford
04	Washington	2	James Vollmar	Dem.	West Bend
04	Washington	3	James Fagan	Dem.	Cedarburg
10	Waukesha	1	James M. Lewis	Rep.	Oconomowoc
10	Waukesha	2	George Cairncross	Rep.	Pewaukee
10	Waukesha	3	Thomas Sugden	Rep.	North Prairie
10	Waukesha	4	Elihu Enos	Rep.	Waukesha
10	Waukesha	5	Charles S. Hawley	Rep.	Waukesha
27	Waupaca		Benjamin F. Phillips	Dem.	Mukwa
27	Waushara		George Hawley	Rep.	Poysippi
21	Winnebago	1	Philetus Sawyer	Rep.	Oshkosh
21	Winnebago	2	John Anunson	Rep.	Winchester
21	Winnebago	3	William P. McAllister	Rep.	Omro

== Employees ==
=== Senate employees ===
- Chief Clerk: William Henry Brisbane
- Sergeant-at-Arms: Alanson Filer

=== Assembly employees ===
- Chief Clerk: William C. Webb
- Sergeant-at-Arms: William C. Rogers

== Changes from the 9th Legislature ==
The most significant structural change to the Legislature between the 9th and 10th sessions was the reapportionment and redistricting of legislative seats. The new districts were defined in 1856 Wisconsin Act 109, passed into law in the 9th Wisconsin Legislature.

=== Senate redistricting ===
==== Summary of changes ====
- 17 senate districts were left unchanged.
- Dane County went from having one senator to two (11, 26).
- Jefferson County went from having one senator to two (14, 23).
- Marquette County became its own senate district (29), after previously having been in a shared district with Adams, Sauk, and Waushara counties.
- Sheboygan County became its own senate district (1), after previously having been in a shared district with Calumet and Manitowoc counties
- Waukesha County went from two senators to one (10).
- The multi-county, lightly-populated northern and western regions of the state went from two senators to four (2, 27, 28, 30).

==== Senate districts ====
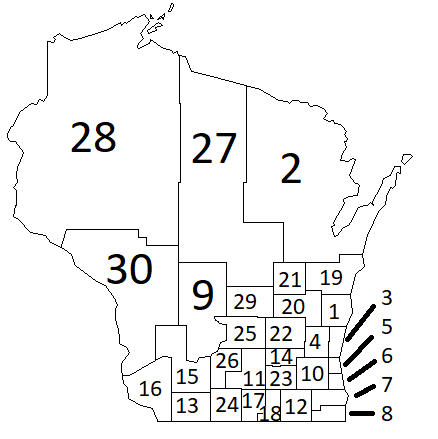
after redistricting

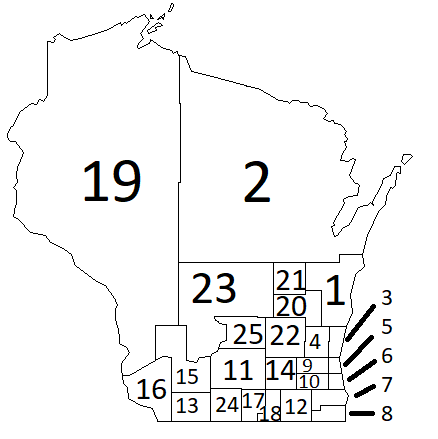
before redistricting

Dist.	9th Legislature	10th Legislature
1	Calumet, Manitowoc, Sheboygan counties	Sheboygan County
2	Brown, Door, Marathon, Oconto, Outagamie, Portage, Waupaca counties	Brown, Outagamie, Door, Kewaunee, Oconto, Shawano counties
3	Ozaukee County	Ozaukee County
4	Washington County	Washington County
5	Northern Milwaukee County	Northern Milwaukee County
6	Southern Milwaukee County	Southern Milwaukee County
7	Racine County	Racine County
8	Kenosha County	Kenosha County
9	Northern Waukesha County	Sauk, Adams, Juneau counties
10	Southern Waukesha County	Waukesha County
11	Dane County	Eastern Dane County
12	Walworth County	Walworth County
13	Lafayette County	Lafayette County
14	Jefferson County	Northern Jefferson County
15	Iowa, Richland counties	Iowa, Richland counties
16	Grant County	Grant County
17	Western Rock County	Western Rock County
18	Eastern Rock County	Eastern Rock County
19	Bad Ax, Buffalo, Chippewa, Clark, Crawford, Jackson, La Crosse, La Pointe, Pierce, Polk, St. Croix counties	Manitowoc, Calumet County
20	Fond du Lac County	Fond du Lac County
21	Winnebago County	Winnebago County
22	Dodge County	Dodge County
23	Adams, Marquette, Sauk, Waushara counties	Southern Jefferson County
24	Green County	Green County
25	Columbia County	Columbia County
26	Did not exist in 9th Legislature	Western Dane County
27	Did not exist in 9th Legislature	Marathon, Portage, Waupaca, Waushara, Wood County
28	Did not exist in 9th Legislature	Burnett, Chippewa, Clark, Douglas, Dunn, La Pointe, Pierce, Polk, St. Croix counties
29	Did not exist in 9th Legislature	Marquette County
30	Did not exist in 9th Legislature	Bad Ax, Buffalo, Crawford, Jackson, La Crosse, Monroe, Tremealeau counties

=== Assembly redistricting ===
==== Summary of changes ====
- Brown County became its own assembly district, after previously having been in a shared district with Door and Kewaunee counties.
- Columbia County went from having 2 districts to 3.
- Dane County went from having 5 districts to 6.
- Fond du Lac County went from having 4 districts to 5.
- Green County went from having 1 district to 2.
- Manitowoc County went from having 1 district to 2.
- Marquette County went from having 1 district and 1 shared district with Waushara to having 2 districts.
- Outagamie County became its own assembly district, after previously having been in a shared district with Oconto and Waupaca counties.
- Rock County went from having 4 districts to 5.
- Sauk County went from sharing a district with Adams to having 2 districts of its own.
- Sheboygan County went from having 2 districts to 3.
- Walworth County went from having 6 districts to 4.
- Washington County went from having 2 districts to 3.
- Waupaca County became its own assembly district, after previously having been in a shared district with Oconto and Outagamie counties.
- Waushara County became its own assembly district, after previously having been in a shared district with Marquette
- Winnebago County went from having 2 districts to 3.

==== Assembly districts ====
County	Districts in 9th Legislature	Districts in 10th Legislature
Adams	Shared with Sauk	Shared with Juneau
Ashland	Did not exist	Shared with Burnett, Douglas, La Pointe, Polk, St. Croix
Bad Ax	Shared with Crawford	Shared with Crawford
Brown	Shared with Door, Kewaunee	1 District
Buffalo	Did not exist	Shared with Jackson, Trempealeau
Burnett	Did not exist	Shared with Ashland, Douglas, La Pointe, Polk, St. Croix
Calumet	1 District	1 District
Chippewa	Shared with La Crosse	Shared with Clark, Dunn, Pierce
Clark	Did not exist	Shared with Chippewa, Dunn, Pierce
Columbia	2 Districts	3 Districts
Crawford	Shared with Bad Ax	Shared with Bad Ax
Dane	5 Districts	6 Districts
Dodge	6 Districts	6 Districts
Door	Shared with Brown, Kewaunee	Shared with Kewaunee, Oconto
Douglas	Did not exist	Shared with Ashland, Burnett, La Pointe, Polk, St. Croix
Dunn	Did not exist	Shared with Chippewa, Clark, Pierce
Fond du Lac	4 Districts	5 Districts
Grant	5 Districts	5 Districts
Green	1 District	2 Districts
Iowa	2 Districts	2 Districts
Jackson	Did not exist	Shared with Buffalo, Trempealeau
Jefferson	5 Districts	5 Districts
Juneau	Did not exist	Shared with Adams
Kenosha	2 Districts	2 Districts
Kewaunee	Shared with Brown, Door	Shared with Door, Oconto
La Crosse	Shared with Chippewa	Shared with Monroe
La Pointe	Shared with Pierce, Polk, St. Croix	Shared with Ashland, Burnett, Douglas, Polk, St. Croix
Lafayette	3 Districts	3 Districts
Manitowoc	1 District	2 Districts
Marathon	Shared with Portage	Shared with Portage, Wood
Marquette	2 Shared with Waushara	2 Districts
Milwaukee	9 Districts	9 Districts
Monroe	Did not exist	Shared with La Crosse
Oconto	Shared with Outagamie, Waupaca	Shared with Door, Kewaunee
Outagamie	Shared with Oconto, Waupaca	1 District
Ozaukee	2 Districts	2 Districts
Pierce	Shared with La Pointe, Polk, St. Croix	Shared with Chippewa, Clark, Dunn
Polk	Shared with La Pointe, Pierce, St. Croix	Shared with Ashland, Burnett, Douglas, La Pointe, St. Croix
Portage	Shared with Marathon	Shared with Marathon, Wood
Racine	4 Districts	4 Districts
Richland	1 District	1 District
Rock	4 Districts	5 Districts
Sauk	Shared with Adams	2 Districts
Sheboygan	2 Districts	3 Districts
St. Croix	Shared with La Pointe, Pierce, Polk	Shared with Ashland, Burnett, Douglas, La Pointe, Polk
Trempealeau	Did not exist	Shared with Buffalo, Jackson
Walworth	6 Districts	4 Districts
Washington	2 Districts	3 Districts
Waukesha	4 Districts	4 Districts
Waupaca	Shared with Oconto, Outagamie	1 District
Waushara	2 Shared with Marquette	1 District
Winnebago	2 Districts	3 Districts
Wood	Did not exist	Shared with Marathon, Portage
