= 9th Wisconsin Legislature =

Wisconsin legislative term for 1856

| ← | 8th | 10th | → |
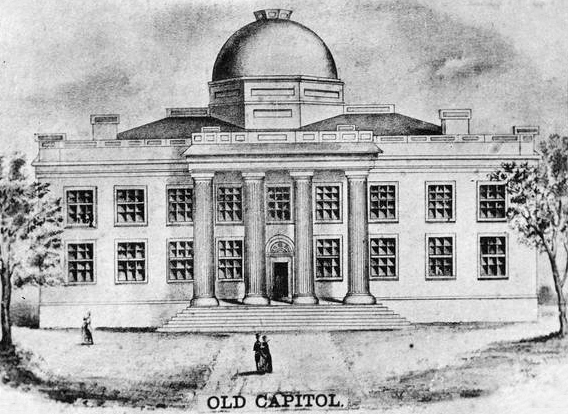
- Wisconsin State Capitol, 1855

Overview
- Legislative body: Wisconsin Legislature
- Meeting place: Wisconsin State Capitol
- Term: January 7, 1856 – January 5, 1857
- Election: November 6, 1855

Senate
- Members: 25
- Senate President: Arthur MacArthur Sr. (D)
- President pro tempore: Louis P. Harvey (R)
- Party control: Republican

Assembly
- Members: 82
- Assembly Speaker: William Hull (D)
- Party control: Democratic

Sessions
- 1st: January 9, 1856 – March 31, 1856
- 2nd: September 3, 1856 – October 14, 1856

The Ninth Wisconsin Legislature convened from January 9, 1856, to March 31, 1856, in regular session, and re-convened from September 3, 1856, to October 14, 1856.

This was a pivotal legislative session in the fall of the Democratic Party in Wisconsin and the rise of the new Republican Party—the Republicans would dominate the state government for most of the next 100 years. The start of the session saw the dispute over the 1855 Wisconsin gubernatorial election, in which the Democratic incumbent governor, William A. Barstow, was forced to resign from office three months into this term after the Wisconsin Supreme Court threw out a number of apparently fraudulent votes.

Before he left office however, Barstow was involved in an extensive railroad bribery scandal, which ultimately also implicated his Republican challenger, Coles Bashford, and a huge portion of the members of the 9th Wisconsin Legislature. The scheme saw railroad promoters, led by Milwaukee mayor Byron Kilbourn, bribing legislators and other state officials with railroad company bonds and stock in exchange for securing land grants for the La Crosse and Milwaukee Railroad route. An 1858 investigation found $900,000 worth of bribes had been paid (nearly $33,000,000 adjusted for inflation), averaging $10,000 per official. Although legislators from both parties received the corrupt bonds, Democrats ultimately took the bulk of the blame.

Senators representing even-numbered districts were newly elected for this session and were serving the first year of a two-year term. Assemblymembers were elected to a one-year term. Assemblymembers and even-numbered senators were elected in the general election of November 6, 1855. Senators representing odd-numbered districts were serving the second year of their two-year term, having been elected in the general election held on November 7, 1854.

Due to the controversies over the gubernatorial election, the governor for nearly all of this term's regular legislative session was the previous incumbent, Democrat William A. Barstow, of Waukesha County, who asserted that he was the rightful governor until March 21, 1856, when he resigned. At that time, the lieutenant governor, Democrat Arthur MacArthur Sr., of Milwaukee County, then ascended to become governor until the Wisconsin Supreme Court ruled that Republican Coles Bashford, of Winnebago County, had actually won the 1855 election and was entitled to the seat. Bashford was sworn in March 25, 1856, and served for the remainder of this legislative term, in the first year of a two-year gubernatorial term.

== Major events ==
- January 7, 1856: Resulting from a dispute over the 1855 gubernatorial election, both Coles Bashford and William A. Barstow were sworn in as Governor of Wisconsin in separate ceremonies.
- January 15, 1856: Assemblymember William Brunquest, representing Oconto, Outagamie, and Waupaca counties, resigned his seat after it was demonstrated that he had actually lost his election to Louis Bostedo.
- March 21, 1856: Barstow officially withdrew his claim to the Governorship, leaving Lieutenant Governor Arthur MacArthur Sr. as governor.
- March 24, 1856: The Wisconsin Supreme Court issued its decision in the case Atty. Gen. ex rel. Bashford v. Barstow, ruling that Bashford had won the 1855 gubernatorial election.
- March 25, 1856: Bashford was sworn in as the 5th Governor of Wisconsin. MacArthur returned to his previous office as Lieutenant Governor.
- November 4, 1856: James Buchanan was elected 15th president of the United States.

== Major legislation ==
- March 20, 1856: Act to annex a part of the county of Dodge to the county of Jefferson, 1856 Act 27
- March 22, 1856: Joint Resolution in relation to Islands in the Mississippi river, 1856 Joint Resolution 2
- March 28, 1856: Act to define the boundaries of the county of Winnebago, 1856 Act 45
- March 29, 1856: Act to divide the county of Portage and erect the county of Wood, 1856 Act 54
- March 31, 1856: Joint Resolution of the Senate and Assembly of the State of Wisconsin to the United States, in relation to the removal of the Stockbridge Indians, 1856 Joint Resolution 4
- March 31, 1856: Act to set apart and incorporate the county of Burnette, 1856 Act 94
- September 16, 1856: Joint Resolution in relation to the Stockbridge and Munsee Indians, 1856 Joint Resolution 5
- September 30, 1856: Act to apportion and district anew the Members of the Senate and Assembly of the State of Wisconsin, 1856 Act 109. Expanded the Wisconsin Senate to 30 members, and the Assembly to 97.
- October 6, 1856: Act to organize the county of Eau Claire, 1856 Act 114
- October 14, 1856: Act to regulate the boundaries of La Crosse, Jackson and Monroe Counties, 1856 Act 145

== Party summary ==
=== Senate summary ===
Senate partisan composition Democratic: 12 seats Republican: 13 seats

| | Party (Shading indicates majority caucus) | | | Total | |
| | Democratic | Ind. | Republican | Total | Vacant |
|---|---|---|---|---|---|
| End of previous Legislature | 13 | 1 | 11 | 25 | 0 |
| 1st Session | 12 | 0 | 13 | 25 | 0 |
| Final voting share | 48% | 0% | 52% | | |
| Beginning of the next Legislature | 11 | 0 | 19 | 30 | 0 |

=== Assembly summary ===
Assembly partisan composition Democratic: 47 seats Independent: 1 seat Republican: 34 seats

| | Party (Shading indicates majority caucus) | | | Total | |
| | Democratic | Ind. | Republican | Total | Vacant |
|---|---|---|---|---|---|
| End of previous Legislature | 34 | 4 | 44 | 82 | 0 |
| start of 1st Session | 45 | 1 | 36 | 82 | 0 |
| January 15 | 46 | 1 | 35 | 82 | 0 |
| Final voting share | 56.1% | 1.22% | 42.68% | | |
| Beginning of the next Legislature | 34 | 0 | 63 | 97 | 0 |

== Sessions ==
- 1st Regular session: January 9, 1856 – March 31, 1856
- 2nd Regular session: September 3, 1856 – October 14, 1856

== Leaders ==
=== Senate leadership ===
- President of the Senate: Arthur MacArthur Sr., Lieutenant Governor
- President pro tempore: Louis P. Harvey

=== Assembly leadership ===
- Speaker of the Assembly: William Hull

== Members ==
=== Members of the Senate ===
Members of the Wisconsin Senate for the Ninth Wisconsin Legislature:

Senate partisan representation Democratic: 12 seats Republican: 13 seats

| District | Counties | Senator | Party | Residence |
|---|---|---|---|---|
| 01 | Calumet, Manitowoc, Sheboygan | David Taylor | Rep. | Sheboygan |
| 02 | Brown, Door, Kewaunee, Marathon, Oconto, Outagamie, Portage, Waupaca | Perry H. Smith | Dem. | Appleton |
| 03 | Ozaukee | Bolivar G. Gill | Dem. | Grafton |
| 04 | Washington | Baruch S. Weil | Dem. | Schleisingerville |
| 05 | Milwaukee (Northern Half) | Jackson Hadley | Dem. | Milwaukee |
| 06 | Milwaukee (Southern Half) | Edward O'Neill | Dem. | Milwaukee |
| 07 | Racine | Charles Clement | Rep. | Racine |
| 08 | Kenosha | C. Latham Sholes | Rep. | Kenosha |
| 09 | Waukesha (Northern Half) | Denison Worthington | Rep. | Summit |
| 10 | Waukesha (Southern Half) | Edward Gernon | Dem. | Genesee |
| 11 | Dane | Hiram H. Giles | Rep. | Stoughton |
| 12 | Walworth | Jesse C. Mills | Rep. | Elkhorn |
| 13 | Lafayette | Charles Dunn | Dem. | Cottage Inn |
| 14 | Jefferson | S. W. Barnes | Dem. | Waterloo |
| 15 | Iowa & Richland | Amasa Cobb | Rep. | Mineral Point |
| 16 | Grant | J. Allen Barber | Rep. | Lancaster |
| 17 | Rock (Western Part) | James Sutherland | Rep. | Janesville |
| 18 | Rock (Eastern Part) | Louis P. Harvey | Rep. | Shopiere |
| 19 | Bad Ax, Buffalo, Chippewa, Clark, Crawford, Jackson, La Crosse, La Pointe, Pierce, Polk, St. Croix | William J. Gibson | Dem. | Black River Falls |
| 20 | Fond du Lac | Edward Pier | Rep. | Fond du Lac |
| 21 | Winnebago | John Fitzgerald | Dem. | Oshkosh |
| 22 | Dodge | S. L. Rose | Dem. | Beaver Dam |
| 23 | Adams, Marquette, Sauk, Waushara | Edwin B. Kelsey | Dem. | Montello |
| 24 | Green | George E. Dexter | Rep. | Monroe |
| 25 | Columbia | John Q. Adams | Rep. | Fall River |

=== Members of the Assembly ===
Members of the Assembly for the Ninth Wisconsin Legislature:

Assembly partisan representation Democratic: 47 seats Independent: 1 seat Republican: 34 seats

| Senate District | County | District | Representative | Party | Residence |
|---|---|---|---|---|---|
| 23 | Adams, Sauk | | David K. Noyes | Rep. | Baraboo |
| 19 | Bad Ax, Crawford | | Andrew Briggs | Dem. | Bad Ax |
| 02 | Brown, Door, & Kewaunee | | John Day | Dem. | Green Bay |
| 19 | Buffalo, Chippewa, & La Crosse | | Dugald D. Cameron | Rep. | La Crosse |
| 01 | Calumet | | James Cramond | Dem. | Manchester |
| 25 | Columbia | 1 | Moses M. Davis | Rep. | Portage |
| 25 | Columbia | 2 | Oliver C. Howe | Rep. | Lowville |
| 11 | Dane | 1 | Charles R. Head | Rep. | Albion |
| 11 | Dane | 2 | Augustus A. Huntington | Dem. | York |
| 11 | Dane | 3 | William M. Colladay | Rep. | Dunn |
| 11 | Dane | 4 | George P. Thompson | Dem. | Cross Plains |
| 11 | Dane | 5 | Augustus A. Bird | Dem. | Madison |
| 22 | Dodge | 1 | Benjamin F. Barney | Dem. | Williamstown |
| 22 | Dodge | 2 | Daniel Fletcher | Dem. | Hustisford |
| 22 | Dodge | 3 | Lawrence Connor | Dem. | Emmet |
| 22 | Dodge | 4 | Fred H. Ehinger | Dem. | Clyman |
| 22 | Dodge | 5 | Charles Burchard | Rep. | Beaver Dam |
| 22 | Dodge | 6 | Henry Butterfield | Rep. | Waupun |
| 20 | Fond du Lac | 1 | George W. Parker | Rep. | Metomen |
| 20 | Fond du Lac | 2 | Peter Johnson | Dem. | Ashford |
| 20 | Fond du Lac | 3 | Isaac Brown | Dem. | Fond du Lac |
| 20 | Fond du Lac | 4 | Joseph Wagner | Dem. | Marshfield |
| 16 | Grant | 1 | Allen Taylor | Rep. | Hazel Green |
| 16 | Grant | 2 | William Hull | Dem. | Potosi |
| 16 | Grant | 3 | James T. Brown | Rep. | Clifton |
| 16 | Grant | 4 | Joseph T. Mills | Rep. | Lancaster |
| 16 | Grant | 5 | Horace Catlin | Dem. | Cassville |
| 24 | Green | | Martin Flood | Rep. | Brooklyn |
| 15 | Iowa | 1 | Ephraim Knowlton | Dem. | Highland |
| 15 | Iowa | 2 | Richard M. Smith | Dem. | Mineral Point |
| 14 | Jefferson | 1 | William Chappell | Dem. | Watertown |
| 14 | Jefferson | 2 | Henry C. Drake | Rep. | Milford |
| 14 | Jefferson | 3 | David L. Morrison | Dem. | Koskonong |
| 14 | Jefferson | 4 | William W. Woodman | Dem. | Farmington |
| 14 | Jefferson | 5 | Darius Reed | Rep. | Sullivan |
| 08 | Kenosha | 1 | Henry Johnson | Rep. | Kenosha |
| 08 | Kenosha | 2 | Franklin Newell | Rep. | Paris |
| 13 | Lafayette | 1 | Matthew Murphy | Dem. | Benton |
| 13 | Lafayette | 2 | Hamilton H. Gray | Dem. | Shullsburg |
| 13 | Lafayette | 3 | James H. Knowlton | Rep. | Darlington |
| 19 | La Pointe, Pierce, Polk, & St. Croix | | Almon D. Gray | Dem. | Hudson |
| 01 | Manitowoc | | Charles H. Walker | Dem. | Manitowoc |
| 02 | Marathon, Portage | | Joseph Wood | Rep. | Grand Rapids |
| 23 | Marquette, Waushara | 1 | Horatio S. Thomas | Dem. | Moundville |
| 23 | Marquette, Waushara | 2 | William F. Chipman | Dem. | Warren |
| 05 | Milwaukee | 1 | Joshua Starks | Dem. | Milwaukee |
| 05 | Milwaukee | 2 | Augustus Greulich | Dem. | Milwaukee |
| 06 | Milwaukee | 3 | William A. Hawkins | Rep. | Milwaukee |
| 06 | Milwaukee | 4 | George Hahn | Dem. | Milwaukee |
| 06 | Milwaukee | 5 | John Mitchell | Dem. | Milwaukee |
| 06 | Milwaukee | 6 | Andrew McCormick | Dem. | Milwaukee |
| 06 | Milwaukee | 7 | Peter Lavies | Dem. | Greenfield |
| 05 | Milwaukee | 8 | Henry Crawford | Dem. | Wauwatosa |
| 05 | Milwaukee | 9 | John Tobin | Dem. | Granville |
| 02 | Oconto, Outagamie, Waupaca | | William Brunquest (until Jan. 15) | Rep. | Waupaca |
| 02 | Oconto, Outagamie, Waupaca | | Louis Bostedo (from Jan. 15) | Dem. | Weyauwega |
| 03 | Ozaukee | 1 | Charles Beger | Dem. | Port Washington |
| 03 | Ozaukee | 2 | William Vogenitz | Dem. | Cedarburg |
| 07 | Racine | 1 | Thomas Falvey | Dem. | Racine |
| 07 | Racine | 2 | Eliphalet Cram | Dem. | Racine |
| 07 | Racine | 3 | John T. Palmer | Dem. | Norway |
| 07 | Racine | 4 | Patrick G. Cheves | Rep. | Waterford |
| 15 | Richland | | Robert Aken | Ind. | Richland |
| 18 | Rock | 1 | Horatio J. Murray | Rep. | Turtle |
| 18 | Rock | 2 | John Child | Rep. | Lima |
| 17 | Rock | 3 | Levi Alden | Rep. | Janesville |
| 17 | Rock | 4 | John M. Evans | Rep. | Union |
| 01 | Sheboygan | 1 | William Whippermann | Dem. | Mosel |
| 01 | Sheboygan | 2 | Reed C. Brazelton | Rep. | Scott |
| 12 | Walworth | 1 | James Lauderdale | Rep. | La Grange |
| 12 | Walworth | 2 | Robert T. Seymour | Rep. | Lafayette |
| 12 | Walworth | 3 | John F. Potter | Rep. | East Troy |
| 12 | Walworth | 4 | Asa W. Farr | Dem. | Geneva |
| 12 | Walworth | 5 | Salmon Thomas | Rep. | Darien |
| 12 | Walworth | 6 | William D. Chapin | Rep. | Bloomfield |
| 04 | Washington | 1 | Thomas Hayes | Dem. | Richfield |
| 04 | Washington | 2 | John Sell | Dem. | Addison |
| 09 | Waukesha | 1 | Jeremiah Noon | Rep. | Merton |
| 09 | Waukesha | 2 | James Weaver | Dem. | Lisbon |
| 10 | Waukesha | 3 | John James | Dem. | Eagle |
| 10 | Waukesha | 4 | Charles S. Hawley | Rep. | Waukesha |
| 21 | Winnebago | 1 | Lucius B. Townsend | Rep. | Nepeuskun |
| 21 | Winnebago | 2 | John Anunson | Dem. | Winchester |

== Employees ==
=== Senate employees ===
- Chief Clerk: Byron Paine
- Sergeant-at-Arms: Joseph Baker

=== Assembly employees ===
- Chief Clerk: James Armstrong
- Sergeant-at-Arms: Egbert Moseley
