= David Jennings =

David Jennings may refer to:

- Dave Jennings (American football) (1952–2013), American football punter and broadcaster
- David Jennings (state representative) (1835–1906), Wisconsin state representative
- David Jennings (bishop) (born 1944), English churchman
- David Jennings (composer) (born 1972), British composer
- David Jennings (Ohio politician) (1787–1834), United States representative from Ohio
- David Jennings (cricketer) (1889–1918), English cricketer who died during the First World War
- David Jennings (tutor) (1691–1762), English dissenting tutor
- David M. Jennings (1948–2023), speaker of the Minnesota House of Representatives
- David V. Jennings (1887–1970), Wisconsin state senator
