= Daniel Howell (Wisconsin politician) =

American politician (1807–1890)

Member of the Wisconsin Senate from the 14th district
- In office January 2, 1854 – January 7, 1856
- Preceded by: Alva Stewart
- Succeeded by: S. W. Barnes

Treasurer of Jefferson County, Wisconsin
- In office January 1, 1853 – January 1, 1855
- Preceded by: Myron Smith
- Succeeded by: Nelson Fryer

Personal details
- Born: October 26, 1807 Franklin, New York, US
- Died: December 2, 1890 (aged 83) Waukesha, Wisconsin, US
- Resting place: Prairie Home Cemetery, Waukesha, Wisconsin, US
- Party: Democratic
- Spouse: Elizabeth Jones (m. 1828–1890)
- Relatives: William Townsend (nephew)
- Occupation: Hotelier, merchant

Military service
- Branch/service: United States Volunteers; Union Army
- Years of service: 1861–1863
- Rank: Captain, USV
- Unit: 12th Reg. Wis. Vol. Infantry
- Battles/wars: American Civil War

Daniel Howell (October 26, 1807 – December 2, 1890) was an American businessman, Democratic politician, and Wisconsin pioneer. He was a member of the Wisconsin Senate, representing Jefferson County during the 1854 and 1855 terms.

== Biography ==
Daniel Howell was born in Delaware County, New York, and grew up on his family's farm. In 1832, he was one of the co-founders of a town in Chautauqua County, New York, and established the post office there, known then as Salem X Roads.

In 1835, he went west to the Michigan Territory, establishing a hotel in the village of White Pigeon, Michigan, which he operated until 1839. Over the next decade, he operated a hotel in Belvidere, Illinois, and then another in Rockford, before settling in Jefferson, Wisconsin, where he operated the Jefferson House hotel for several years.

In Jefferson County, he was elected as county treasurer in 1852, and then was elected to the Wisconsin Senate in 1853, running on the Democratic Party ticket. He represented Jefferson County in the Senate during the 1854 and 1855 sessions. His reputation was damaged by this political service due to his support of Governor William A. Barstow—he was counted among the "forty thieves" accused of participating in bribery scandals with Barstow.

After the 1855 session, he moved to Milwaukee, and finally, in 1859, he moved to the then-remote town of Grand Rapids, Wisconsin, where he operated a merchant business.

At the outbreak of the American Civil War, he left his business and raised a company of volunteers for the Union Army, known as the "Evergreens". His company was enrolled as Company G of the 12th Wisconsin Infantry Regiment, and Howell was commissioned as captain of the company. Howell led his company through the first two years of the war, participating in mostly guard and logistics duty in Tennessee and Kentucky.

He resigned due to illness in March 1863 and returned to Wisconsin, residing at Waukesha, Wisconsin. For a few years after returning, he operated another hotel in partnership with his brother-in-law, Foskett Maynard Putney. He subsequently worked in freight forwarding and sold agricultural equipment until his retirement. He was said to have "made and lost several fortunes".

== Personal life and family ==
Daniel Howell's father died when he was young, and his mother Mary (née McGregor) remarried with Simeon Mulford. Two of Howell's sisters also moved to Waukesha County. His younger sister, Clarissa, married Foskett Maynard Putney, an important pioneer of Waukesha, Wisconsin. Clarissa's son, Frank Howell Putney, served in Daniel Howell's company in the Civil War and served as an adjutant and staff officer near the end of the war; he later became prominent in politics, served as private secretary to Wisconsin Governor Harrison Ludington, and served as county judge.

Daniel Howell was also an uncle of New York lawyer and politician William Townsend, through Townsend's mother, Howell's half-sister Sarah (née Mulford) Townsend.

Daniel Howell married Elizabeth Jones at Sidney, New York, on September 21, 1828. They had no known children.

For many years he was active in Freemasonry, was one of the charter members of the Knights Templar of Milwaukee, and held the rank of grand master at one point. He died at his home in Waukesha on the morning of December 2, 1890.

Wisconsin Senate
Preceded by Alva Stewart	Member of the Wisconsin Senate from the 14th district January 2, 1854 – January 7, 1856	Succeeded by S. W. Barnes
Political offices
Preceded by Myron Smith	Treasurer of Jefferson County, Wisconsin; January 1, 1853 – January 1, 1855	Succeeded by Nelson Fryer
