= Louis Bostedo =

American businessman and politician (1798–1878)

Member of the Wisconsin State Assembly from the Oconto–Outagamie–Waupaca district
- In office January 15, 1856 – January 5, 1857
- Preceded by: William Brunquest
- Succeeded by: District abolished

1st Village President of Weyauwega, Wisconsin
- In office April 1856 – April 1857
- Preceded by: Position established

Personal details
- Born: 1798 New Jersey, U.S.
- Died: December 31, 1877 (aged 79) Weyauwega, Wisconsin, U.S.
- Party: Democratic
- Occupation: Businessman, mill owner

Louis Bostedo (1798 – December 31, 1877) was an American businessman, politician, and Wisconsin pioneer. He was one of the earliest American settlers at Weyauwega, Wisconsin, and served as the first president of the village of Weyauwega. He also served one term in the Wisconsin State Assembly, representing the large sparsely populated district (comprising Oconto, Outagamie, Shawano and Waupaca counties) in the 9th Wisconsin Legislature (1856).

== Early life and career ==
Bostedo was born in New Jersey and was a partner in a mill and dam. Bostedo came to Waupaca County in 1851, being one of the first settlers of Weyauwega. In 1855 he was a member of the Waupaca County Board of Supervisors from Weyauwega. He was the first village president of Waupaca.

== Legislative election and service ==
After the 1855 election, the Assembly seat for Oconto, Outagamie, Shawano and Waupaca counties was initially awarded to William Brunquest. Bostedo successfully challenged the result, with both claimants admitting that Bostedo had received the majority of the vote.

Bostedo was a Democrat. He succeeded fellow Democrat Perry H. Smith and was succeeded by Democrat Benjamin F. Phillips.

== After the Assembly ==
Bostedo remained on the county board; was a founder and president of the Old Settlers' Society of Waupaca County when that body organized in 1872, retaining the office until his death in 1878.

He was reported as a newly elected vice-president of the Ripon and Wolf River Rail Road Company in 1858. That railroad had been chartered by the legislature during his term of office.
