= Northport, Wisconsin =

Northport is the name of several places in the U.S. state of Wisconsin:

- Northport, Door County, Wisconsin
- Northport, Waupaca County, Wisconsin
