= Sisson's Peony Gardens =

- U.S. National Register of Historic Places
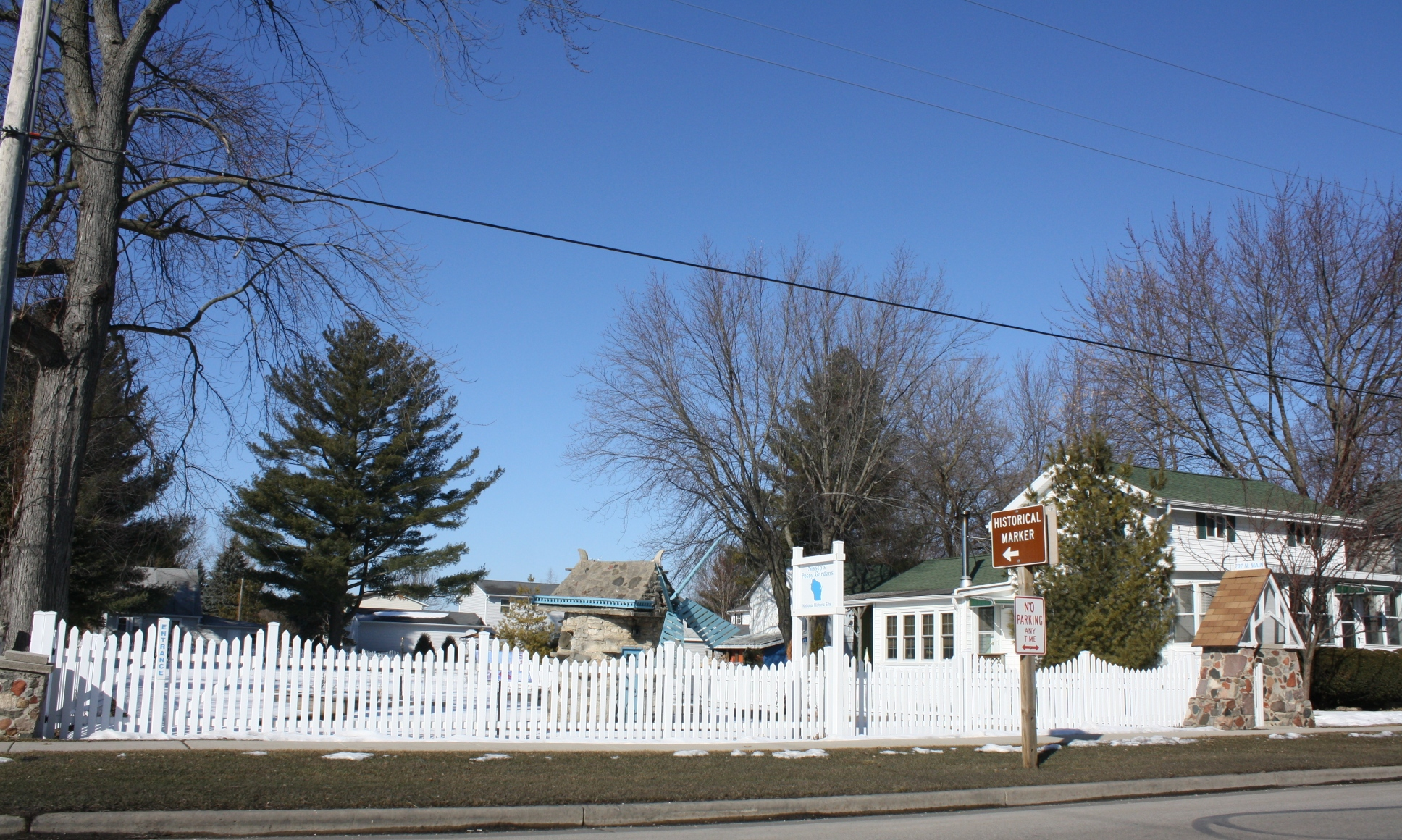
- Location: 207 N. Main St. Rosendale, Wisconsin
- Coordinates: 43.80944°N 88.67554°W
- NRHP reference No.: 06001193
- Added to NRHP: December 22, 2006

Sisson's Peony Gardens is located in Rosendale, Wisconsin. The site was added to the National Register of Historic Places in 2006.

== History ==
Wilbur Sisson began growing peony plants in his sister's yard after his retirement in 1918. Sisson found success in selling the plants and expanded the gardens. In 2005, the Rosendale Historical Society purchased the site.

== Images ==
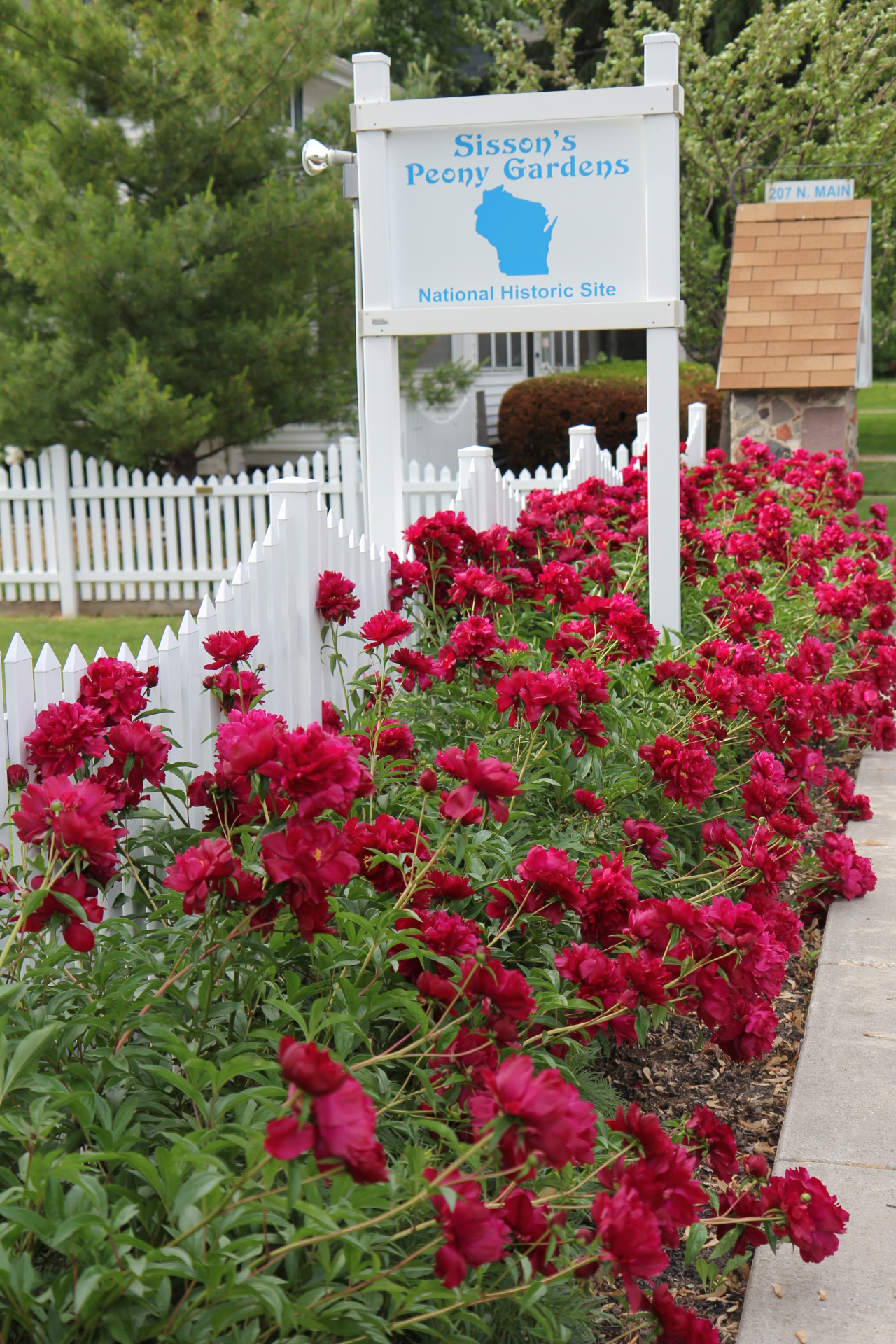
Peonies along sidewalk in 2014

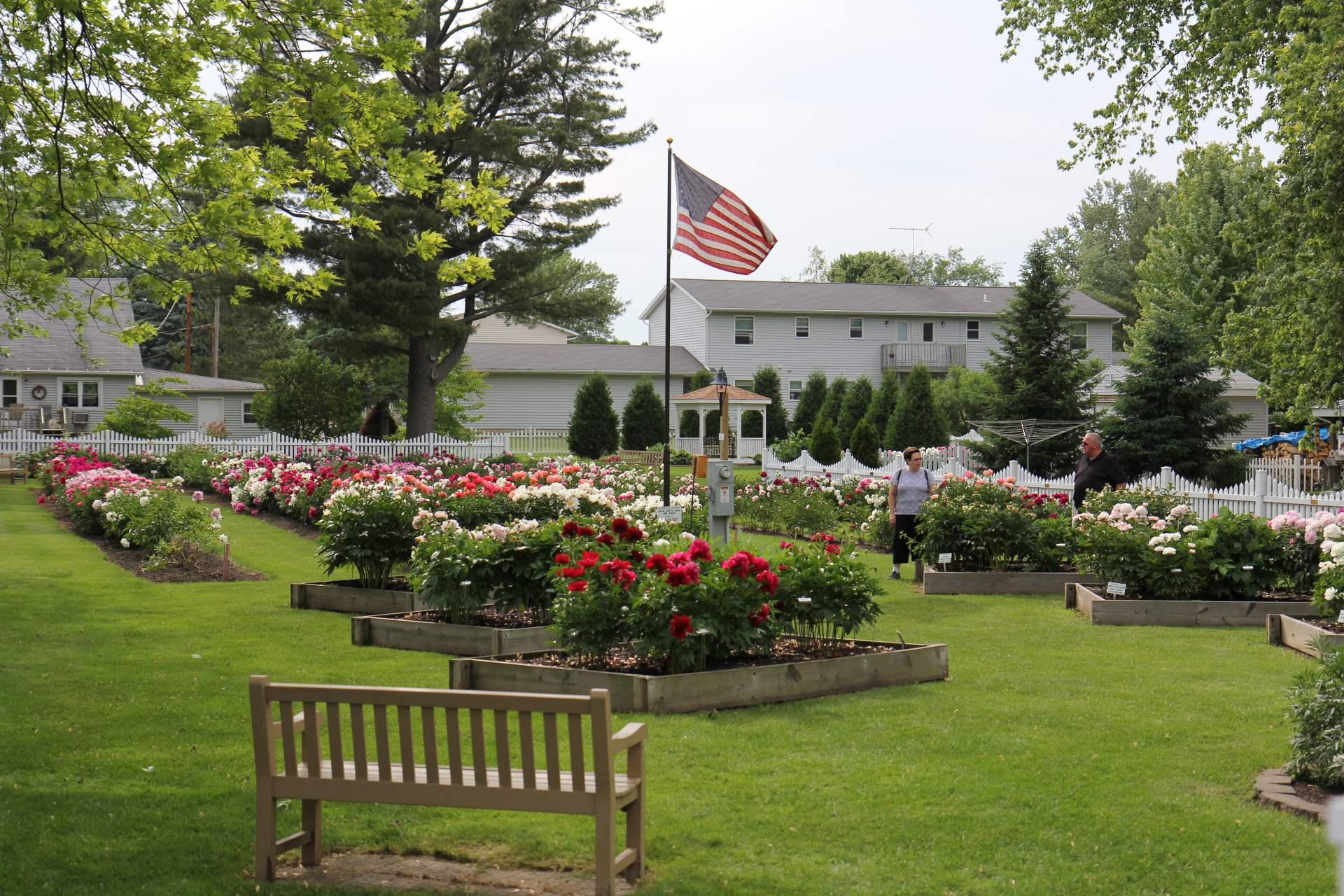
Yard during 2014 bloom
