= S. W. Barnes =

19th century American politician

Member of the Wisconsin Senate from the 14th district
- In office January 7, 1856 – January 4, 1858
- Preceded by: Daniel Howell
- Succeeded by: William Chappell

Personal details
- Born: May 23, 1824 Turin, New York, U.S.
- Died: October 24, 1862 (aged 38) Utica, New York, U.S.
- Resting place: Forest Hill Cemetery, Utica, New York
- Party: Democratic
- Spouse: Cornelia Augusta Chevalier (died 1901)
- Children: Cornelia Marion (Ralph); (b. 1854; died 1936)
- Profession: Lawyer, engineer

Military service
- Allegiance: United States
- Branch/service: United States Volunteers; Union Army
- Years of service: 1861–1862
- Rank: 1st Lieutenant, USV
- Unit: 30th Reg. N.Y. Vol. Infantry
- Battles/wars: American Civil War

Sylvester Wallace Barnes (May 23, 1824 – October 24, 1862) was an American lawyer, engineer, and politician. He was a member of the Wisconsin Senate, representing Jefferson County during the 1856 and 1857 sessions. In contemporary documents, his name was almost always abbreviated as S. W. Barnes. He died of disease due to service in the American Civil War.

== Biography ==
S. W. Barnes was born in 1824, in the town of Turin, New York. He moved to Wisconsin sometime before 1853, and settled in Watertown, in Jefferson County. In Watertown, he was deeply involved in establishing the Watertown & Madison Railroad.

Barnes was elected to the Wisconsin Senate in 1855, running on the Democratic Party ticket. He represented Jefferson County in the 1856 and 1857 sessions. Barnes' political and financial interests intersected in the plan to extend the Watertown & Madison Railroad to the Mississippi River. This ambitious plan was wrecked by the Panic of 1857, which led to the failure of the Watertown & Madison Railroad and Barnes' financial ruin.

Following his failures in Wisconsin, Barnes returned to New York. He was at Troy, New York, at the outbreak of the American Civil War, and volunteered for service in the Union Army. He was enrolled as first lieutenant of Company H in the 30th New York Infantry Regiment. While serving with the regiment around Washington, D.C., in the early months of the war, he became severely ill. He was sent back to his family in Utica, New York, where he died on October 24, 1862.

Sixty years after his death, the U.S. House of Representatives voted to upgrade him to an honorable discharge.

== Personal life and family ==
Barnes was the son of Abraham A. and Lucinda (née Topping) Barnes. The Barnes were descended from Thomas Barnes, a signatory of the New Haven Colony constitution of 1644. His maternal ancestors traced their lineage back to Thomas Topping, who represented Wethersfield in the Connecticut General Court in the 1630s and was a signatory of the Hempstead Convention in 1665.

S. W. Barnes married Cornelia Augusta Chevalier. They had one daughter.

Wisconsin Senate
Preceded by Daniel Howell	Member of the Wisconsin Senate from the 14th district January 7, 1856 – January 4, 1858	Succeeded by William Chappell
