= William T. Innis =

American politician

William Thompson Innis (June 27, 1826 – November 16, 1901) was an American farmer and politician.

Born in Newburgh, New York, Innis moved to Wisconsin in 1849. He settled in the community of West Rosendale within the town of Rosendale, Fond du Lac County, Wisconsin where he was a farmer. He was president of a farmers' club and director of a farmers' insurance business. Innis was a Republican, and served as chairman of the Rosendale Town Board. He also served in the Wisconsin State Assembly in 1877. Eventually, he moved to Ripon, Wisconsin in 1891. In 1901, Innis died at his daughter's house in Pickett, Wisconsin.
