= Joseph Langworthy =

Joseph Langworthy (died July 7, 1871) was an American farmer and politician from Juneau County, Wisconsin.

== Life ==
In July 1856, Langworthy was living in Mauston, and was elected as chairman of the mass meeting of the Republican Party in what was then Adams County (soon to be divided into Adams and Juneau counties). In November 1856 he was elected as a Republican member of the Wisconsin State Assembly, representing the newly created Assembly district for Adams and Juneau counties in the 10th Wisconsin Legislature of 1857. He did not seek re-election, and was succeeded by fellow Republican Almon P. Ayers.

During the American Civil War, he served as the Captain of the Juneau County Light Guard of the Wisconsin State Militia.

== Later life and death ==
An active farmer, he served for some years as president of the Juneau County agricultural society. He died July 7, 1871, when he was gored to death by a bull he owned. At the time of his death he had been living in Lindina. He was buried in the cemetery in Mauston.
