= Wynn Edwards =

American politician

Wynn Edwards (November 9, 1842 – August 7, 1900) was an American farmer and politician.

Born near Ruthin, Wales, Edwards emigrated to the United States and settled in the town of Rosendale, Wisconsin, where he farmed. He took a business course at Byrant & Stratton College in Chicago, Illinois. Edwards served in the 21st Wisconsin Volunteer Infantry Regiment during the American Civil War. Edwards served as chairman and treasurer of the town of Rosendale, Wisconsin. He also served as postmaster of Rosendale. Edwards served in the Wisconsin State Assembly in 1897 and was a Republican. Edwards died of a heart ailment in a hotel in Oshkosh, Wisconsin while there to consult a physician.
