= West Rosendale, Wisconsin =

- Unincorporated community
- Location within Wisconsin Location within the United States
- Coordinates: 43°49′21″N 88°43′30″W
- Country: United States
- State: Wisconsin
- County: Fond du Lac
- Elevation: 925 ft (282 m)
- Time zone: UTC-6 (Central (CST))
  - Summer (DST): UTC-5 (CDT)
- Area code: 920
- GNIS feature ID: 1577880

West Rosendale is an unincorporated community in the town of Rosendale, Fond du Lac County, Wisconsin, United States.

== Notable people ==
Notable people who were born or lived in West Rosendale include:

- Henry C. Bottum (1826–1913), farmer and politician
- William T. Innis (1826–1901), Wisconsin legislator and farmer
