= Rosendale (town), Wisconsin =

Town in Fond du Lac County, Wisconsin

Rosendale, Wisconsin
- Town
- Town of Rosendale
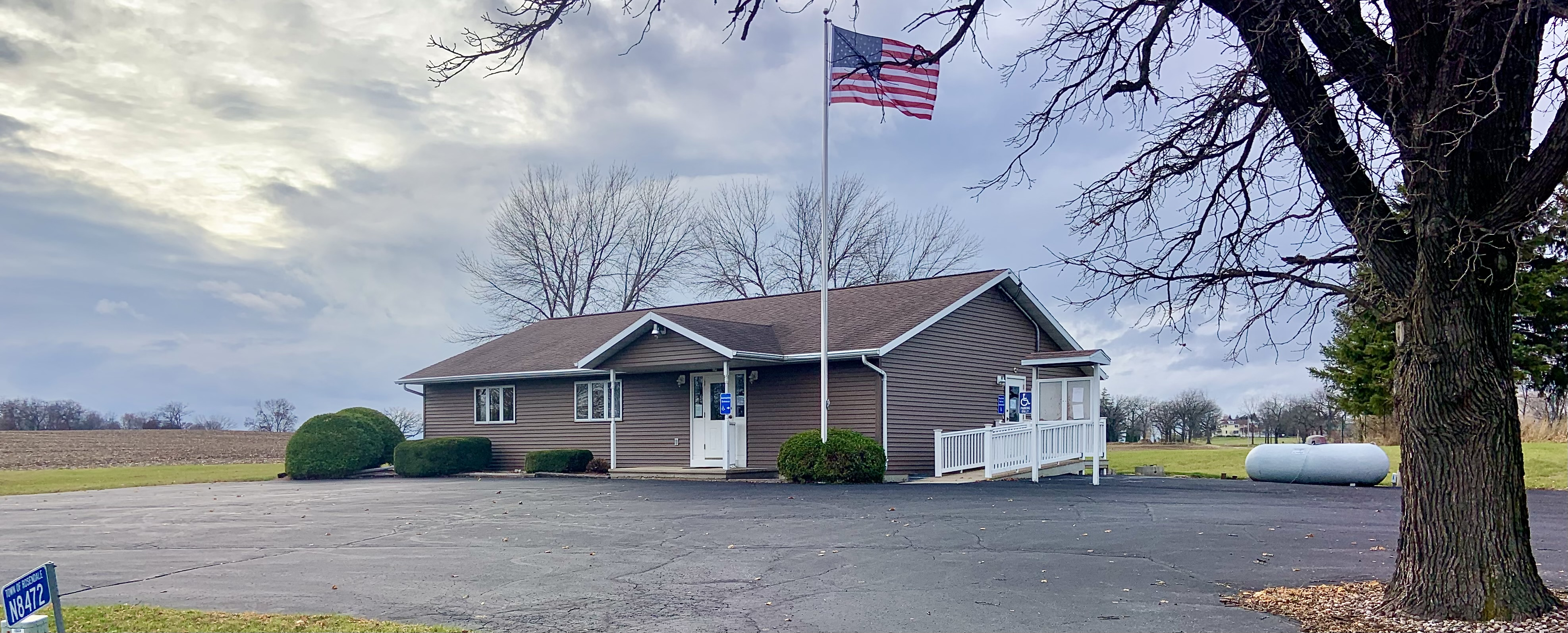
- Rosendale Town Hall

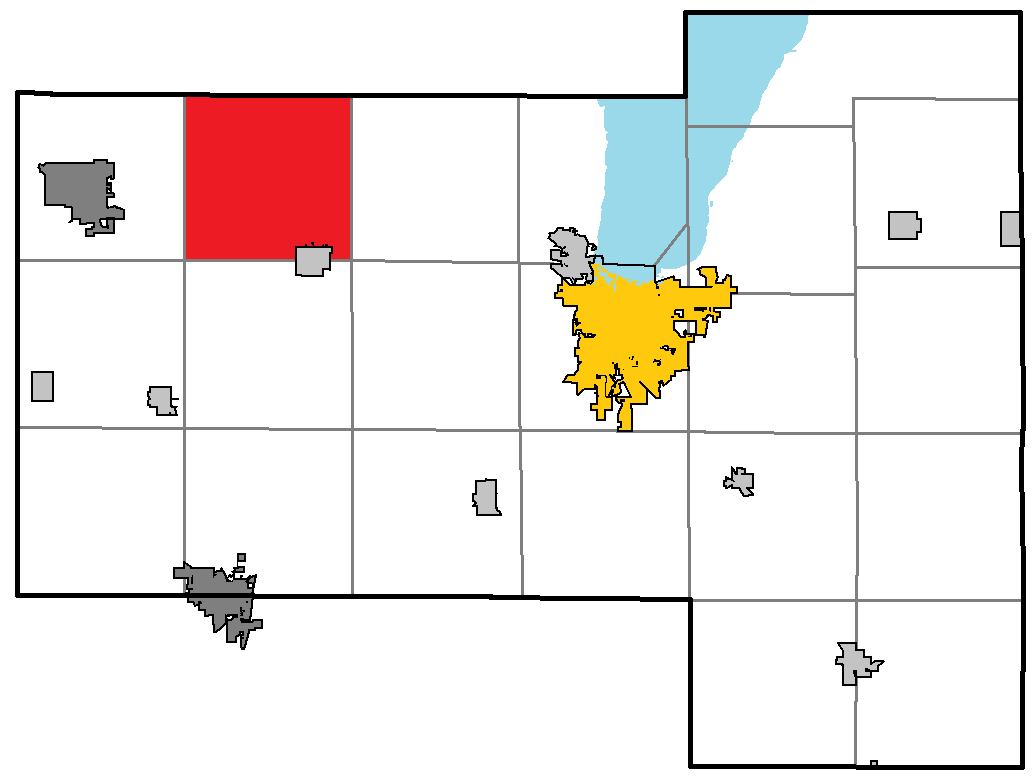
- Location of Rosendale, within Fond du Lac County
- Coordinates: 43°50′57″N 88°42′09″W
- Country: United States
- State: Wisconsin
- County: Fond du Lac

Area
  - Total: 35.54 sq mi (92.0 km^{2})
  - Land: 35.14 sq mi (91.0 km^{2})
  - Water: 0.40 sq mi (1.0 km^{2})

Population (2020)
  - Total: 738
  - Density: 21.0/sq mi (8.11/km^{2})
- Time zone: UTC-6 (Central (CST))
  - Summer (DST): UTC-5 (CDT)
- Area code(s): 920 & 274
- GNIS feature ID: 1584065

Rosendale is a town in Fond du Lac County, Wisconsin, United States. The population was 738 at the 2020 census. The village of Rosendale is located partially within the town. The unincorporated communities of Rosendale Center and West Rosendale are also located in the town.

== Geography ==
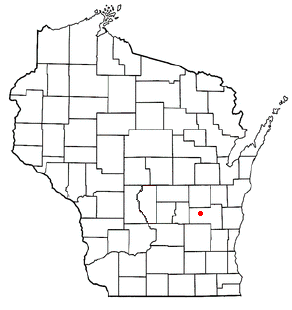
Location of Rosendale, Wisconsin

According to the United States Census Bureau, the town has a total area of 35.7 square miles (92.3 km^{2}), of which 35.6 square miles (92.3 km^{2}) is land and 0.04 square mile (0.1 km^{2}) (0.08%) is water.

== Demographics ==
As of the census of 2000, there were 783 people, 284 households, and 222 families residing in the town. The population density was 22.0 people per square mile (8.5/km^{2}). There were 300 housing units at an average density of 8.4 per square mile (3.3/km^{2}). The racial makeup of the town was 98.47% White, 0.64% Native American, 0.64% from other races, and 0.26% from two or more races. 0.64% of the population were Hispanic or Latino of any race.

There were 284 households, out of which 34.2% had children under the age of 18 living with them, 68.0% were married couples living together, 5.3% had a female householder with no husband present, and 21.5% were non-families. 16.2% of all households were made up of individuals, and 7.0% had someone living alone who was 65 years of age or older. The average household size was 2.76 and the average family size was 3.11.

In the town, the population was spread out, with 26.3% under the age of 18, 6.6% from 18 to 24, 32.3% from 25 to 44, 22.2% from 45 to 64, and 12.5% who were 65 years of age or older. The median age was 37 years. For every 100 females, there were 102.8 males. For every 100 females over the age of 18, there were 105.3 males.

The median income for a household in the town was $50,272, and the median income for a family was $53,125. Males had a median income of $35,391 versus $23,229 for females. The per capita income for the town was $20,404. About 2.6% of families and 3.3% of the population were below the poverty line, including 5.3% of those under age 18 and 6.9% of those age 65 or over.

== Notable people ==
- Jonathan Daugherty, businessman and legislator
- Wynn Edwards, farmer and legislator
- William T. Innis, farmer and legislator
- Bertine Pinckney, legislator
- Charles F. Simmons, farmer and legislator
