= Lucius G. Fisher =

Lucius G. Fisher (August 17, 1808–March 5, 1886) was an American politician and businessman who lived most of his life in Beloit, Wisconsin (of which he was an early settler, arriving prior to Wisconsin statehood). Fisher worked as a state legislator, local politician, congregationalist, postmaster, teacher, sheriff and sheriff's deputy, farmer, salesman, businessman, and real estate investor.

== Early life and career ==
Fisher was born August 17, 1808 in Derby, Vermont. At the age of sixteen, Fisher made a decision to move out West but delayed his plans in order due to family matters. He worked as a school teacher and as a sheriff's deputy until 1834, when he was hired to a sales position that allowed him to travel. Amid the Panic of 1837, he lost this job.

== Life and career in Beloit, Wisconsin ==
After losing his sales job, he traveled west to Chicago and later traveled further, traveling to the Wisconsin Territory in search of work. He worked in various short-term jobs before purchasing land in the Wisconsin town of New Albany (located in Rock County). An early settler of the town, he played a role in the decision to rename it Beloit.

In 1839, Fisher was appointed sheriff of Rock County, holding the office for six years. He also worked as a road commissioner, having been appointed to that role by the Wisconsin Territory Legislative Assembly in 1840.

Fisher married Caroline Field in June 1842. In their marriage, they had at least two children. She died in 1850, and Fisher re-married to Rachel Colton in October 1851. With his second wife, he had three daughters.

Fisher invested in numerous private businesses ventures. For roughly a year, he owned a dry goods venture and flour mill, selling these assets quickly after coming into ownership of them. He was a contractor for several railroads, and was a member of the board of directors of the Beloit and Madison Railroad. He invested in real estate as well. Fisher amassed significant. wealth. By 1860, he was the owner of $91,500 in real estate and $114,500 in personal property.

Fisher was among the original founders and inaugural trustees of Beloit College.

In 1856, he was elected as a Republican to the Wisconsin State Legislature, representing Rock County's first district in the Wisconsin State Assembly during the 10th Wisconsin Legislature. He declined to seek re-election, citing a desire to focus on his business ventures.

After leaving the state legislature, Fisher was elected an alderman (city council member) in Beloit, and later a Rock County supervisor.

In 1861, he was appointed by President Abraham Lincoln to serve as the postmaster of Beloit. He held this position until 1867, when he was removed by President Andrew Johnson.

Fisher died March 5, 1886 in Beloit.
