= George Cairncross =

American politician

George Cairncross (July 1, 1812 – January 21, 1891) was an American farmer from Lisbon, Wisconsin who served a single one-year term as a member of the Wisconsin State Assembly and in various local offices. He was a founding member of the Republican Party.

== Background ==
Cairncross was born in Midlothian, Scotland on July 1, 1812. He received a liberal education in his homeland, and in 1842 emigrated to the United States. He settled in Lisbon, where he would live for the rest of his life. In October 1845, he married Amy M. Allen, a native of Conneaut, Ohio.

== Public office ==
In 1857 he became a member of the State Assembly for the 2nd Waukesha County Assembly district (the Towns of Lisbon, Menomonee, and Merton) for the 1857 session (the 10th Wisconsin Legislature). He was succeeded by fellow Republican Oliver P. Hullett.

He held various local offices, including serving on the town board, the county board of supervisors and for 13 years as a county superintendent of the poor.

== Private life ==
The Cairncrosses remained on their farm, "Forest Home", in Section 32 of Lisbon, and had three sons and one daughter before Amy's death in 1870 at the age of 48. By 1880, he was retired from active business, "living in ease and comfort" at the farm. He died January 22, 1895.
