= Charles F. Simmons (politician) =

American politician

Charles F. Simmons (March 17, 1858 – November 2, 1897) was an American politician and farmer.

Born in the town of Nekimi, Winnebago County, Wisconsin, Simmons went to Oshkosh High School and then graduated from Oshkosh Business School in 1877 in Oshkosh, Wisconsin. Simmons was a farmer and lived in the town of Nekimi. In 1880, Simmons moved to the town of Rosendale, Fond du Lac County, Wisconsin, and continued to farm. Simmons served on the Rosendale Town Board and also served as chairman of the town board. He also served as the Rosendale Town Clerk and as justice of the peace. In 1889, Simmons served in the Wisconsin State Assembly and was a Republican. In 1893, Simmons suffered from influenza which developed into lung problems. In 1897, Simmons traveled with his wife to Tucson, Arizona Territory, to see if the climate would improve his health. Simmons died in Tucson as a result of the trip. Simmons was buried in Wisconsin.
