= Rosendale, Wisconsin =

- Village
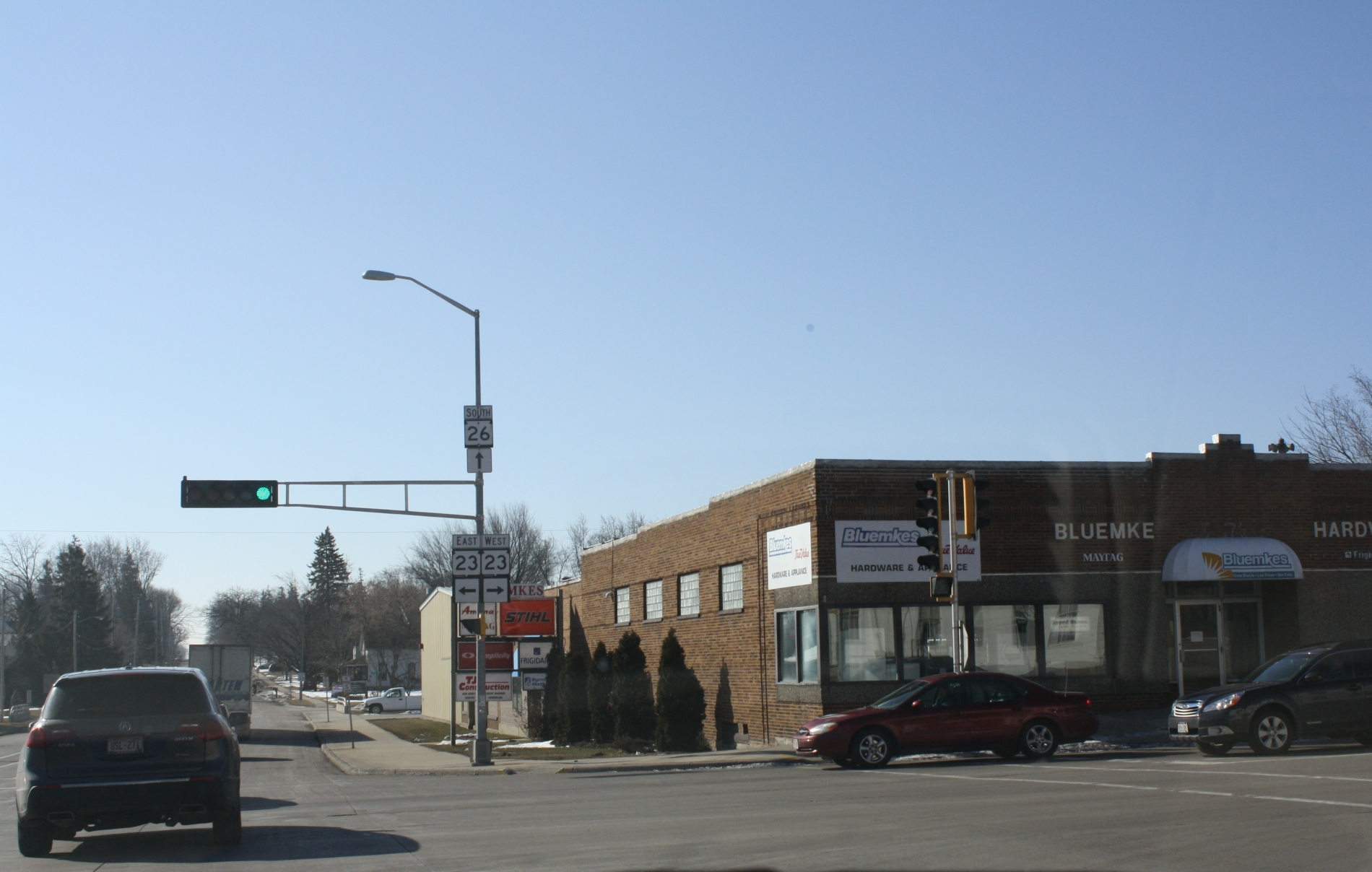
- Downtown Rosendale at the intersection of WIS 23 / WIS 26

- Location of Rosendale in Fond du Lac County, Wisconsin.
- Coordinates: 43.8079023°N 88.6732279°W
- Country: United States
- State: Wisconsin
- County: Fond du Lac

Area
  - Total: 1.24 sq mi (3.20 km^{2})
  - Land: 1.23 sq mi (3.19 km^{2})
  - Water: 0.0039 sq mi (0.01 km^{2})
- Elevation: 873 ft (266 m)

Population (2020)
  - Total: 1,039
  - Density: 837.9/sq mi (323.51/km^{2})
- Time zone: UTC-6 (Central (CST))
  - Summer (DST): UTC-5 (CDT)
- Zip Codes: 54974
- Area code: 920
- FIPS code: 55-69550
- GNIS feature ID: 1572611
- Website: villageofrosendale.com

Rosendale is a village in Fond du Lac County, Wisconsin, United States. The population was 1,039 at the 2020 census. The village is located partially within the Town of Rosendale and partially within the Town of Springvale.

== History ==
The village was named for the wild rose bushes growing in a dale near the original town site. The village is also known for the Sisson Peony Garden which has been an impact to the village throughout the years.

== Geography ==
Rosendale is located at 43°48′34″N 88°40′23″W (43.80962, -88.673154).

According to the United States Census Bureau, the village has a total area of 1.22 square miles (3.16 km^{2}), all land.

== Demographics ==
Historical population
| Census | Pop. | Note | %± |
|---|---|---|---|
| 1920 | 305 | | — |
| 1930 | 305 | | 0.0% |
| 1940 | 317 | | 3.9% |
| 1950 | 388 | | 22.4% |
| 1960 | 415 | | 7.0% |
| 1970 | 464 | | 11.8% |
| 1980 | 725 | | 56.3% |
| 1990 | 777 | | 7.2% |
| 2000 | 923 | | 18.8% |
| 2010 | 1,063 | | 15.2% |
| 2020 | 1,039 | | −2.3% |
U.S. Decennial Census

=== 2020 census ===
As of the census of 2020, there were 1,039 people, 400 households, and 267 families living in the village. The population density was 837.9 inhabitants per square mile (323.5/km^{2}). There were 413 housing units at an average density of 333 per square mile (128.6/km^{2}). The racial makeup of the village was 93.8% White, 0.3% African American, 0.5% Native American, 0.1% Asian, 2.6% from other races, and 2.6% from two or more races. Hispanic or Latino of any race were 2.9% of the population.

=== 2010 census ===
As of the census of 2010, there were 1,063 people, 407 households, and 299 families living in the village. The population density was 871.3 inhabitants per square mile (336.4/km^{2}). There were 417 housing units at an average density of 341.8 per square mile (132.0/km^{2}). The racial makeup of the village was 96.0% White, 0.2% African American, 0.9% Native American, 0.4% Asian, 1.7% from other races, and 0.8% from two or more races. Hispanic or Latino of any race were 3.0% of the population.

=== 2000 census ===
As of the census of 2000, there were 923 people, 325 households, and 261 families living in the village. The population density was 824.3 people per square mile (318.2/km^{2}). There were 339 housing units at an average density of 302.7 per square mile (116.9/km^{2}). The racial makeup of the village was 99.67% White, 0.11% Native American, and 0.22% from two or more races. 0.33% of the population were Hispanic or Latino of any race.

There were 325 households, out of which 42.2% had children under the age of 18 living with them, 71.1% were married couples living together, 6.5% had a female householder with no husband present, and 19.4% were non-families. 13.8% of all households were made up of individuals, and 7.4% had someone living alone who was 65 years of age or older. The average household size was 2.84 and the average family size was 3.15.

In the village, the population was spread out, with 29.4% under the age of 18, 9.1% from 18 to 24, 30.3% from 25 to 44, 22.5% from 45 to 64, and 8.7% who were 65 years of age or older. The median age was 34 years. For every 100 females, there were 94.7 males. For every 100 females age 18 and over, there were 97.6 males.

The median income for a household in the village was $52,448, and the median income for a family was $57,083. Males had a median income of $38,125 versus $26,250 for females. The per capita income for the village was $18,653. About 0.4% of families and 2.3% of the population were below the poverty line, including 3.8% of those under age 18 and none of those age 65 or over.

== Transportation ==
Rosendale is located along Highways 23 and 26. Wis 23 heads west to Ripon and east to Fond du Lac. Wis 26 heads north to Oshkosh and south to Waupun, and is designated as an alternate route for Interstate 41. The junction of 23 and 26 was formerly controlled by stop signs, which caused long backups at peak traffic times but now has a traffic signal.

Rosendale has a reputation of being a speed trap with a police department that heavily enforces traffic laws.

== National Register of Historic Places listings ==
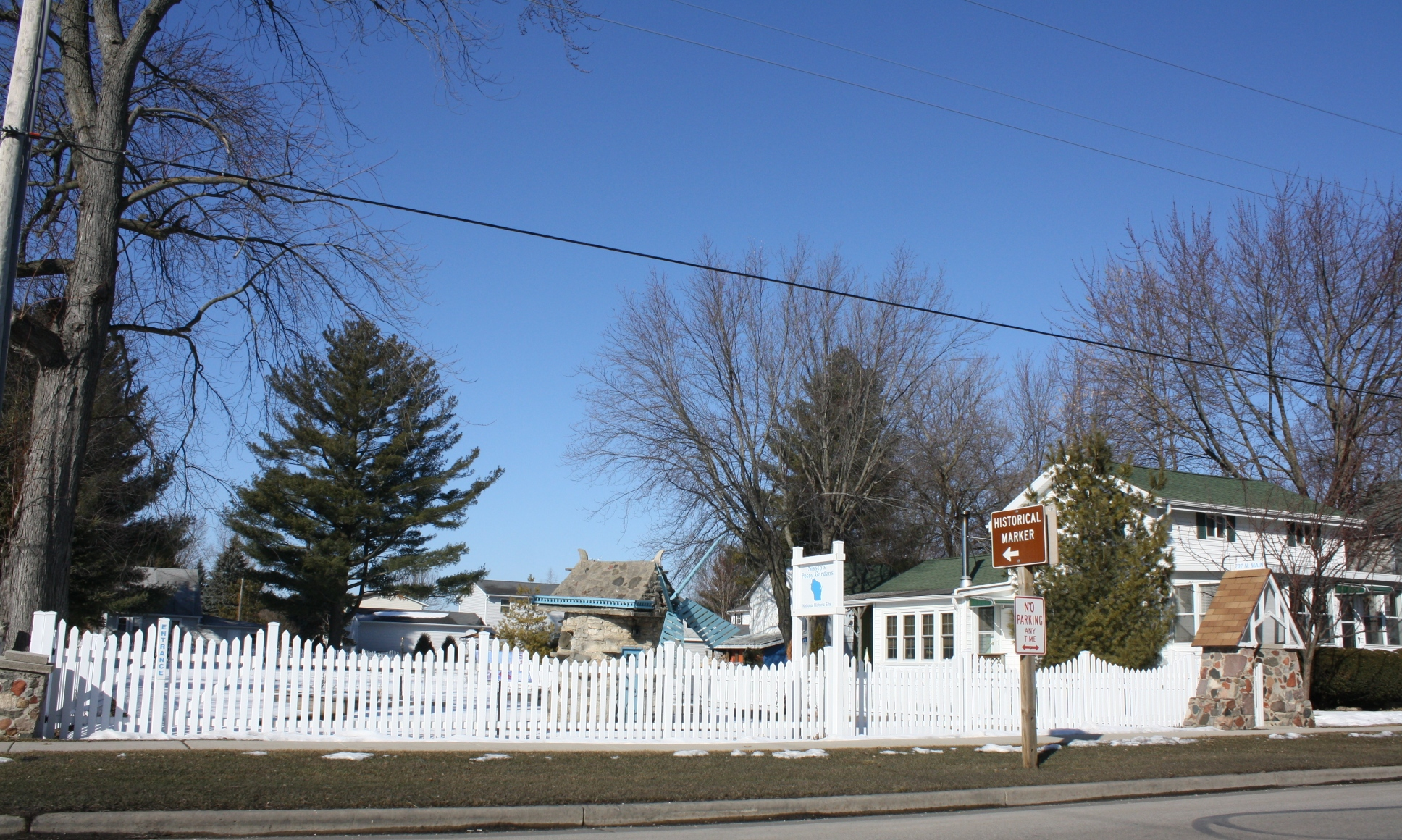
Sisson's Peony Gardens

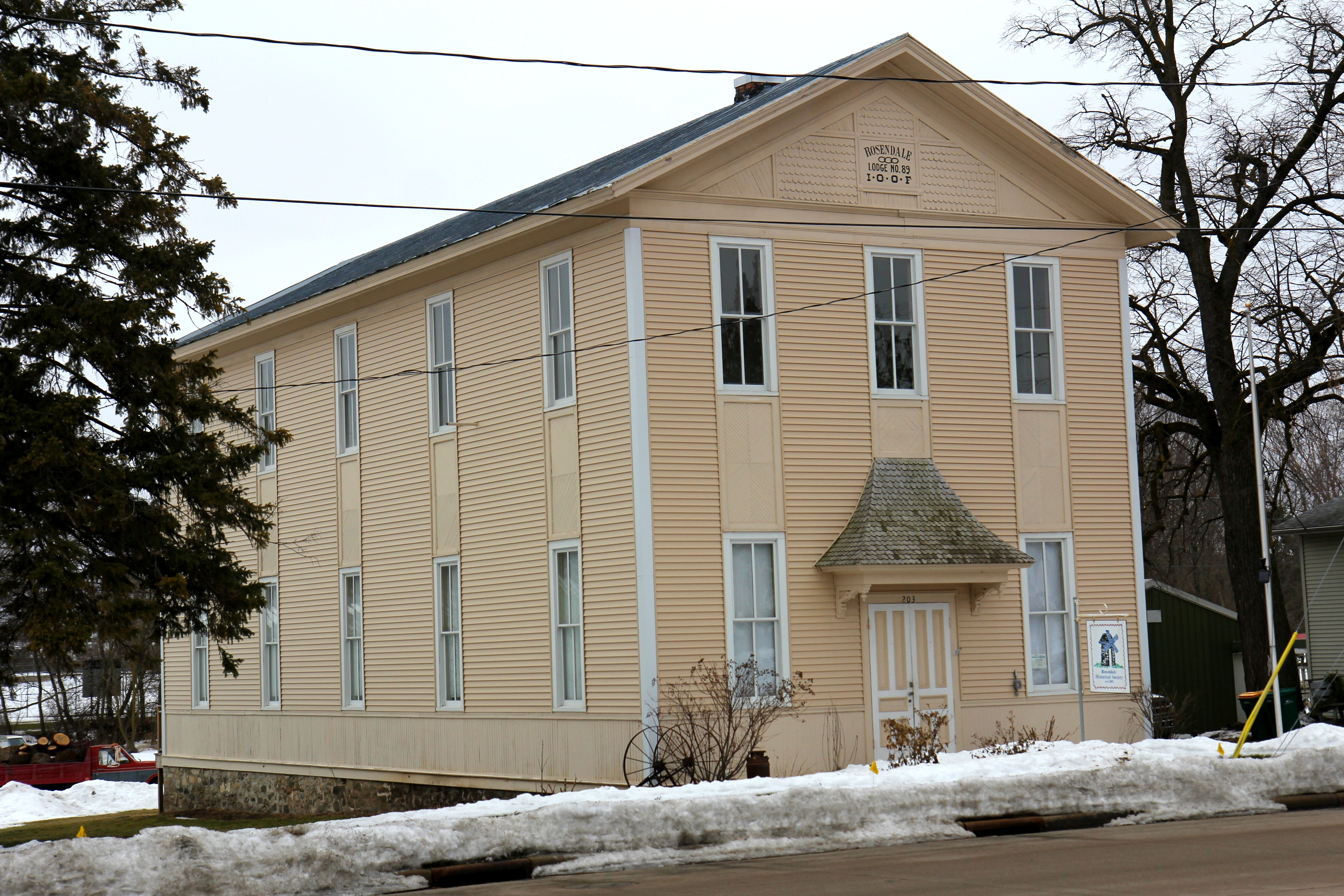
Independent Order of Odd Fellows Lodge No. 89

Rosendale is home to Sisson's Peony Gardens, listed on the National Register of Historic Places. Open for public viewing, the gardens hold an annual Peony Sunday in early June.

The Rosendale Historical Society headquarters on Main Street has been used for a museum since 2001. It is housed in the former Independent Order of Odd Fellows Lodge No. 89 which was added to the National Register in 2016. The society houses collections about the history of the village and surrounding areas.

== Images ==
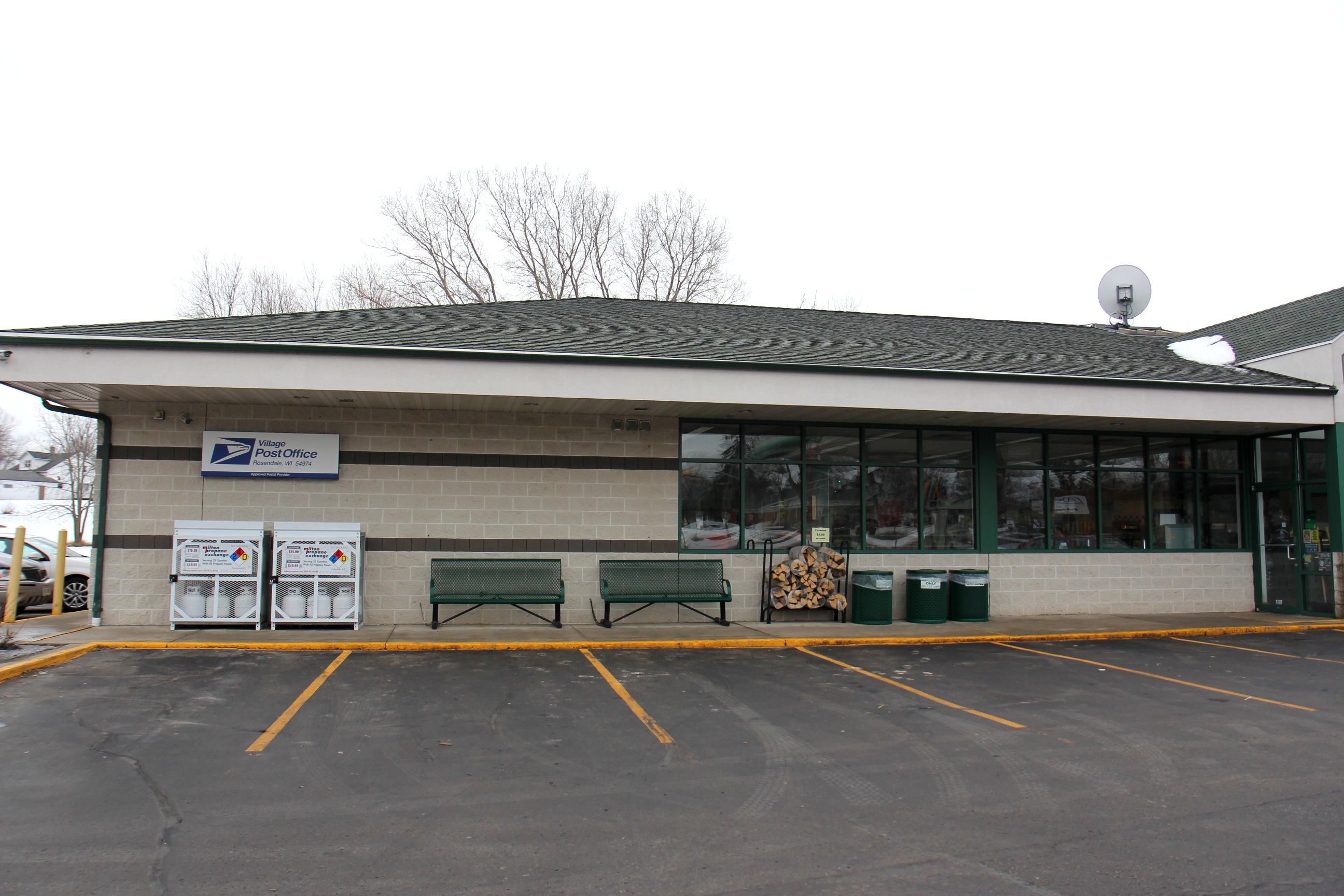
Post office

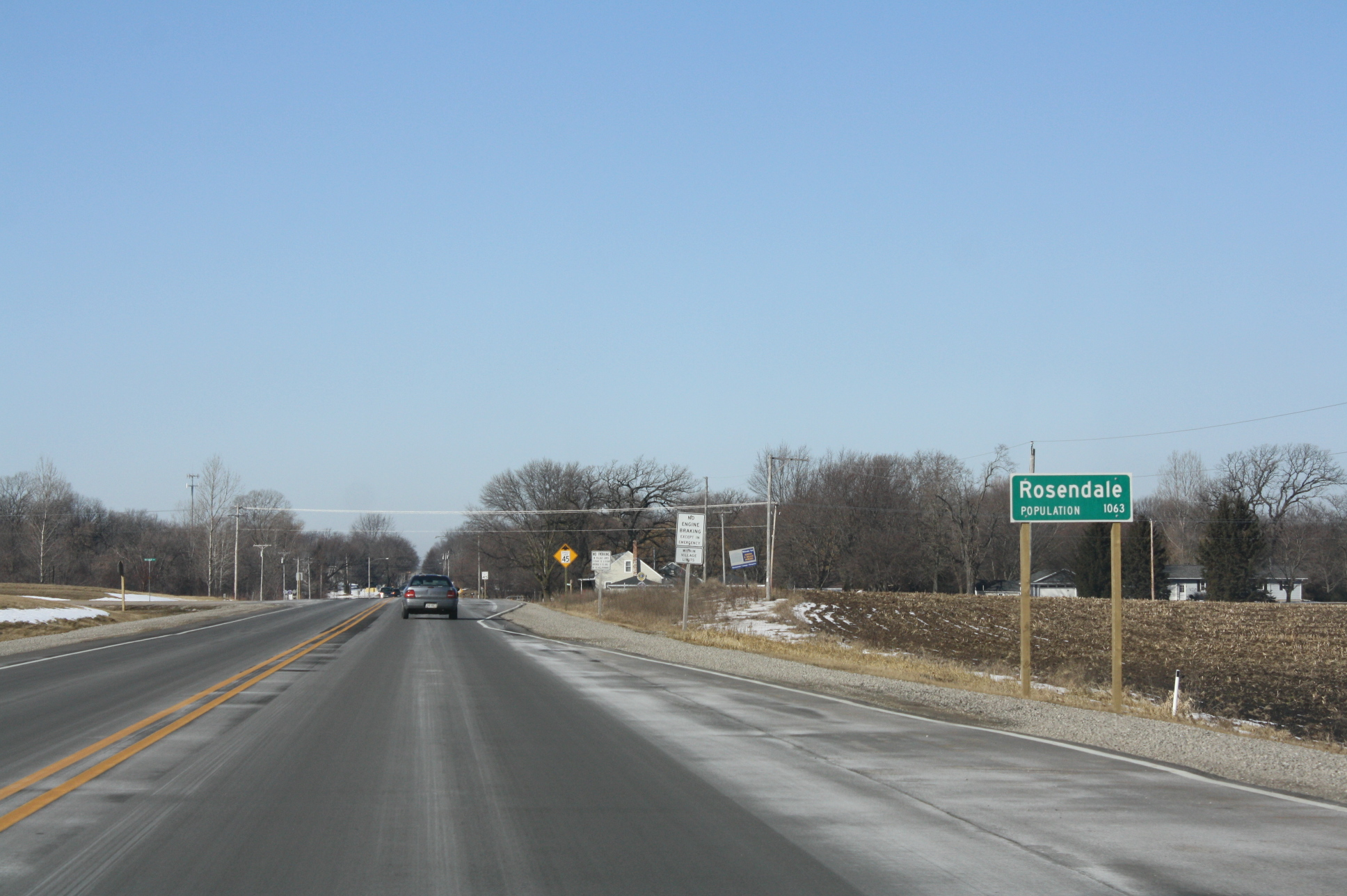
Looking west at the DOT Rosendale welcome sign

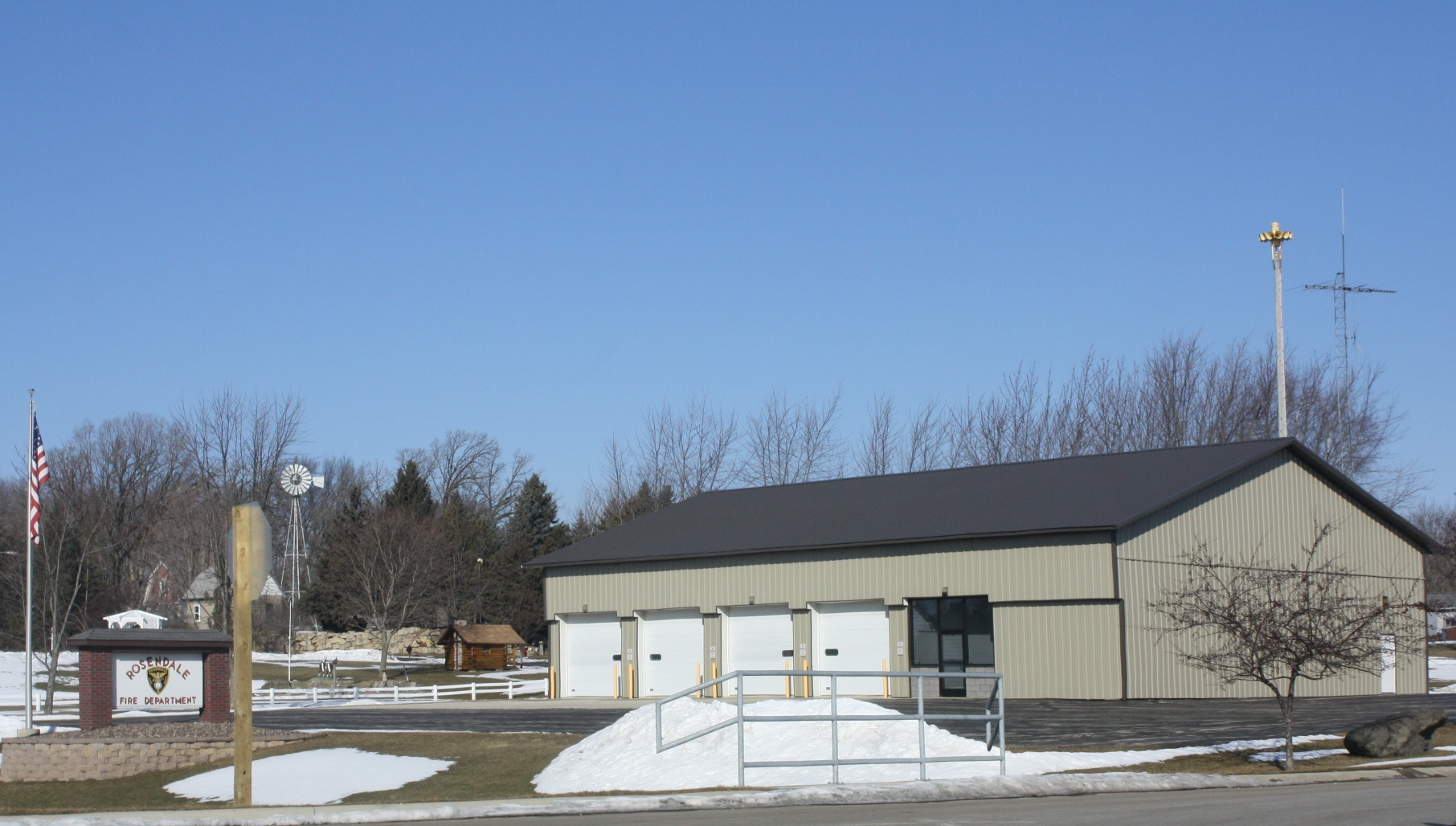
Fire Department

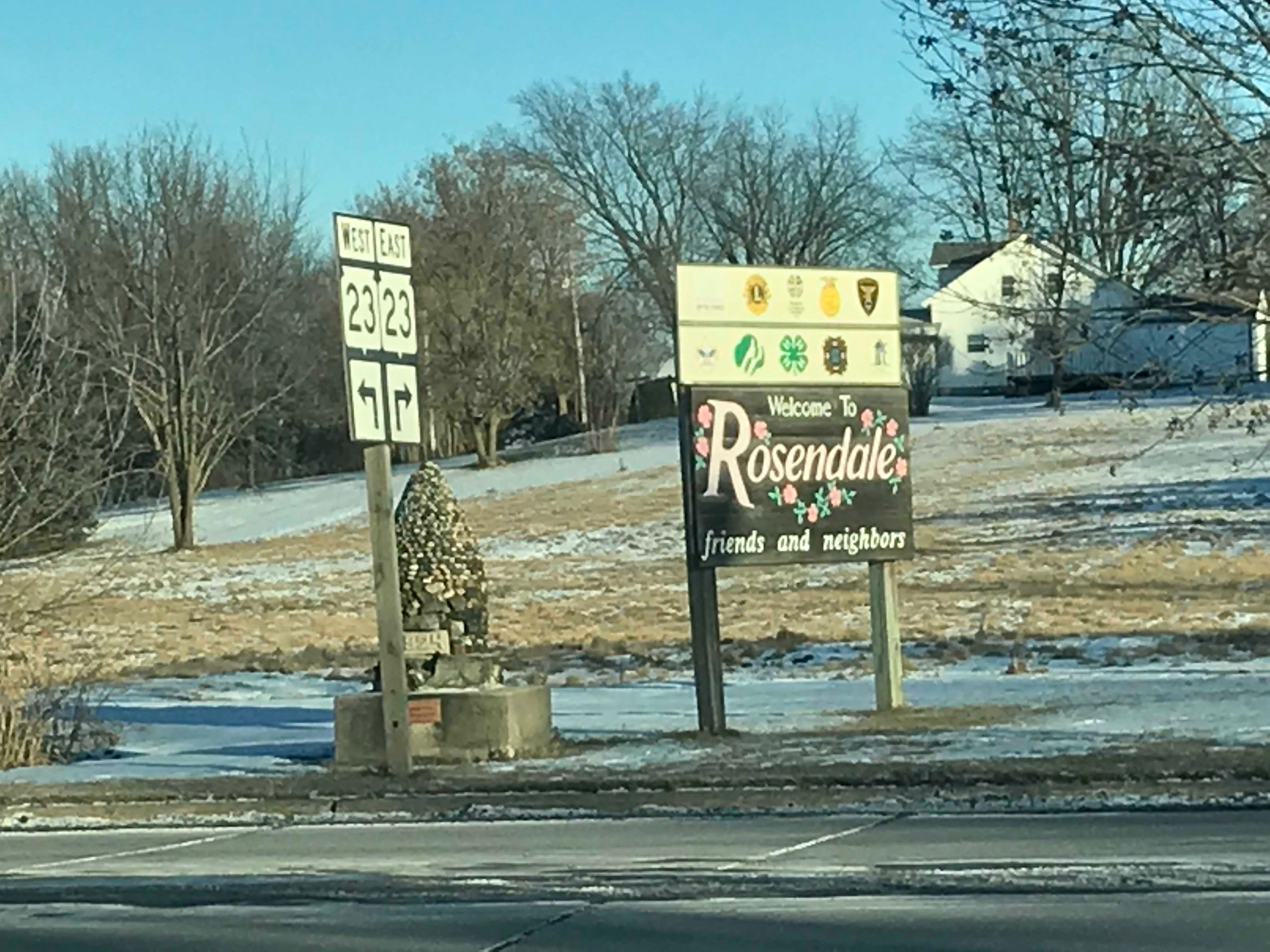
Welcome sign

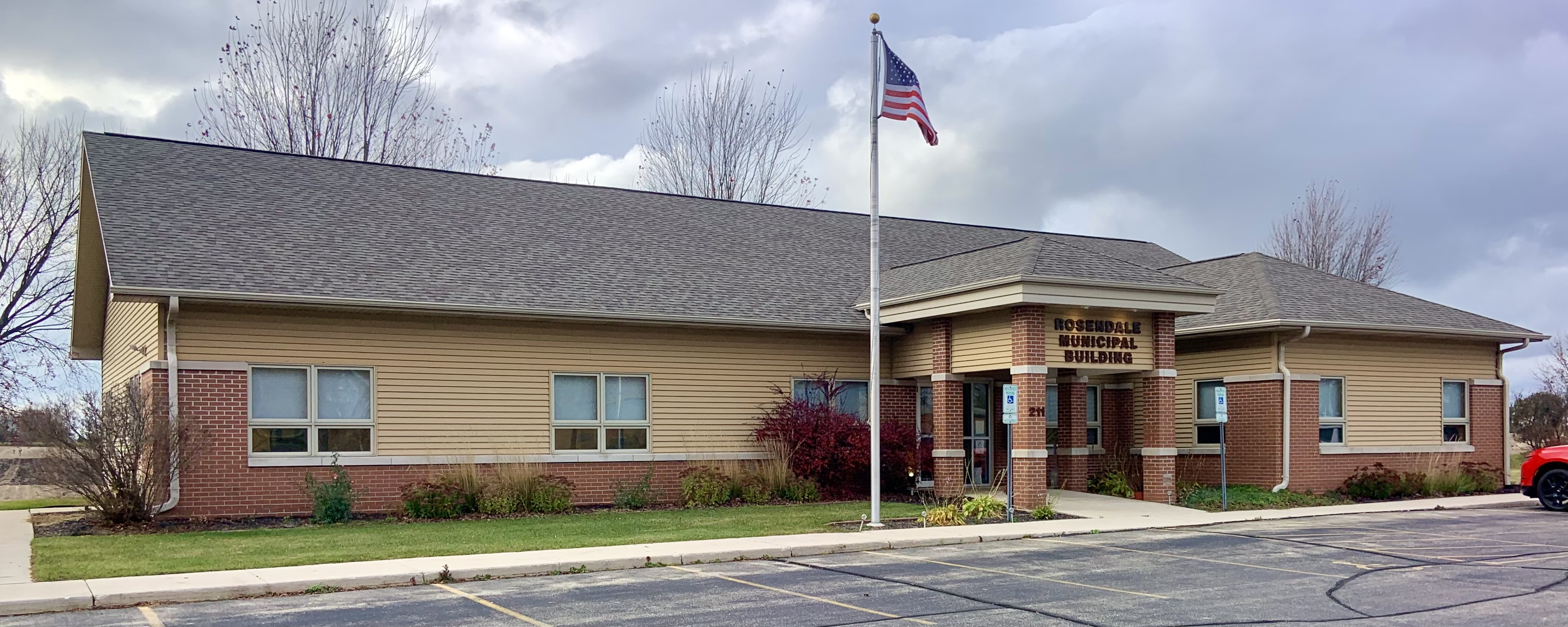
Village hall
