= David Jennings (state representative) =

American politician

David Jennings (1835–1906) was a member of the Wisconsin State Assembly during the 1891 and 1893 sessions. Other positions he held include Chairman (similar to Mayor) of Mukwa, Wisconsin. He was a Democrat. Jennings was born on November 15, 1835, in Syracuse, New York. He died on December 3, 1906, in New London, Wisconsin.
