= Nelson Fryer =

American politician

Nelson Fryer (February 22, 1818 – June 5, 1896) was an American farmer and politician.

Born in Princetown, Schenectady County, New York, Fryer moved to Cold Spring, Wisconsin Territory in 1843. Fryer was a farmer. He served on the Cold Spring Town Board and was chairman. He also served as town treasurer. In 1871, Fryer served in the Wisconsin State Assembly and was a Democrat.
