= Northport, Waupaca County, Wisconsin =

Census-designated place in Wisconsin, United States

Northport
- Census-designated place
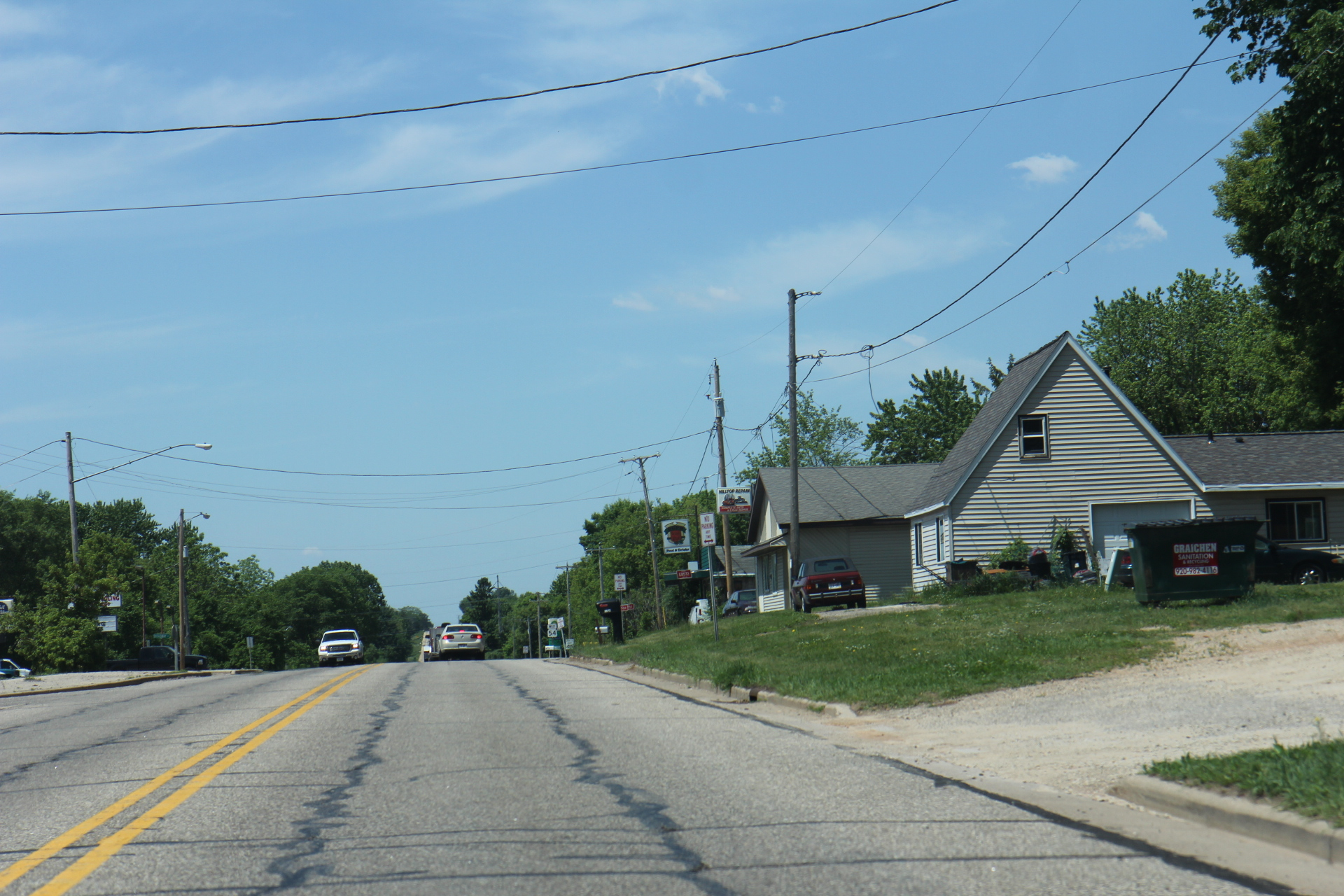
- Looking west in Northport on Wisconsin Highway 54

- Location within the state of Wisconsin
- Coordinates: 44°24′36″N 88°47′39″W
- Country: United States
- State: Wisconsin
- County: Waupaca

Area
  - Total: 1.763 sq mi (4.57 km^{2})
  - Land: 1.729 sq mi (4.48 km^{2})
  - Water: 0.034 sq mi (0.088 km^{2})

Population (2020)
  - Total: 459
  - Density: 265/sq mi (102/km^{2})
- Time zone: UTC-6 (Central (CST))
  - Summer (DST): UTC-5 (CDT)

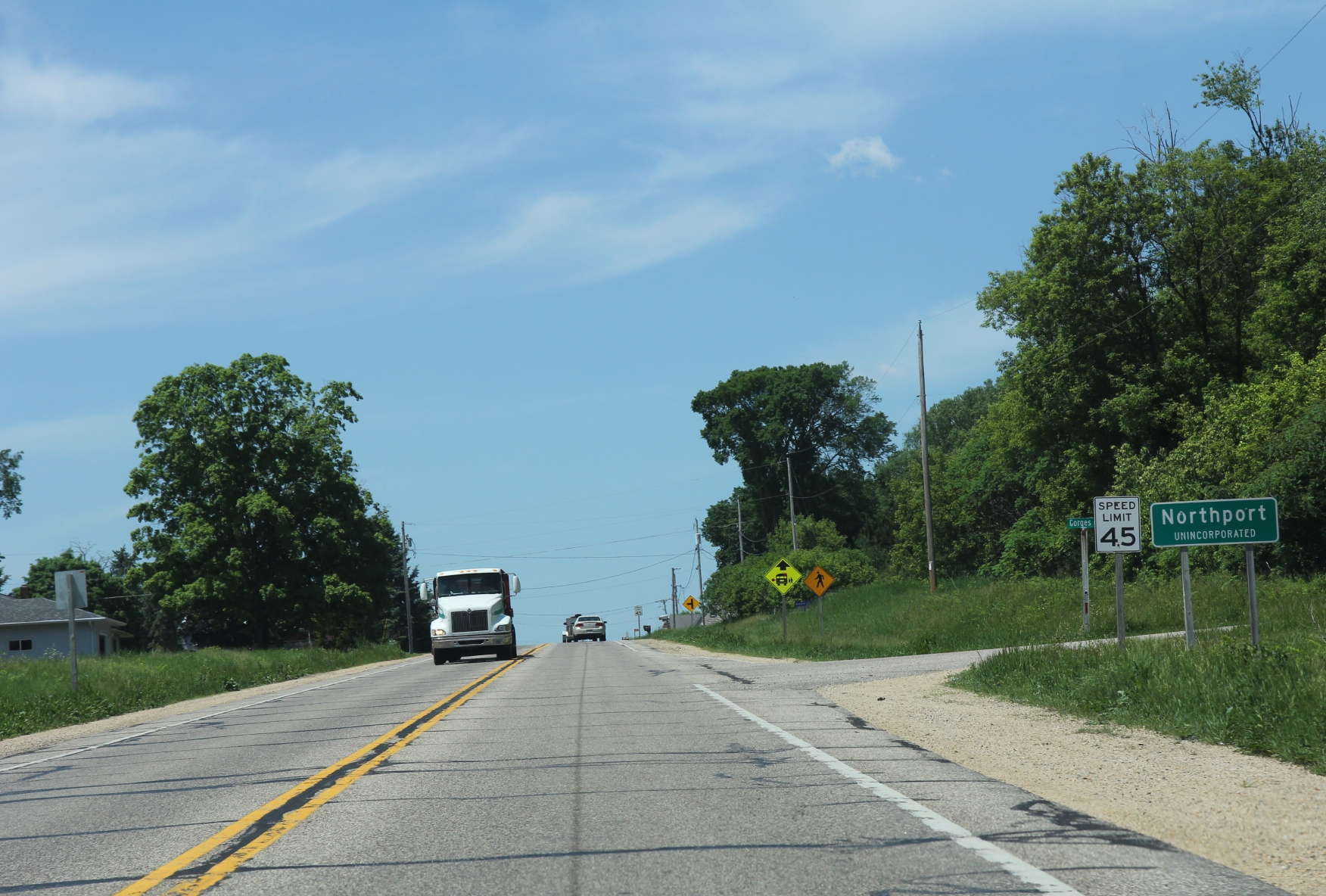
The sign for Northport

Northport is an unincorporated census-designated place located in the town of Mukwa, in Waupaca County, Wisconsin, United States. The community is on Wisconsin Highway 54, approximately two miles northwest of New London. As of the 2010 census, its population is 491.
