= William Chappell (Wisconsin politician) =

19th century American politician

Member of the Wisconsin Senate from the 14th district
- In office January 4, 1858 – January 2, 1860
- Preceded by: S. W. Barnes
- Succeeded by: Charles R. Gill

Member of the Wisconsin State Assembly
- In office January 5, 1857 – January 4, 1858
- Preceded by: David L. Morrison
- Succeeded by: Peter Rogan
- Constituency: Jefferson 3rd district
- In office January 7, 1856 – January 5, 1857
- Preceded by: Patrick Rogan
- Succeeded by: Delatus M. Aspinwall
- Constituency: Jefferson 1st district

3rd Mayor of Watertown, Wisconsin
- In office April 1856 – April 1857
- Preceded by: John W. Cole
- Succeeded by: Henry Bertram

Personal details
- Born: 1813 Norwich, Connecticut, U.S.
- Died: March 3, 1872 (aged 58–59) Watertown, Wisconsin, U.S.
- Cause of death: Tuberculosis
- Resting place: Mount Hope Cemetery, Rochester, New York
- Party: Democratic
- Occupation: Businessman, railroad promoter

Military service
- Allegiance: United States
- Branch/service: Wisconsin Militia

William Chappell (1813 – March 3, 1872) was an American businessman, railroad promoter, politician, and Wisconsin pioneer. He was the 3rd mayor of Watertown, Wisconsin, and represented Jefferson County for two years each in the Wisconsin Senate (1858 & 1859) and State Assembly (1856 & 1857). He was accused of being a leading participant in a railroad corruption scandal during his time in the Legislature, and was nearly expelled from the Senate.

== Biography ==
William Chappell was born in 1813 in Norwich, Connecticut. He moved to Rochester, New York, about 1830 and worked in milling and the freight forwarding businesses for about 15 years.

He moved to the Wisconsin Territory in 1845, and settled in the not-yet-incorporated village of Watertown. There he operated a merchant business, but soon became active in the developing railroad industry. He was a major promoter of the Watertown & Madison Railroad, and rose to prominence in Wisconsin politics, receiving an appointment as an assistant state adjutant general.

He was elected to two terms in the Wisconsin State Assembly, in 1855 and 1856, running on the Democratic Party ticket. In between those two legislative sessions, he was elected the third mayor of Watertown in the Spring of 1856. In the Fall of 1857, he was elected to the Wisconsin Senate, succeeding his one-time ally S. W. Barnes, who had also been a significant supporter of the Watertown & Madison Railroad.

The railroad failed that year, following the Panic of 1857, and the Legislature subsequently made extensive investigations into the railroad's bonds and land grants. Chappell was accused of having received bribes during the land grant process—when he was in the Assembly—and was accused of having bribed others for certain official actions, and later bribed potential witnesses against him to leave the state to avoid testimony. He was among the accused "Forty Thieves"—a popular shorthand for the legislators and officials accused of involvement in the railroad scandal—and he was personally named in a satirical song about the corruption saga.

A Senate committee investigation recommended that he should be expelled from the Senate in 1858, the Senate voted 18–9 favor of his expulsion on May 5, 1858, but failed to reach the necessary 20 vote threshold for expulsion. So Chappell went on to serve another year in the Senate, despite this highly public censure and a vote in his home city of Watertown to request his resignation.

Chappell left office in January 1860. Despite the public outrage, he remained in Watertown. He ultimately died in Watertown in 1872, after suffering from Tuberculosis.

Wisconsin State Assembly
| Preceded by Patrick Rogan | Member of the Wisconsin State Assembly from the Jefferson 1st district January 7, 1856 – January 5, 1857 | Succeeded by Delatus M. Aspinwall |
| Preceded by David L. Morrison | Member of the Wisconsin State Assembly from the Jefferson 3rd district January 5, 1857 – January 4, 1858 | Succeeded by Peter Rogan |
Wisconsin Senate
| Preceded by S. W. Barnes | Member of the Wisconsin Senate from the 14th district January 4, 1858 – January 2, 1860 | Succeeded by Charles R. Gill |
Political offices
| Preceded by John W. Cole | Mayor of Watertown, Wisconsin; April 1856 – April 1857 | Succeeded by Henry Bertram |
