= Warren, Waushara County, Wisconsin =

Warren, Wisconsin
- Town
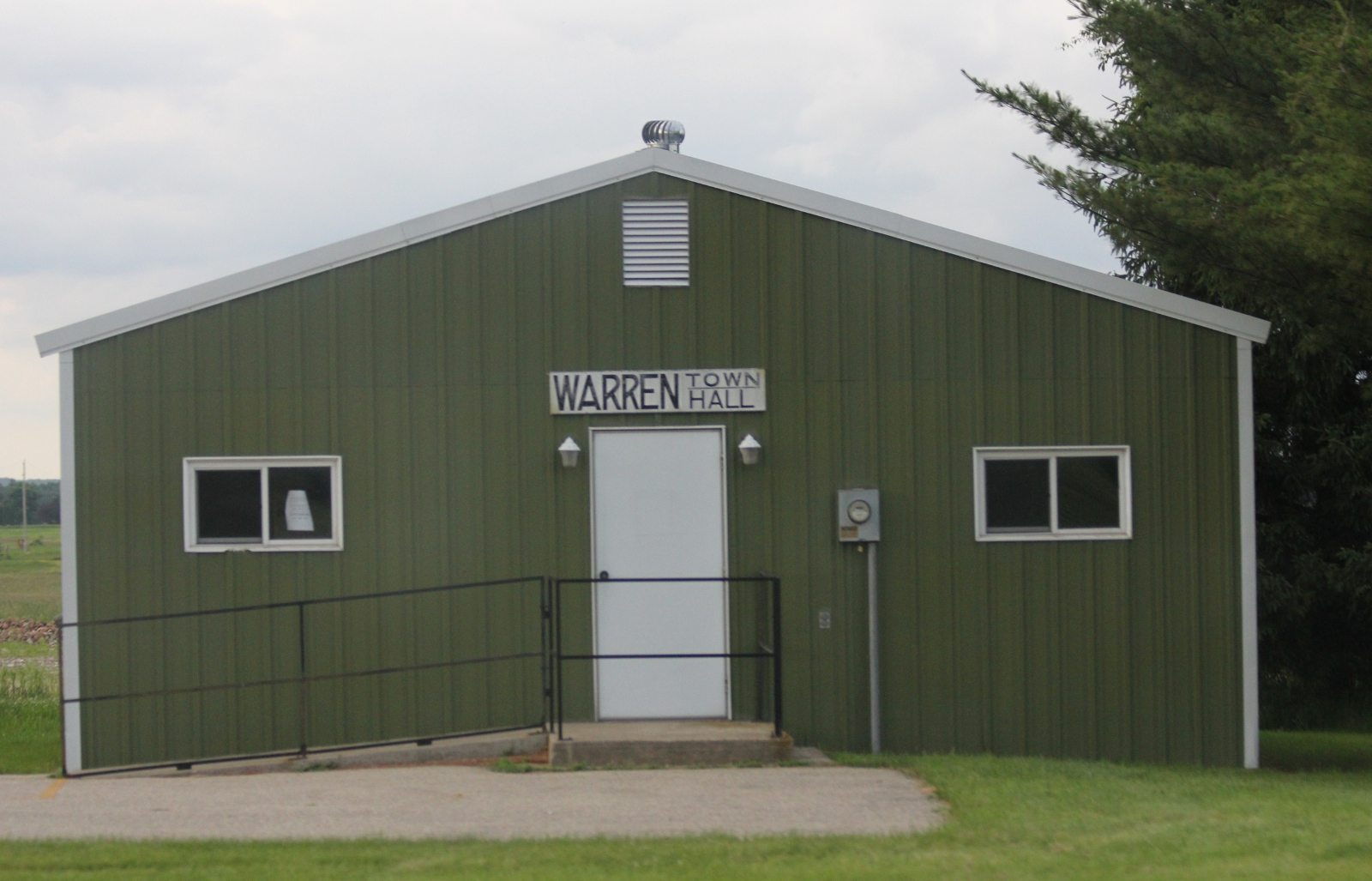
- Town hall

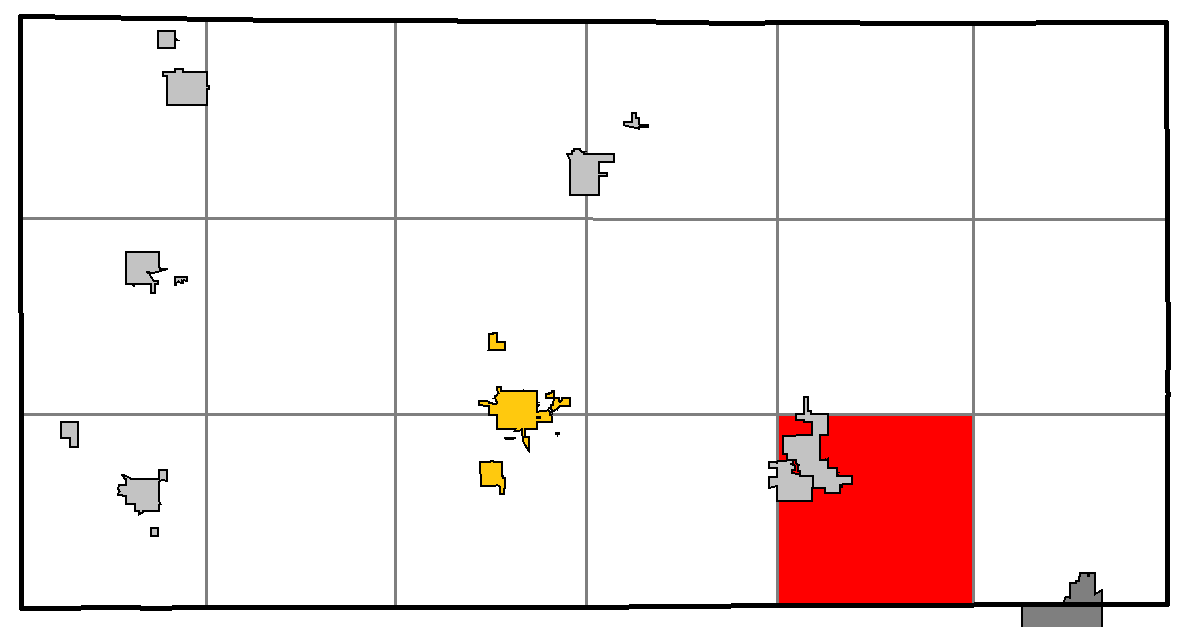
- Location of Warren, Waushara County, Wisconsin

- Location of Waushara County, Wisconsin
- Coordinates: 44°2′2″N 89°4′42″W
- Country: United States
- State: Wisconsin
- County: Waushara

Area
  - Total: 32.6 sq mi (84.5 km^{2})
  - Land: 32.5 sq mi (84.3 km^{2})
  - Water: 0.077 sq mi (0.2 km^{2})
- Elevation: 778 ft (237 m)

Population (2020)
  - Total: 656
  - Density: 20.2/sq mi (7.78/km^{2})
- Time zone: UTC-6 (Central (CST))
  - Summer (DST): UTC-5 (CDT)
- FIPS code: 55-83425
- GNIS feature ID: 1584346

Warren is a town in Waushara County, Wisconsin, United States. The population was 656 at the 2020 census. The ghost town of Rodney was located partially in the town.

== Geography ==
According to the United States Census Bureau, the town has a total area of 32.6 square miles (84.5 km^{2}), of which 32.5 square miles (84.3 km^{2}) is land and 0.1 square mile (0.2 km^{2}) (0.28%) is water.

== Demographics ==
As of the census of 2000, there were 675 people, 261 households, and 192 families residing in the town. The population density was 20.7 people per square mile (8.0/km^{2}). There were 334 housing units at an average density of 10.3 per square mile (4.0/km^{2}). The racial makeup of the town was 98.37% White, 0.15% Native American, 0.15% Asian, 0.74% from other races, and 0.59% from two or more races. Hispanic or Latino of any race were 2.22% of the population.

There were 261 households, out of which 29.5% had children under the age of 18 living with them, 65.1% were married couples living together, 4.2% had a female householder with no husband present, and 26.1% were non-families. 20.3% of all households were made up of individuals, and 10.3% had someone living alone who was 65 years of age or older. The average household size was 2.59 and the average family size was 2.95.

In the town, the population was spread out, with 24.4% under the age of 18, 6.7% from 18 to 24, 26.1% from 25 to 44, 26.7% from 45 to 64, and 16.1% who were 65 years of age or older. The median age was 40 years. For every 100 females, there were 98.5 males. For every 100 females age 18 and over, there were 105.6 males.

The median income for a household in the town was $38,438, and the median income for a family was $43,833. Males had a median income of $28,750 versus $20,000 for females. The per capita income for the town was $15,672. About 3.2% of families and 7.6% of the population were below the poverty line, including 4.6% of those under age 18 and 14.6% of those age 65 or over.
