= Jonathan Taylor (Wisconsin politician) =

American politician

Jonathan Taylor was an American pioneer and politician. He was a member of the Wisconsin State Assembly.

Taylor began his life in Wabash, Indiana, before moving to the Wisconsin Territory. In 1838, Taylor worked as an agent for a two-horse stage line operating between Mineral Point, Madison and Fort Winnebago, run by Colonel Abner Nichols. While working there, Taylor laid one of the first claims in Sauk County, Wisconsin near present-day Sauk City, along with Berry Haney and Solomon Shore.

After Nichols died, Taylor purchased a two horse team and hauled goods between Chicago, Milwaukee, and Madison. During the winter months, Taylor hauled sleds of trout from Green Bay to Galena, Illinois and returned with supplies needed in Fort Winnebago, Fond du Lac and Green Bay.

He worked for a time as a contractor in Milwaukee, where he was elected to the Wisconsin State Assembly in 1857. He then moved to New York City with Charles Trainor, where he made a fortune laying block pavement.
