= Benjamin F. Phillips =

American politician

Benjamin F. Phillips was an American politician.

From Mukwa, Wisconsin, Phillips was a Democrat. In 1857, Phillips served in the Wisconsin State Assembly. He served as District Attorney for Waupaca County, Wisconsin in 1853 and on the Waupaca County Board of Supervisors in 1856. Philips also surveyed and platted the town of Mukwa.
