= John F. Potter =

19th-century American politician

John Fox Potter
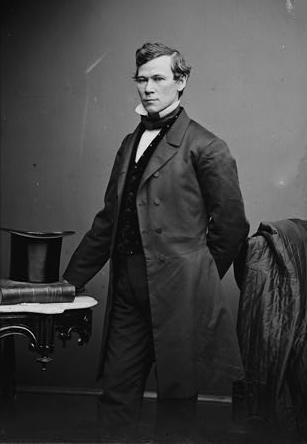

Chairman of the House Committee on Public Lands
- In office March 4, 1861 – March 3, 1863
- Preceded by: Eli Thayer
- Succeeded by: George W. Julian

Member of the U.S. House of Representatives from Wisconsin's 1st district
- In office March 4, 1857 – March 3, 1863
- Preceded by: Daniel Wells Jr.
- Succeeded by: James S. Brown

Member of the Wisconsin State Assembly from the Walworth 3rd district
- In office January 7, 1856 – January 5, 1857
- Preceded by: Samuel Pratt
- Succeeded by: Solmous Wakeley

Personal details
- Born: May 11, 1817 Augusta, Massachusetts, U.S. (now Maine)
- Died: May 18, 1899 (aged 82) East Troy, Wisconsin, U.S.
- Party: Republican; Whig (before 1854)
- Spouses: Frances Elizabeth Lewis Fox (m. 1839; died 1863); Sarah Lewis Fox (m. 1865–1882)
- Children: Rebecca Lewis Potter^{(b. 1841; died 1908)}; Alfred Charles Potter^{(b. 1843; died 1915)}; Caroline Fox Potter^{(b. 1845; died 1850)}; Frances Elizabeth Fox Potter^{(b. 1847; died 1918)}; John Kendall Potter^{(b. 1853; died 1864)}; Julia Kendall Potter^{(b. 1857; died 1858)}
- Parent: John Potter (father)
- Relatives: Barrett Potter (uncle)
- Profession: Politician, Lawyer, Judge
- Nickname: "Bowie Knife" Potter

John Fox "Bowie Knife" Potter (May 11, 1817 – May 18, 1899) was an American lawyer, Radical Republican politician, and Wisconsin pioneer. He served three terms in the U.S. House of Representatives, representing Wisconsin's 1st congressional district from 1857 to 1863. During the 37th U.S. Congress, he served as chair of the House Committee on Public Lands and helped shepherd the passage of the Homestead Act of 1862. In that same term, he was also chair of the House Select Committee on Loyalty of Federal Employees, which attempted to root out Confederate sympathizers from government; his activities in that role led to significant acrimony with Secretary of War Simon Cameron.

Potter earned his nickname ("Bowie Knife" Potter) because he demanded to use the bowie knife as his weapon when he was challenged to a duel in 1860 by Virginia U.S. representative Roger A. Pryor; the duel never ultimately took place, but the affair was widely covered by political newspapers around the country, turning Potter into an abolitionist celebrity for standing up to southern threats. Subsequently, at the 1860 Republican National Convention, Potter was presented with a giant six-foot-long folding knife to commemorate the event; Potter's monster knife is now in the collections of the Wisconsin Historical Society.

Earlier in his career, he served one term in the Wisconsin State Assembly during the 1856 term. As a legislator, he led the investigation into corruption in the administration of Democratic governor William A. Barstow, and—in the same term—played a pivotal role in facilitating the massive La Crosse and Milwaukee Railroad bribery scandal which tainted dozens of Wisconsin legislators and Republican governor Coles Bashford. He also served several years as probate judge of Walworth County, and served as American consul general at Montreal after leaving Congress (1864–1866).

Potter was one of the first settlers in the town of East Troy, Wisconsin, and one of the first lawyers admitted to practice law in the Wisconsin Territory; he is the namesake of Potter Lake, Wisconsin.

John Fox Potter's father, John Potter, and uncle, Barrett Potter, were both prominent lawyers and elected officials in Maine.

== Early life ==
John Fox Potter was born in Augusta, Massachusetts (now Augusta, Maine), in May 1817. He received his collegiate education at Phillips Exeter Academy in New Hampshire, then studied law in his father's law office. At age 19, he ventured out to see the new western territories of the United States. He first visited Chicago in 1836, then explored the Michigan Territory—where his uncle had settled—and the Wisconsin Territory in 1837. After returning to Maine, Potter concluded to settle in Wisconsin.

He returned to Wisconsin in the spring of 1838, and claimed a plot of land on the north shore of the lake that would soon after be named for him (Potter Lake). He was one of the first settlers in what is now the town of East Troy, in Walworth County. He built a log cabin there—later replaced by a larger house; this homestead remained his primary residence for the rest of his life.

== Pioneer life in Wisconsin ==
Potter was admitted to practice law in the Wisconsin Territory in 1839 and became the first lawyer working in what is now the town of East Troy; he was the only lawyer in that area until 1843. In 1839, Potter was also appointed the first postmaster at East Troy, serving in that role for two years. During those early years, he also became active in the nascent temperance movement in Wisconsin.

In 1841, Potter was selected by the Council of the Wisconsin Territory (upper legislative chamber) to serve as a transcribing clerk for the second session of the 3rd Wisconsin Territorial Assembly. The following spring, he was appointed probate judge for Walworth County by Governor Henry Dodge; he ultimately served in that role until 1847. Also in 1842, the town of Troy—which then also included the territory of the present town of East Troy—held its first formal town meeting, and Potter was one of 70 landowning men in attendance and eligible to vote.

== Early political career ==
During his early years in Wisconsin, Potter was active in the Whig Party, and he served as a delegate to the 1852 Whig National Convention. In 1854, outrage among anti-slavery partisans led to the establishment of the Republican Party, absorbing much of the old Whig organization. Potter was an active participant in the 1854 caucuses and conventions of the new Republican Party of Wisconsin. He also became involved in the excited abolishionist activism in Wisconsin surrounding the controversial Ableman v. Booth case, and circulated a fiery petition calling for the resignation of Wisconsin U.S. district court judge Andrew G. Miller.

In the fall of 1855, Potter was elected to the state central committee of the Republican Party of Wisconsin, and a few months later he was elected to represent northeast Walworth County in the Wisconsin State Assembly for the 9th Wisconsin Legislature. Wisconsin was roiled by corruption scandals in the mid-1850s, and in the 1856 legislative term, Potter was appointed to head a special investigative committee to audit several state offices and school land sales taking place under the previous governor, William A. Barstow. The investigation continued through the summer of 1856, and ultimately reported significant fraud and self-dealing, suggesting that the total loss for the state university fund amounted to more than $3 million (about $114 million adjusted for inflation). During that same term, however, Potter also played a critical role in one of the biggest scandals in Wisconsin's history—he wrote the final version of the bill which authorized state land grants to the La Crosse and Milwaukee Railroad. It would be revealed roughly a year later that railroad boss Byron Kilbourn bought the passage of this bill by bribing dozens of legislators and state officials, including the governor. Despite his central role in the passage of the legislation, the investigation later showed that Potter was one of only five legislators to vote for the bill who did not accept a bribe.

After the end of the regular legislative session, in March 1856, Potter had also been elected to another term as probate judge in Walworth County. In June, he attended the Republican state convention and was also elected to serve as a delegate to the 1856 Republican National Convention in Philadelphia. At the national convention in June, Potter was named as Wisconsin's representative on the national platform and resolutions committee.

== Years in congress (1856–1863) ==
Wisconsin's 1st congressional district 1849–1861

Also happening in the summer of 1856, the influential Milwaukee Republican newspaper the Daily Free Democrat began pushing for Potter's nomination for U.S. House of Representatives in Wisconsin's 1st congressional district. Going into the Republican nominating convention, Potter's chief rivals for the nomination were abolitionist leader Edward D. Holton and Racine district attorney William P. Lyon. At the convention in Racine, however, Potter was easily nominated on the first ballot.

In the 1856 general election, Potter faced Jackson Hadley, a Democratic Party stalwart—he was the incumbent Milwaukee city council president and a state senator representing the north half of Milwaukee County. In the 1850s, Wisconsin's 1st congressional district comprised Kenosha, Milwaukee, Racine, Walworth, and Waukesha counties. Milwaukee's large Democratic majority generally kept the district in the control of the Democratic Party, but significant divisions had emerged in the Democratic Party of Wisconsin, exacerbated by the corruption charges in the Barstow administration; Hadley was seen as a close ally of Barstow, and faced significant opposition from the anti-Barstow faction. But Potter's campaign was not without its own problems, as he was quoted making radical statements in support of secession as a tool to abolish slavery. Potter narrowly prevailed in the general election, taking 50.6% of the vote, as Democratic presidential candidate James Buchanan narrowly carried the district in presidential popular vote.

Shortly after the election, Governor Coles Bashford named Potter as one of three commissioners to revise and update the statutes to reflect the recent session's legislation, but Potter declined the appointment due to his other responsibilities.

Potter ran for re-election in 1858, and had the quick support of most of the Republican newspapers of his district; he was unanimously renominated at the Republican convention in September. His opponent in the 1858 general election was the prominent Democratic newspaper publisher Beriah Brown, who had only recently relocated to the 1st congressional district; his nomination was somewhat accidental, occurring after a long and contentious nominating convention. The division in the Wisconsin Democratic Party continued in 1858, and was exacerbated further by northern Democratic anger with the presidential administration of Democrat James Buchanan. Brown identified as an anti-Barstow and anti-Buchanan Democrat, but he was also one of the largest recipients of the La Crosse and Milwaukee Railroad bribes, having received $52,000 worth of railroad bonds (about $2 million adjusted for inflation). The 1858 election was a Republican wave, and Potter had the best election of his career, receiving 56% of the vote and winning his second term.

=== Kansas ===
Early in the 35th Congress, amidst the ongoing civil unrest in the Kansas Territory, Potter made a tour of the territory to highlight the complaints of anti-slavery residents who claimed they were being disenfranchised in elections; he also accused the territory governor, Robert J. Walker, of acquiescing to the disenfranchisement scheme. The Kansas issue remained a major disagreement in Congress, animating much of the belligerence seen during this term. Potter—like many abolitionist politicians—pledged to never vote for the admission of another slave state to the Union.

=== Brawl on the House floor (1858) ===
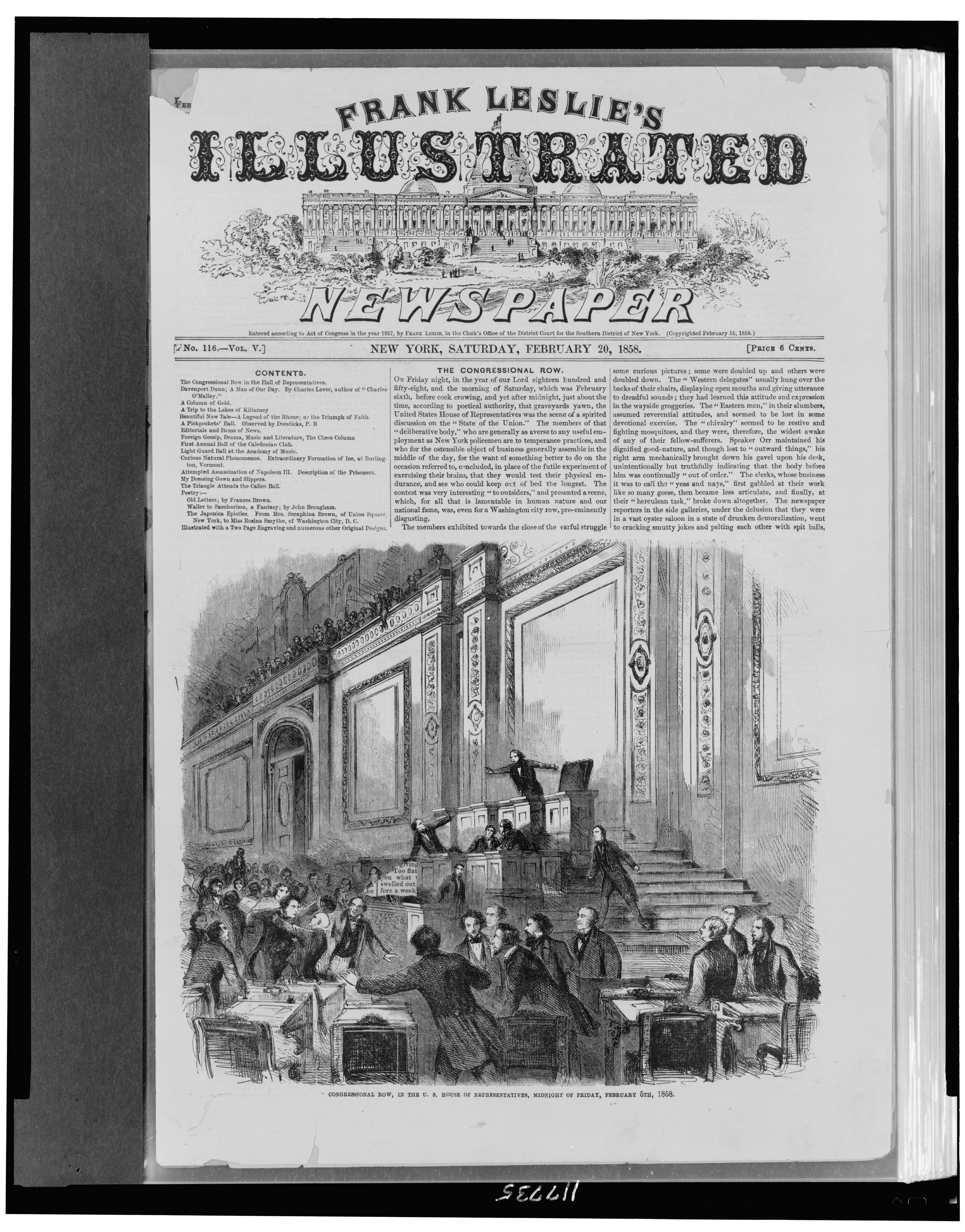
Illustration of the brawl in the House chamber

This era, in the run-up to the American Civil War, was also notorious for physical violence in Washington between pro-slavery and anti-slavery members of Congress, and Potter was involved in a major altercation in the House chamber during his first term, on February 5, 1858. The fight began over a passing statement between Galusha A. Grow, a Republican, and Laurence M. Keitt, a Democrat, with Keitt attacking and attempting to choke Grow. In the scuffle, Grow's head smacked into the face of Reuben Davis of Mississippi, which provoked his colleague William Barksdale to try to step in. Seeing the disturbance, several dozen Republicans jumped into the fray; the event occurred less than two years after the caning of Charles Sumner and several of the Republicans believed this was an orchestrated attack on one of their members.

Potter was described as "leap[ing] into the midst of the fight by the side of Grow" and "striking at everyone whom he supposed implicated in the assault." William Barksdale—not seeing who hit him—retaliated against Elihu B. Washburne of Illinois, which provoked his brother, Cadwallader C. Washburn of Wisconsin. Lucius Q. C. Lamar, of Mississippi, stepped in to support Barksdale, and Potter then rejoined the fight on behalf of his colleague from Wisconsin. In the confusion, Potter grabbed at Barksdale's hair and tore off his wig. Finally, peacemakers managed to separate the belligerent factions, and, after a cooling-down, they all expressed regret over the apparent misunderstanding. Partisans in Wisconsin, however, celebrated Potter and Washburn for their roles in the melee. Barksdale and Potter were reconciled as colleagues, but Barksdale ultimately volunteered for the Confederate Army and was killed at the Battle of Gettysburg.

=== Slave ownership controversy (1860) ===
In early 1860, Potter's 1858 campaign opponent, Beriah Brown, along with newly elected Wisconsin Democratic U.S. representative Charles H. Larrabee, began spreading a story that Potter had taken ownership of slaves while residing in Washington, which would obviously significantly contrast with his public anti-slavery positions. The true story turned out to be more complicated. Two black men in transit to Philadelphia were stuck in Washington after being refused passage without the ability to pay an insurance bond to protect the railroad in the event that a white man were to later claim them as property and sue the railroad for assisting their passage. Stuck and needing to raise funds for their transportation, they took a job in the Avenue House, where Potter resided while working in Washington.

Later the two men were arrested and charged with failing to register in Washington as "free negroes", they were charged a fine of $12 for the first day, and $5 for each subsequent day, releasing them to make payment. The next morning, an officer arrived at the Avenue House to arrest the two men for nonpayment. Potter—who was having breakfast—interrupted the officer, demanding he produce papers justifying the arrest. Unable to supply valid paperwork, Potter insisted the officer leave. After his breakfast, Potter went to the justice's office to investigate the claims. The justice also could not produce any papers justifying the fine or arrest. Potter, along with fellow U.S. representative John Covode, then went to see the mayor of Washington, James G. Berret, to resolve the issue. The mayor suggested that if Potter and Covode would sign a certificate claiming the two men as their servants, that would relieve them from any further punishment. Potter and Covode signed the necessary paperwork then accompanied the men to Philadelphia to ensure they completed their journey.

Later, Potter sued Brown for libel.

=== Duel controversy (1860) ===
In April 1860, Potter was involved in another physical confrontation on the floor of the House Chamber in the United States Capitol. Tensions were high again in Washington after a difficult election for the speaker of the House, which lasted from December 5, 1859, until February 1, 1860. On April 5, 1860, the House was set to debate a tariff bill, and U.S. representative Owen Lovejoy, a Republican of Illinois, was recognized to speak. Lovejoy's speech ignored the tariff, and instead became a long and emotional denunciation of slavery and the justifications for maintaining it, and tipped into attacking the character of those opposing abolition. His speech created an uproar from the Democratic side of the chamber, and he was approached by Representative Roger A. Pryor of Virginia, who shouted and gestured at the speaker. Potter leapt up and confronted Pryor, insisting that Lovejoy be allowed to continue his speech. Members of both parties converged on the confrontation, and the chamber descended into chaos and confusion.

After a few minutes, the speaker managed to restore order to the House, and Lovejoy went to resume his remarks. Lovejoy's brother, Elijah Lovejoy, had been a prominent abolitionist and was assassinated by a pro-slavery mob in 1837. In the latter portion of his speech, Lovejoy invoked the memory of his dead brother in a fiery conclusion.

A few days later, Pryor and Potter resumed their conflict when Pryor took issue with the official printed record of the controversy of April 5. Pryor had attempted to remove Potter's words from the official record, but Potter had heard of the attempt and replaced them. Pryor was incensed when he read the words in the record, and demanded Potter answer for the statements, asking whether Potter had intended to menace or insult his character. Potter said he stood by the words in the record, which prompted Pryor to declare that he would challenge Potter to a duel.

Over the next several days, Pryor and Potter exchanged written correspondence, directly and through intermediaries, in which Pryor attempted to establish a time, place, and circumstance for a potential duel. As Pryor was the initiator of the challenge, Potter had the right to name the weapons to conduct the duel; through his friend, Frederick W. Lander, Potter conveyed that he wished to fight Pryor using a bowie knife. Pryor's friend, T. P. Chisman, reacted with outrage, saying that such a duel would be barbarous and uncivilized. Potter, through Lander, responded that he found the entire affair barbarous and uncivilized, so thought the weapon appropriate. Potter's letters can be read as mocking what he saw as a southern masquerade of "chivalry", and most likely never intended to follow through with the duel. With Pryor and Potter unable to agree on terms, the duel never took place. For the remainder of the term, Potter was often accompanied by armed friends when out and about in Washington, D.C.

In this time immediately preceding the Civil War, violence and the threat of violence were a very real concern for American politicians. Threats of duels were a tactic often used by southern pro-slavery politicians to attempt to intimidate and silence abolitionist speech; duels were extremely uncommon in the north, and were in fact outlawed in many northern states. Potter's stand against Pryor was celebrated by northern newspapers around the country as vindicating the rights of abolitionists to speak freely on the House floor; the newspapers gave him the nickname "Bowie Knife" Potter. Abolitionist Wendell Phillips later described the incident, saying that if the caning of Charles Sumner was the first battle of the war, then Potter's stand against Pryor was the first "victory" for the abolitionist side. A month after the duel controversy, Potter was a delegate to the 1860 Republican National Convention in Chicago and was presented with a giant six-foot long folding knife from the Missouri delegation.

The menacing political atmosphere of the late 1850s also led to the rise of abolitionist militias and paramilitary organizations in the northern states, and Potter became an early icon for their cause; he was loudly celebrated at the national convention of the Wide Awakes. The Milwaukee chapter of the Wide Awakes—which owned at least one actual cannon—named their cannon "John F. Potter".

=== 1860 re-election and secession crisis ===
After his duel celebrity, Republican leaders in Potter's congressional district decided that he should be renominated for 1860 without the formality of a convention, and instead held a mass public meeting in Milwaukee to acclaim him as their nominee.

His opponent in the 1860 general election was Jonathan Earle Arnold, a pro-Union Democrat and former Whig, and a prominent lawyer in the state. Arnold identified as a Douglas Democrat, and disavowed the unpopular incumbent Democratic president, Buchanan. Democrats in the district mocked the duel controversy and Potter's celebrity from those events. In the end, however, the political mood in Wisconsin carried Republicans to a pivotal victory in the 1860 election; Potter won his district with 54% of the vote.

The results of the 1860 election also initiated the secession crisis, with southern slave-owning states moving to quit the United States. In the months after the election, Potter returned to Madison to brief the Wisconsin Legislature on the crisis in Washington. During that time, he also campaigned heavily on behalf of his colleague Cadwallader C. Washburn who was pursuing the 1861 U.S. Senate election in the Legislature. Washburn, at the time, was detained in Washington, working as part of the controversial "House Committee of 33" working to find a compromise to prevent secession.

Upon his return to Washington, in February 1861, Potter was one of 131 participants at the Peace Conference of 1861, at the Willard Hotel. The conference ultimately failed to defuse the secession crisis, and the American Civil War would begin two months later.

Potter volunteered with Cassius Marcellus Clay's battalion for the defense of Washington in the immediate aftermath of the Battle of Fort Sumter. He later sought to enlist with a Wisconsin volunteer regiment. Ultimately Potter chose to remain in Congress rather than going to the battlefield.

=== 37th Congress (1861–1863) ===
In the 37th Congress, Potter was appointed chair of the House Committee on Public Lands. This was an extremely important committee in the era, particularly for northern constituencies keen to obtain parcels from the vast tracts of land held by the federal government. From his role on this committee, he was author of one of the most significant pieces of economic legislation of the era, the Homestead Act of 1862; this law expanded the Preemption Act of 1841—attempting to make the project more affordable for settlers.

==== Committee on loyalty of federal employees (1862) ====
Before the start of the Civil War, Potter's speeches on the secession crisis focused some ire at a set of clerks and employees of the federal government who he accused of inciting and encouraging secession. Shortly after the start of the Civil War, Potter shepherded a resolution through the House calling for a committee to investigate such secessionist sympathizers in government. Potter was immediately appointed chair of the committee, known as the Select Committee on Loyalty of Government Employees. Within months, Potter published an initial list of 220 known or suspected secessionist sympathizers, sent the lists to the employing agencies, and demanded firings or further investigation. He also made the alarming accusation that sympathizers working at the Washington arsenal had sabotaged cannon shells, causing them to fail to detonate when fired during the first battle of Bull Run.

Potter's efforts were not appreciated by all department-heads in Lincoln's government. Among his list of suspects, Potter identified roughly 50 men working for the Department of War. Secretary of War Simon Cameron found the request annoying and intrusive, and opted to ignore repeated demands from Potter's committee. The tumultuous relationship between Potter and the War Department was ultimately alleviated when Cameron was replaced by Edwin Stanton on January 20, 1862. Stanton met with Potter on his first day as war secretary, and on the same day, dismissed four persons whom Potter deemed unsavory. This was well short of the full list that Potter had identified, but he was nonetheless pleased with Stanton's initiative.

=== 1862 election ===
At the 1862 Republican district convention in Wisconsin's 1st congressional district, Potter was unanimously re-nominated on the first ballot. His Democratic opponent in the general election was James S. Brown, who had served as the 1st attorney general of Wisconsin; more recently Brown had served as mayor of Milwaukee, leaving office in April 1862, he had earned wide acclaim for his handling of a major city debt crisis. Brown was a strong challenger, and the political environment was much worse for Potter in 1862, Republican constituencies were frustrated by slow progress in the war, Democratic constituencies were emboldened by outrage over conscription policies and northern white angst over the Emancipation Proclamation. Potter also hemorrhaged support from some of his usual constituencies due to his support for controversial candidates for federal appointments in Wisconsin. Potentially as a bid to assist his campaign, Potter's elder son, Alfred C. Potter, enlisted for duty with the 28th Wisconsin Infantry Regiment in August 1862.

The political climate ultimately enabled the Democrats to flip 30 seats in the House of Representatives, Potter lost his election to Brown, receiving just 44% of the vote.

== Later years ==
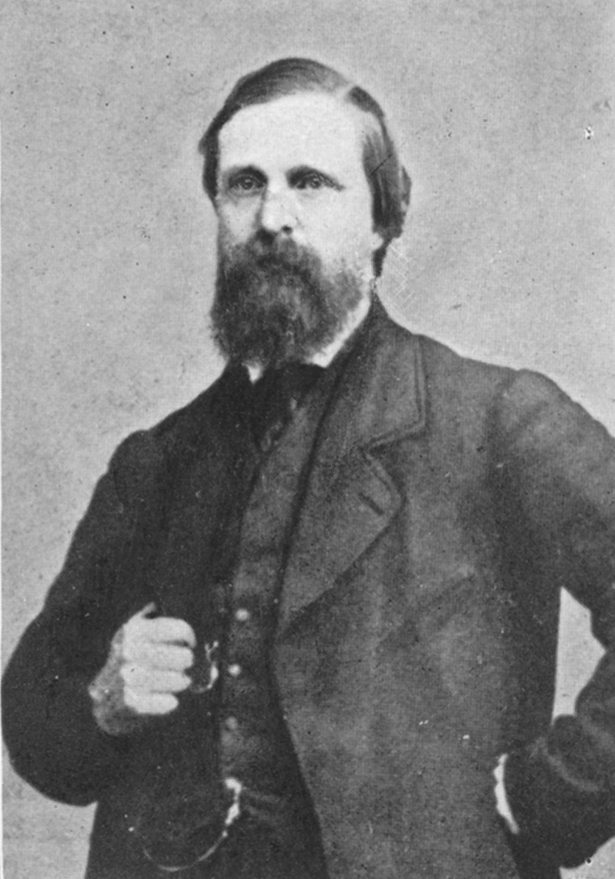
Photo of Potter from later in life.

After Potter's congressional term ended in early 1863, his name was entered into nomination as a candidate for the 1863 United States Senate election in Wisconsin, and received a respectable number of votes in the Republican caucus, but he was ultimately not nominated. The Lincoln administration offered Potter a number of different domestic or overseas federal appointments, he was then nominated and confirmed by the Senate as governor of the Dakota Territory.

Before he could start his new job, however, Potter suffered serious personal tragedy; his wife had become heavily involved with the work of relief organizations in Washington, caring for the Union Army's sick and wounded soldiers. She contracted Typhoid fever while tending to sick soldiers, and died of the disease in March 1863, leaving Potter as the sole caretaker of their 10-year-old son. In the wake of his wife's death, Potter refused to take office as governor of the Dakota Territory, seeking a more supportive atmosphere for his children.

Potter briefly campaigned for the Republican nomination for the 1863 Wisconsin gubernatorial election, but never ultimately placed his name in nomination at the convention. In June 1864, Potter was a delegate to the 1864 National Union National Convention, and was elected one of the leaders of the Wisconsin delegation. During the convention, he made a notable but ultimately unsuccessful stand to try to prevent the nomination of Andrew Johnson as vice president; his stand did, however, prevent Johnson from securing a unanimous nomination.

In the days after the convention, Potter accepted a foreign service appointment from the Lincoln administration in June 1864, becoming consul general to the then-British province of Canada. He went to reside in Montreal and sent his school-age son, John Kendall, to reside with family in Massachusetts. His son died in Massachusetts that fall, at age 11.

In the Spring of 1865, governor James T. Lewis announced he would not seek re-election in the 1865 Wisconsin gubernatorial election, and several Wisconsin newspapers again suggested Potter as a potential Republican candidate. With Lincoln's assassination and Johnson's ascendance to the presidency in April 1865, Potter lost his main political benefactor in Washington, and would likely not have his consular appointment renewed. In the summer of 1865, Potter attended the Commercial Convention in Detroit, Michigan, a meeting of business leaders from the United States and Canada to clarify trade expectations in the new postwar economy.

Potter was not ultimately removed from office as consul general to Canada, but instead resigned in protest in October 1866. He wrote a scathing resignation letter to President Johnson, explaining why he would be unable to continue to serve under his administration; in particular, Potter was opposed to the rapid restoration of Confederate states' congressional representation and other conciliatory actions taken by the Johnson administration.

After leaving federal office, Potter returned to his homestead in East Troy, largely retired and tending to his farm.

He remained active in political affairs, stumping for the Republican ticket in 1868 and 1870, and his name was discussed around the nominations for governor in 1867 or U.S. senator in 1869, he pre-emptively refused to be considered for lieutenant governor in 1873.

Instead, Potter shocked his former allies in Walworth and Kenosha and apparently broke with the Republicans in 1873 by allowing the Reform coalition to name him as their candidate for Wisconsin Senate in the 8th state Senate district. Potter made no obvious campaign stops for and lost badly in the general election, defeated by regular Republican candidate Thompson Weeks. Potter, after the election, claimed that he had never consented to become a candidate, and had always supported the Republican gubernatorial candidate, his former congressional colleague Cadwallader C. Washburn.

Potter did not stand for election again, but remained active campaigning for Republican candidates and attending Republican state conventions through the 1870s.

Potter's second wife died in March 1882; less than a month later, Potter himself was described as deathly ill, with some papers erroneously reporting his death. He was again reported to be near death later that year, in December 1882. He did not die in 1882, but was almost completely removed from public life after that difficult year. Over the next decade, several Wisconsin papers wrote retrospectives and sort of preemptive obituaries for Potter.

Potter ultimately died of a paralytic stroke on May 18, 1899, a week after his 82nd birthday.

== Personal life and legacy ==
John Fox Potter was the eldest son, and 3rd of 8 children born to John Potter (1787–1865) and his wife Caroline (née Fox; 1789–1872). The elder John Potter was a prominent lawyer in Augusta, Maine, for 55 years; he served two terms in the Maine House of Representatives, and served many years as a town selectman. Potter's paternal grandfather was Reverend Isaiah Butler Potter (1746–1817) of Lebanon, New Hampshire, who took leave from his duties as pastor of the First Congregational Church to serve as a chaplain in the Continental Army during the American Revolutionary War.

John Potter's elder brother was Barrett Potter (1776–1865), who served as a member of the Executive Council of Massachusetts just before the separation of the state of Maine. After the separation, he served as a member of the Maine Senate (1820–1822), then served 25 years as probate judge of Cumberland County, Maine (1822–1847).

John Fox Potter was a descendant of two prominent colonial families of New England; his paternal ancestors were descendants of William Potter (1608–1662), who emigrated to the New Haven Colony in the company of Theophilus Eaton in 1637; his maternal ancestors were descendants of Thomas Fox (1607–1693), who arrived in the Massachusetts Bay Colony in the 1630s. Although not conclusively proven, the Fox family genealogy assumes that Thomas Fox was the grandson of the major English Protestant theologian and historian John Foxe, the author of Foxe's Book of Martyrs.

After Potter settled in Walworth County, his uncle, George Fox—who had initially established a homestead in Michigan—followed him to Wisconsin. John Fox Potter would marry George Fox's two eldest daughters—his first cousins. He married Frances Elizabeth Lewis Fox at Milwaukee on October 15, 1839. They had six children together, but only three survived to adulthood. Frances died at age 45 in 1863, and Potter remarried with her younger sister, Sarah Lewis Fox; this second marriage lasted until Sarah's death in 1882.

Potter's son, Alfred C. Potter, served briefly as a volunteer in the 28th Wisconsin Infantry Regiment during the American Civil War. He enlisted in August 1862, and was promoted to sergeant in Company I, but was discharged due to disability in April 1863.

Potter's last living descendant, Ethel Potter, died in 1946.

After leaving Congress, in 1865, Potter donated over 175 documents from his tenure to Lawrence University, where his daughter was then a student. He also turned over to Lawrence the six-foot folding knife he had received at the 1860 Republican Convention. Lawrence turned the knife over to the Wisconsin Historical Society in 1957.

== Electoral history ==
=== U.S. House (1856, 1858, 1860, 1862) ===
| Year | Election | Date | Elected | | | | Defeated | | | | Total | Plurality |
|---|---|---|---|---|---|---|---|---|---|---|---|---|
| 1856 | General | Nov. 4 | John F. Potter | Republican | 13,120 | 50.59% | Jackson Hadley | Dem. | 12,814 | 49.41% | 25,934 | 306 |
| 1858 | General | Nov. 2 | John F. Potter (inc) | Republican | 14,428 | 56.36% | Beriah Brown | Dem. | 11,171 | 43.64% | 25,599 | 3,257 |
| 1860 | General | Nov. 6 | John F. Potter (inc) | Republican | 16,197 | 54.53% | Jonathan E. Arnold | Dem. | 13,508 | 45.47% | 29,705 | 2,689 |
| 1862 | General | Nov. 4 | James S. Brown | Democratic | 12,598 | 55.56% | John F. Potter (inc) | Rep. | 10,077 | 44.44% | 22,675 | 2,521 |

=== Wisconsin Senate (1873) ===
| Year | Election | Date | Elected | | | | Defeated | | | | Total | Plurality |
|---|---|---|---|---|---|---|---|---|---|---|---|---|
| 1873 | General | Nov. 4 | Thompson Weeks | Republican | 3,207 | 60.30% | John F. Potter | Ref. | 2,111 | 39.70% | 5,318 | 1,096 |

Wisconsin State Assembly
| Preceded by Samuel Pratt | Member of the Wisconsin State Assembly from the Walworth 3rd district January 7, 1856 – January 5, 1857 | Succeeded by Solmous Wakeley |
U.S. House of Representatives
| Preceded by Daniel Wells Jr. | Member of the U.S. House of Representatives from Wisconsin's 1st congressional district March 4, 1857 – March 3, 1863 | Succeeded by James S. Brown |
