= Phineas Hitchcock =

American politician

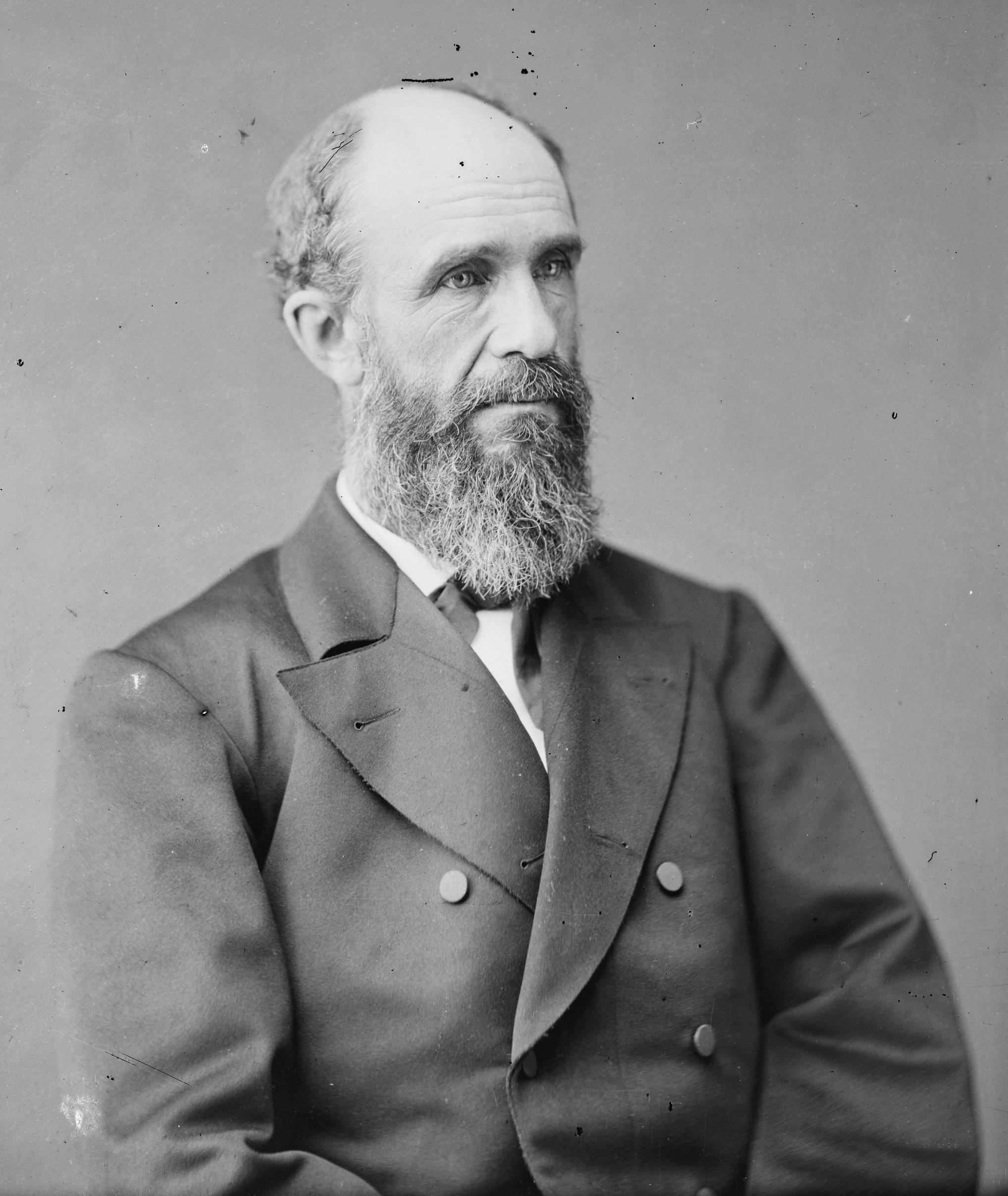

United States Senator from Nebraska
- In office March 4, 1871 – March 3, 1877
- Preceded by: John Thayer
- Succeeded by: Alvin Saunders

Delegate to the U.S. House of Representatives from the Nebraska Territory's at-large district
- In office March 4, 1865 – March 4, 1867
- Preceded by: Samuel Daily
- Succeeded by: Turner M. Marquett (Representative)

Personal details
- Born: Phineas Warrener Hitchcock; November 30, 1831 New Lebanon, New York, U.S.
- Died: July 10, 1881 (aged 49) Omaha, Nebraska, U.S.
- Party: Republican (1854–1866)
- Education: Williams College (BA)

Phineas Warrener (Note: Most sources give his middle name as "Warrener," though a few have simply "Warren.") Hitchcock (November 30, 1831 – July 10, 1881) was an American delegate and a senator from Nebraska. Hitchcock County, Nebraska, is named after him.

== Early life ==
He was born in New Lebanon, Columbia County, New York, the son of Gad Hitchcock and Nancy Prime. When he turned 16, he began two years preparatory course study at the Great Barrington Academy in Great Barrington, Massachusetts.

He entered Williams College in Williamstown, Massachusetts, graduating in 1855. His classmates at Williams included, James A. Garfield, James Gilfillan and John James Ingalls. After he graduated, and after several years of combined law study and journalistic work in New York State, he moved to the Territory of Nebraska in the spring of 1857, locating at Omaha, then a small settlement.

== Career ==
Once in Nebraska, Hitchcock opened a law office, combining with the practice of his profession an agency for several insurance companies and a general real estate business.

=== Political career ===
Hitchcock was appointed a United States Marshal from 1861 to 1864; a Republican, elected as the Nebraska Territory Delegate to the Thirty-ninth Congress and served from March 4, 1865, to March 1, 1867, when the Territory was admitted as a State into the Union. He was appointed surveyor general of Nebraska and Iowa from 1867 to 1869. In 1870, Hitchcock was elected as a Republican to the United States Senate and served from March 4, 1871, to March 3, 1877. He was an unsuccessful candidate for reelection.

Hitchcock served as the chairman of the Committee on Territories in the Forty-fourth Congress. He was involved in newspaper publishing and various businesses.

In 1873 Hitchcock introduced the Timber Culture Act a follow-up act to the Homestead Act. The Timber Culture Act was passed by Congress on March 3 of that year. This act allowed homesteaders to acquire 160 acres of land by planting 40 acres of trees. At the end of eight years from the date of entry, the settler could make final proof if the necessary conditions had been fulfilled. Five additional years were allowed to make proof, or a total of thirteen years from the date of entry. The claimant had to prove that the trees had been planted and cultivated and that not less than 675 living trees per acre had survived. An affidavit or "timber culture proof" had to be completed by the claimant and two witnesses before the final certificate and patents were issued.

== Personal life ==
He married Annie M. Monell on December 27, 1858, at Omaha, Nebraska. She was the daughter of Lucinda Carpenter and Dr. Gilbert C. Monell, an 1839 graduate of the Columbia University College of Physicians and Surgeons and a member of the Old Settlers' Association. She was born in 1837 in Newburgh, New York, and died in 1877 in Omaha, Nebraska. She is buried in Prospect Hill Cemetery.

They were the parents of three children, all born at Omaha, Nebraska: Gilbert Hitchcock, born September 18, 1859, and the founder of the Omaha World-Herald and a U.S. Representative and Senator; Grace Hitchcock, born September 20, 1862; and John Gray Hitchcock, born April 29, 1865.

Hitchcock experienced chronic appendicitis for several years, and he died at the age of 49 at his home in Omaha on July 10, 1881, following the rupture of his appendix.

== Sources ==
- United States Congress. "Phineas Hitchcock (id: H000648)". Biographical Directory of the United States Congress.

U.S. House of Representatives
Preceded by Experience Estabrook	Delegate to the U.S. House of Representatives from the Nebraska Territory's at-large congressional district 1865–1867	Succeeded by Turner M. Marquett as U.S. Representative
U.S. Senate
Preceded by John Thayer	U.S. Senator (Class 2) from Nebraska; 1871–1877; Served alongside: Thomas Tipton, Algernon Paddock	Succeeded by Alvin Saunders
