= Jonathan Earle Arnold =

American lawyer and politician

Jonathan E. Arnold
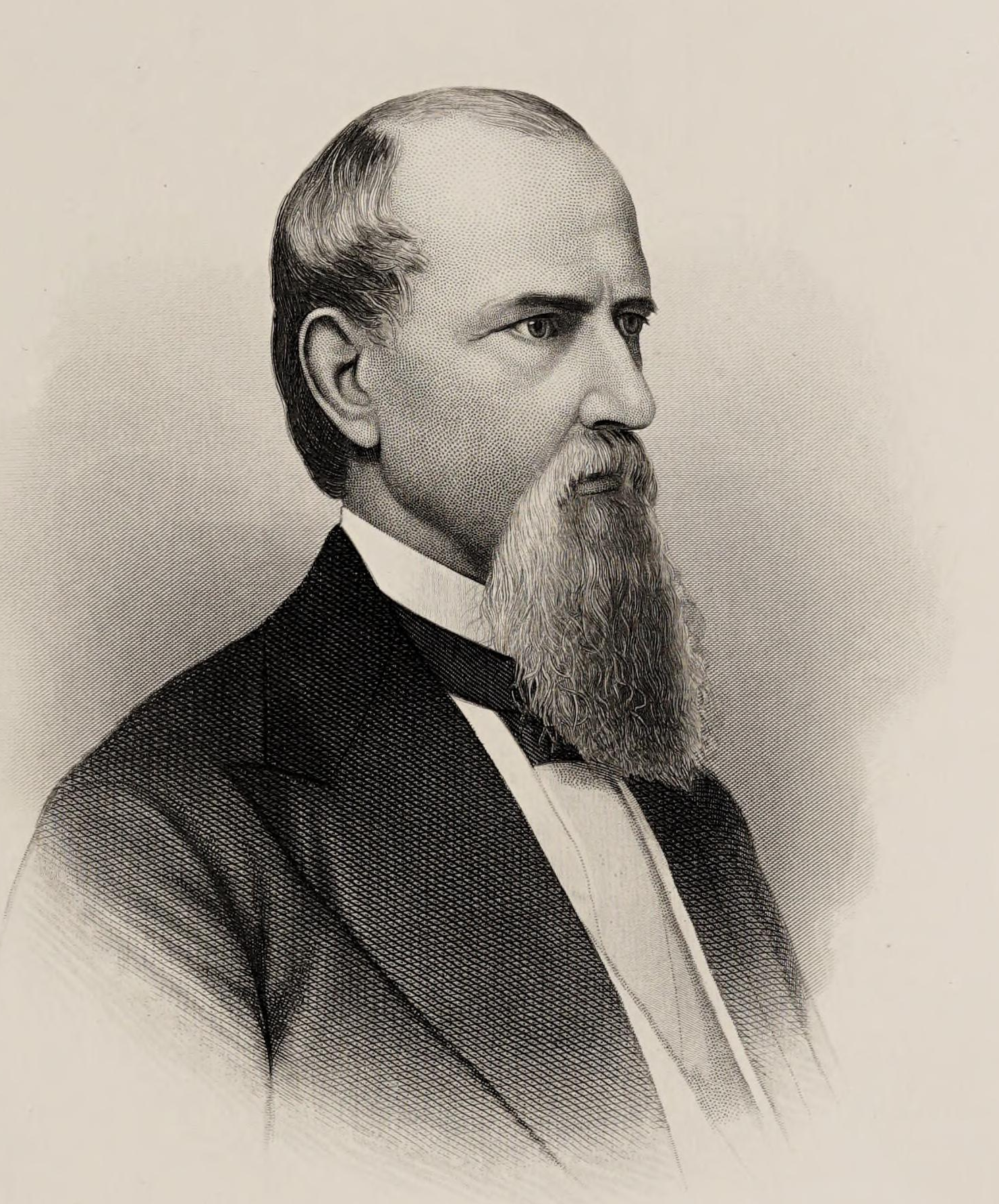

Member of the Council of the Wisconsin Territory from Milwaukee County
- In office December 7, 1840 – December 6, 1841 Serving with James Sutherland
- Preceded by: William A. Prentiss; Daniel Wells, Jr.
- Succeeded by: John Hubbard Tweedy; Don A. J. Upham

Personal details
- Born: February 4, 1814 Woonsocket, Rhode Island
- Died: June 2, 1869 (aged 55)
- Resting place: Forest Home Cemetery; Milwaukee, Wisconsin
- Party: Democratic; Whig (until 1854)
- Education: Brown University

Jonathan Earle Arnold (February 4, 1814 – June 2, 1869) was an American lawyer and politician. He was a member of the Council of the Wisconsin Territory and district attorney of Milwaukee County.

== Biography ==
Arnold was born in Woonsocket, Rhode Island on February 4, 1814. He graduated from Brown University before moving to Milwaukee, Wisconsin in 1836. Arnold died on June 2, 1869.

== Career ==
Arnold served in the Wisconsin Territorial Council from 1840 to 1841 as a member of the Whig Party. During the Wisconsin Territory period, he also served as Milwaukee County District Attorney and ran unsuccessfully for congress. In 1860, after Wisconsin had been admitted to the Union, he ran again for the United States House of Representatives, this time in Wisconsin's 1st congressional district as a Democrat. He lost to incumbent John F. Potter.

As a lawyer, he successfully defended Judge Levi Hubbell in his 1853 impeachment trial, and he was a member of the legal team for William A. Barstow in the contest over the results of the 1855 Wisconsin gubernatorial election.
