= 1863 United States Senate election in Wisconsin =

- January 22, 1863
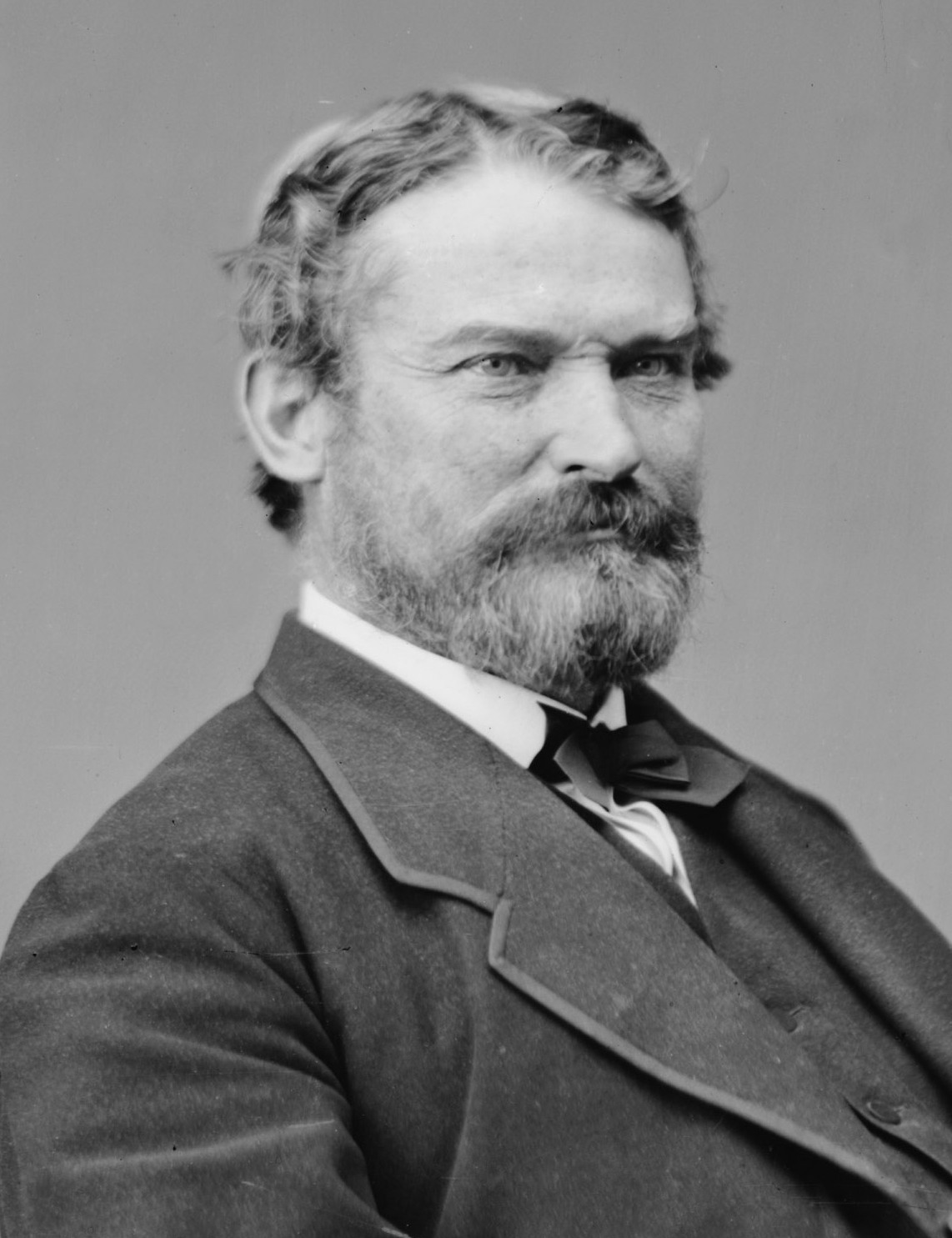

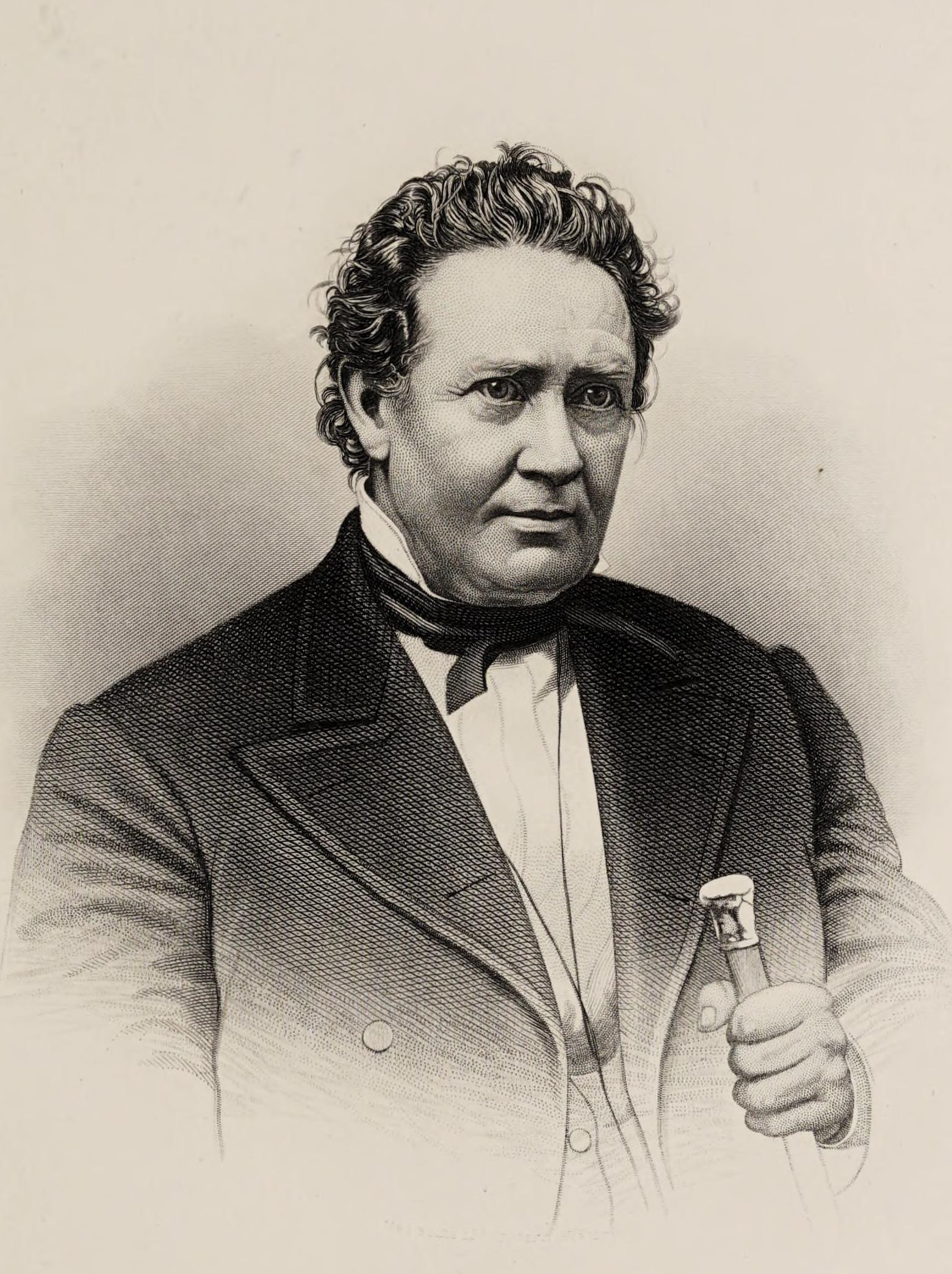
Nominee	James R. Doolittle	Edward G. Ryan	others
Party	Republican	Democratic
Legislative vote	73	57	2
Percentage	55.30%	43.18%	1.52%
U.S. senator before election
James R. Doolittle
Republican
Elected U.S. Senator
James R. Doolittle
Republican

The 1863 United States Senate election in Wisconsin was held in the 16th Wisconsin Legislature on January 22, 1863. Incumbent Republican U.S. senator James R. Doolittle was re-elected on the first ballot.

At the start of the 1863 term, Republicans held majorities in both chambers of the Wisconsin Legislature, but their majorities were bolstered by three "pro-Union" fusion candidates, some of whom had previously been Democrats. Counting only those who were elected as Republicans, they could only afford four defections in the vote for United States senator. The incumbent, Doolittle, faced opposition from the Radical Republican wing of the party, but other candidates were reluctant to seek the nomination.

== Major candidates ==
=== Democratic ===
- Edward George Ryan, a prominent lawyer in Milwaukee.

=== Republican ===
- James R. Doolittle, incumbent U.S. senator.
- John F. Potter, also known by the nickname "Bowie Knife Potter", outgoing U.S. representative of Wisconsin's 1st congressional district.
- Cadwallader C. Washburn, Union Army general and former U.S. representative of Wisconsin's 2nd congressional district.

== Results ==
=== Republican nomination ===
Prior to the legislative caucus, Radical Republicans pushed for the nomination of U.S. representative John F. Potter, though Potter himself did not endorse the effort. The caucus first met on the evening of January 20 and took an informal poll, finding Doolittle had the support of 43 of 72 voting members—enough for the nomination; Potter received 19 votes. The caucus adjourned for the evening and met again on January 1, at which time they took a formal vote. On the formal ballot, Doolittle received 53 votes and was declared the party's nominee.

=== Official vote ===
The 16th Wisconsin Legislature met in joint session on January 22, 1863, to elect a U.S. senator. The voting went along party lines, with only one Republican member absent. James R. Doolittle received the votes of all other Republicans and Union legislators, winning the election.

1st Vote of the 16th Wisconsin Legislature, January 22, 1863
Party	Candidate	Votes	%
Republican	James R. Doolittle (incumbent)	73 (Note: Doolittle received the votes of all Republicans and Union members except representative George Hyer (who was absent).)	55.30%
Democratic	Edward G. Ryan	57 (Note: Ryan received the votes of all Democrats except representatives James B. Frazell and William H. Smith (who voted for others).)	43.18%
Republican	Matthew H. Carpenter	1 (Note: Democratic representative James B. Frazell voted for Matthew H. Carpenter.)	0.76%
Democratic	James S. Brown	1 (Note: Democratic representative William H. Smith voted for James S. Brown.)	0.76%
	Absent	1	
Majority		67	50.76%
Total votes		132	99.25%
Republican hold			
