= S. Park Coon =

American lawyer and politician (1820–1883)

2nd Attorney General of Wisconsin
- In office January 7, 1850 – January 5, 1852
- Governor: Nelson Dewey
- Preceded by: James S. Brown
- Succeeded by: Experience Estabrook

District Attorney of Milwaukee County, Wisconsin
- In office January 1, 1863 – January 1, 1865
- Preceded by: Joshua Stark
- Succeeded by: Jedd P. C. Cottrill

Personal details
- Born: March 28, 1820 Covington, New York
- Died: October 12, 1883 (aged 63) Milwaukee, Wisconsin
- Cause of death: Tuberculosis
- Resting place: Forest Home Cemetery; Milwaukee, Wisconsin
- Party: Democratic
- Spouse: Sarah Vincent (m. 1844–1912)
- Children: Philip Vincent Coon^{(b. 1844; died 1891)}; Kate Coon^{(b. 1848; died 1848)}; Bessie Coon^{(b. 1850; died 1851)}

Military service
- Allegiance: United States
- Branch/service: United States Army; Union Army
- Years of service: 1861
- Rank: Colonel, USV
- Commands: 2nd Reg. Wis. Vol. Infantry
- Battles/wars: American Civil War: Manassas campaign; Battle of Blackburn's Ford; First Battle of Bull Run

Squire Park Coon (March 28, 1820 – October 12, 1883) was an American lawyer, politician, and Wisconsin pioneer. He was the 2nd Attorney General of Wisconsin and served as a Union Army officer in the American Civil War.

== Early life and career ==
Coon was born on March 28, 1820, in Covington, New York. He was educated at Alexander Academy and Norwich University and then studied law in New York. In 1843, Coon moved to Milwaukee, Wisconsin Territory, where he set up a legal practice. He rose in prominence in the new state and, in 1849, he was elected the 2nd Attorney General of Wisconsin running on the Democratic ticket alongside incumbent Governor Nelson Dewey. After one term in office however, Coon announced that he would not be a candidate for renomination at the 1851 Democratic state convention.

Coon continued to work as a lawyer in Milwaukee, but was one of several early Wisconsin politicians caught up in scandals related to misappropriations of state funds. For Coon, he was granted about $667 (about $19,000 adjusted for inflation to 2019) for collection of funds associated with canal mortgages. Nevertheless, Coon remained a leading member of the Democratic Party in Milwaukee and was an outspoken supporter of Stephen A. Douglas in the 1860 United States presidential election. He also undertook a years long unsuccessful crusade in the legislature and courts to secure relief for farmers who had mortgaged their land to aid in building railroads in the state.

== Civil War service ==
At the outbreak of the American Civil War, despite his politics, Coon was commissioned colonel of the 2nd Wisconsin Infantry Regiment by Governor Alexander Randall. The regiment was organized in May 1861 at Camp Randall, in Madison, Wisconsin, and mustered into service June 11. Colonel Coon led the regiment to Washington where they camped briefly on Meridian Hill. However, shortly after their arrival, Colonel Coon was removed from command and given an assignment by the War Department to oversee the mustering of additional Wisconsin regiments. Aside from the official explanation, there were other theories as to his dismissal, ranging from rumors about his alcoholism to allegations of Republicans in the War Department attempting to oust prominent Democrats from command positions.

Nevertheless, when the Army marched toward battle on July 16, Colonel Coon requested to accompany them as a volunteer advisor to Colonel William Tecumseh Sherman, who commanded the brigade to which the 2nd Wisconsin was attached. Accounts of the First Battle of Bull Run, including remarks attributed to Colonel Sherman, describe that Colonel Coon briefly attempted to rally the regiment during the disorganized retreat from the Bull Run field, and may have managed to cover some of the retreat.

Colonel Coon formally resigned from command of the 2nd Wisconsin on July 30, 1861, along with Lt. Colonel Peck, who had commanded the regiment on the Manassas campaign. Although he was officially planning to raise a company of cavalry to join the new brigade being mustered under General Rufus King, he ultimately did not return to military service.

== Later years ==
Coon resumed his law practice in Milwaukee, and, in 1862, was elected district attorney for Milwaukee County. Though he sought renomination for another term as district attorney, the Milwaukee county democrats instead nominated Jedd P. C. Cottrill. Coon's legal career declined amidst worsening alcoholism. He was sustained through his later years by the charity of friends and former colleagues.

He died of Tuberculosis on October 12, 1883, at Passavant hospital in Milwaukee.

== Personal life and family ==
Coon married Sarah Vincent and had at least three children, though their two daughters died as infants. At the time of his death, he was estranged from his family, with his wife having returned to New York and his son living in Chicago.

== Electoral history ==
=== Wisconsin Attorney General (1849) ===
Wisconsin Attorney General Election, 1849
Party	Candidate	Votes	%	±%
General Election, November 5, 1968
Democratic	S. Park Coon	17,079	53.55%	−2.45%
Whig	Moses B. Butterfield	10,981	34.43%	−9.57%
Free Soil	Marshall Strong	3,768	11.81%	
	Scattering	65	0.20%	
Plurality		6,098	19.12%	+7.12%
Total votes		31,893	100.0%	+0.41%
Democratic hold				

Military offices
Regiment established	Command of the 2nd Wisconsin Volunteer Infantry Regiment; April 24, 1861 – July 30, 1861	Succeeded by Edgar O'Connor
Party political offices
Preceded by James S. Brown	Democratic nominee for Attorney General of Wisconsin; 1849	Succeeded by Experience Estabrook
Legal offices
Preceded by James S. Brown	Attorney General of Wisconsin; January 7, 1850 – January 5, 1852	Succeeded by Experience Estabrook
Preceded by Joshua Stark	District Attorney of Milwaukee County, Wisconsin; January 1, 1863 – January 1, 1865	Succeeded by Jedd P. C. Cottrill
