= James S. Brown =

American politician (1824-1878)

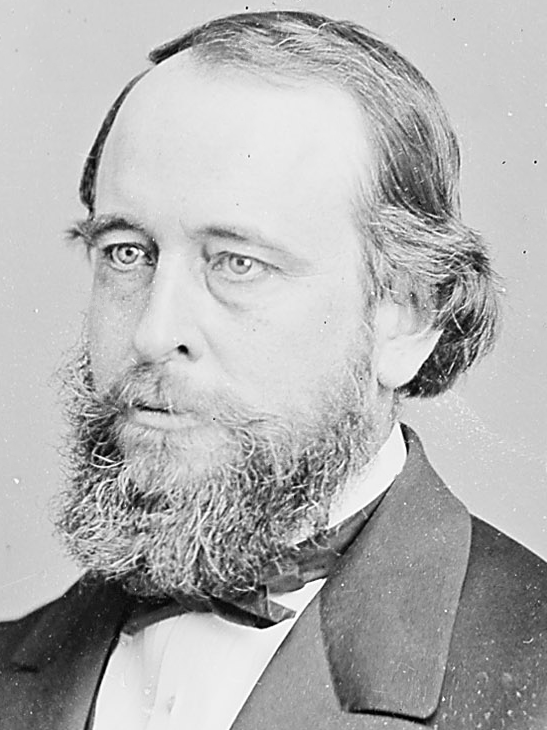
- James Brown ca.1860-65

Member of the U.S. House of Representatives from Wisconsin's 1st district
- In office March 4, 1863 – March 3, 1865
- Preceded by: John F. Potter
- Succeeded by: Halbert Eleazer Paine

13th Mayor of Milwaukee
- In office April 1861 – April 1862
- Preceded by: William Pitt Lynde
- Succeeded by: Horace Chase

1st Attorney General of Wisconsin
- In office June 7, 1848 – January 7, 1850
- Governor: Nelson Dewey
- Preceded by: A. Hyatt Smith (territorial government)
- Succeeded by: S. Park Coon

Personal details
- Born: February 1, 1824 Hampden, Maine, U.S.
- Died: April 15, 1878 (aged 54) Chicago, Illinois, U.S.
- Resting place: Forest Home Cemetery, Milwaukee, Wisconsin
- Party: Democratic
- Spouses: Elizabeth Shepard (m. 1855; died 1863); Emily Jane (Pierce) Stetson (m. 1865)
- Children: 2
- Parents: Enoch Brown (father); Melinda (Padelford) Brown (mother)
- Profession: Lawyer, politician

James Sproat Brown (February 1, 1824 – April 15, 1878) was an American lawyer, Democratic politician, and Wisconsin pioneer. He was the first Attorney General of Wisconsin (1848–1850), the 13th mayor of Milwaukee (1861–1862), and represented Wisconsin's 1st congressional district in the U.S. House of Representatives for the 38th Congress (1863–1865).

== Early life and education ==
Brown was born in Hampden, Penobscot County, Maine, to Enoch Brown and his wife, the former Melinda Padelford, on February 1, 1824. He received private education from Professor Joseph Emerson Worcester, completing a college-level education by the time he was 16. His father died that same year. The 16-year-old Brown moved west to Cincinnati, Ohio, studying law and learning to speak German, supporting himself by teaching school. Because the Ohio State Bar Association did not permit members under age 20, Brown was admitted to the neighboring Kentucky Bar Association at age 18.

== Career ==
Brown remained in Cincinnati and was admitted to the Ohio State Bar in 1843. While living there, he became acquainted with Catholic priest Father John Henni who, in 1843, became the first Archbishop of Milwaukee. In 1844, Archbishop Henni convinced Brown to follow him to Milwaukee. Although only 21, Brown quickly distinguished himself as an attorney in the Wisconsin Territory and, in 1845, was elected prosecuting attorney of Milwaukee County.

Brown soon established a law partnership with Thomas L. Ogden, who was from New York (and with whom he lived), and James Halliday. In 1848, in the election that also ratified the Constitution of Wisconsin, Brown was elected on the Democratic Party ticket as the state's first Attorney General—he was 24 years old. Though a candidate for renomination in 1849, the Democratic party instead nominated S. Park Coon at their convention in Madison on the first ballot.

In the heated political climate preceding the American Civil War, an arsonist tried to burn down his house in 1858 but only succeeded in destroying a woodshed. Brown was also part of a group that attempted to establish a law school in Milwaukee, but failed, so the fledgling Milwaukee Bar Association remained a social group. Elected—without opposition—the 13th mayor of Milwaukee in 1860, Brown took office in 1861, restored the city's credit, purchased the city's first steam engine fire truck, and paid the fire company. He declined to run for re-election in 1862, facing criticism for his handling of a bank riot in June 1861 as well as for cuts in the police budget.

Instead, in 1862, Brown ran for Congress as a War Democrat and defeated incumbent Republican John F. Potter to represent Wisconsin's 1st congressional district. He served one term in the United States House of Representatives during the 38th Congress, from March 4, 1863, to March 3, 1865. In 1864 he ran for re-election but was denounced as anti-Union and ultimately withdrew from the race. Union General Halbert E. Paine, a Republican, succeeded to the seat. Brown would challenge him and lose in 1866.

After his loss in 1866 and suffering from health problems, Brown traveled to Europe with his second wife, Emily. By 1869 the Browns were in Dresden in the Kingdom of Saxony (present-day Germany). They returned to the United States in 1873, where he practiced law once again in Milwaukee and managed his various real estate investments.

== Personal life and family ==
Brown married twice. His first wife, the former Elizabeth Shepard (1835–1863) of New York, was a decade his junior and they had sons Clarence S. Brown (1856–1925) and James (1859–1913). Elizabeth died in 1863 shortly after Brown began his term in Congress.

In 1865, after leaving office, Brown married Emily J. Stetson (1837–1918) the daughter of former Maine Congressman Charles Stetson, who had died in 1863. They had no children, and she survived him.

Brown's elder son Clarence was also elected district attorney of Milwaukee County, serving in the 1890s.

== Death and legacy ==
Brown died in 1878 in Chicago, Illinois, at age 54, survived by his two sons and second wife. After a service in his Milwaukee home led by a Unitarian minister, his body was interred beside his first wife at Milwaukee's Forest Home Cemetery, where his sons would also be buried. His former house in Milwaukee (a double structure he built in 1852) survives, the oldest house in the former Yankee Hill neighborhood, and is a historic site. His son Clarence Brown graduated from Harvard Law School and became an alderman.

== Electoral history ==
=== Wisconsin Attorney General (1848) ===
Wisconsin Attorney General Election, 1848
Party	Candidate	Votes	%	±%
General Election, May 8, 1848
Democratic	James S. Brown	17,788	56.00%	
Whig	Henry S. Baird	13,975	44.00%	
Plurality		3,813	12.00%	
Total votes		31,763	100.0%	
Democratic win (new seat)				

=== Wisconsin Attorney General (1849) ===
Wisconsin Attorney General Election, 1849
Party	Candidate	Votes	%	±%
Vote of the Wisconsin Democratic Convention, September 6, 1849
Democratic	S. Park Coon	34	54.84%	
Democratic	James S. Brown (incumbent)	14	22.58%	
Democratic	George Baldwin Smith	5	8.06%	
Democratic	Edward George Ryan	4	6.45%	
Democratic	F. C. Fairchild	2	3.23%	
Democratic	Experience Estabrook	2	3.23%	
	Blank	1	1.61%	
Plurality		20	32.26%	
Total votes		62	100.0%	

=== U.S. House of Representatives (1862) ===
Wisconsin's 1st Congressional District Election, 1862
Party	Candidate	Votes	%	±%
General Election, November 4, 1862
Democratic	James S. Brown	12,598	55.56%	+10.09%
Republican	John F. Potter (incumbent)	10,077	44.44%	
Plurality		2,521	11.12%	+2.07%
Total votes		22,675	100.0%	-23.67%
Democratic gain from Republican		Swing	20.17%	

=== U.S. House of Representatives (1866) ===
Wisconsin's 1st Congressional District Election, 1866
Party	Candidate	Votes	%	±%
General Election, November 4, 1866
National Union	Halbert E. Paine (incumbent)	14,678	58.77%	+10.09%
Democratic	James S. Brown	10,298	41.23%	−7.87%
Plurality		4,380	17.54%	+15.73%
Total votes		22,675	100.0%	-7.31%
National Union hold				

Party political offices
New state	Democratic nominee for Attorney General of Wisconsin; 1848	Succeeded by S. Park Coon
Legal offices
Preceded by A. Hyatt Smith (Wisconsin Territory)	Attorney General of Wisconsin; 1848 – 1850	Succeeded by S. Park Coon
Political offices
Preceded by William Pitt Lynde	Mayor of Milwaukee, Wisconsin; 1861 – 1862	Succeeded by Horace Chase
U.S. House of Representatives
Preceded by John F. Potter	Member of the U.S. House of Representatives from Wisconsin's 1st congressional district March 4, 1863 – March 3, 1865	Succeeded by Halbert Eleazer Paine
