= Jedd Philo Clark Cottrill =

American politician (1832–1889)

Jedd P. C. Cottrill
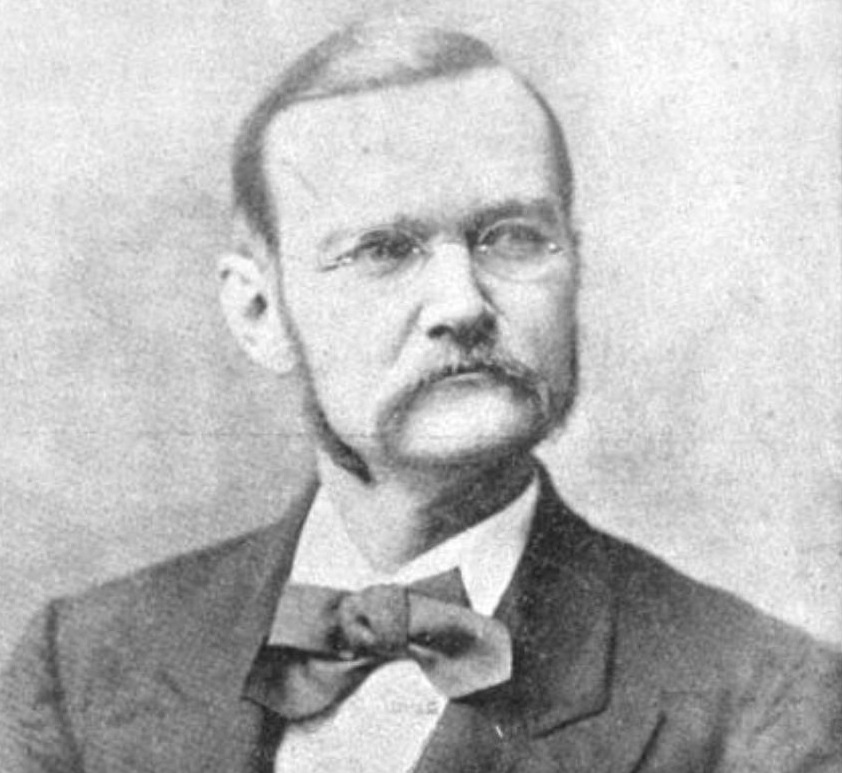

Member of the Wisconsin Senate from the 5th district
- In office January 1, 1883 – January 1887
- Preceded by: Isaac W. Van Schaick
- Succeeded by: Theodore Fritz

District Attorney of Milwaukee County, Wisconsin
- In office January 2, 1865 – January 7, 1867
- Preceded by: S. Park Coon
- Succeeded by: C. K. Martin

Personal details
- Born: April 15, 1832 Montpelier, Vermont, U.S.
- Died: February 8, 1889 (aged 56) Milwaukee, Wisconsin, U.S.
- Cause of death: Tuberculosis
- Resting place: Forest Home Cemetery, Milwaukee
- Party: Democratic
- Spouse: Ellen M. Camp (died 1915)
- Education: University of Vermont
- Profession: Lawyer

Jedd Philo Clark Cottrill (April 15, 1832 – February 8, 1889) was an American lawyer, Democratic politician, and Wisconsin pioneer. He was a member of the Wisconsin State Senate, representing northern Milwaukee County during the 1883 and 1885 sessions.

== Biography ==
Cottrill was born on April 15, 1832, in Montpelier, Vermont. He graduated from the University of Vermont in 1852, taught school while studying law with the firm of Peck & Colby, and attained admission to the bar. He moved to Milwaukee, Wisconsin, in 1855.

== Career ==
Cottrill practiced law in Milwaukee. He served as district attorney of Milwaukee County from 1865 to 1867. He later served as a commissioner for the federal district courts in Wisconsin, and was a member of the committee appointed to organize and revise Wisconsin's statutes in 1878. He was a member of the State Senate from 1883 to 1885.

Cottrill died of tuberculosis on February 8, 1889. He was buried at Milwaukee's historic Forest Home Cemetery.

Wisconsin Senate
| Preceded by Isaac W. Van Schaick | Member of the Wisconsin Senate from the 5th district January 1, 1883 – January 3, 1887 | Succeeded by Theodore Fritz |
Legal offices
| Preceded by S. Park Coon | District Attorney of Milwaukee County, Wisconsin; January 2, 1865 – January 7, 1867 | Succeeded by C. K. Martin |
