= Samuel Gordon Daily =

American politician (1823–1866)

Samuel Daily
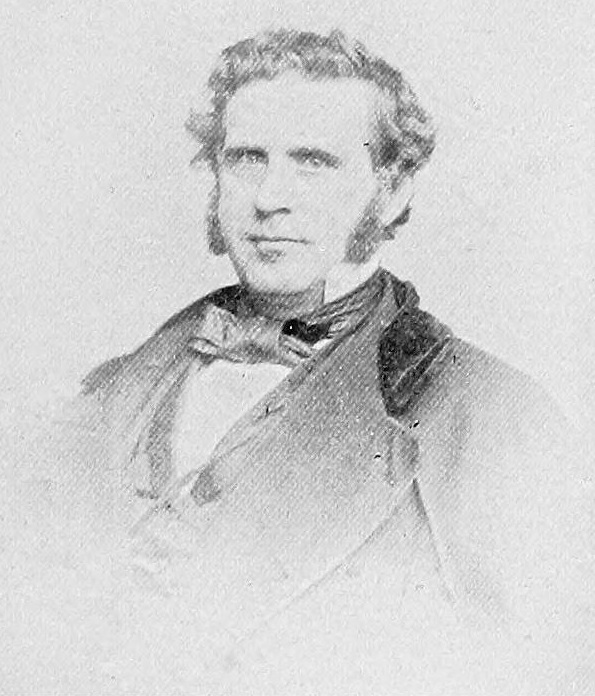

Delegate to the U.S. House of Representatives from the Nebraska Territory's at-large district
- In office May 18, 1860 – March 3, 1865
- Preceded by: Experience Estabrook
- Succeeded by: Phineas Hitchcock

Personal details
- Born: Samuel Gordon Daily; 1823 Trimble County, Kentucky, U.S.
- Died: August 15, 1866 (aged 42–43) New Orleans, Louisiana, U.S.
- Party: Free Soil (Before 1854); Republican (1854–1866)
- Education: Hanover College

Samuel Gordon Daily (1823 – August 15, 1866) was an American politician from the Nebraska Territory.

He was born in Trimble County, Kentucky. Daily moved with his parents to Jefferson County, Indiana in 1824, where he attended the common schools and Hanover College in Hanover, Indiana. Daily then studied law and was admitted to the bar in Indianapolis, Indiana and commenced practice in Madison, Indiana. He was an unsuccessful candidate of the Free Soil Party for election to the Indiana General Assembly; he then moved to Indianapolis and was engaged in the cooperage business.

In 1857, he moved to Nebraska Territory, and settled in Peru, Nebraska, in Nemaha County, Nebraska. Daily built a sawmill on the Missouri River and in 1858 became a member of the Nebraska Territorial House of Representatives. In this position, he was one of the first in Nebraska to declare himself a Republican. Daily was a radical and outspoken abolitionist. He also introduced the first bill to abolish slavery in the Territory. The bill failed.

Samuel Daily successfully contested as a Republican the election of Experience Estabrook to the Thirty-sixth United States Congress. The next election for the Thirty-seventh Congress was also contested. This time the opponent was J. Sterling Morton; the founder of Arbor Day. Again, Daily won the contest. He was reelected to the Thirty-eighth Congress without a contest. He served in Congress from May 18, 1860, to March 3, 1865.

In March 1865, he was appointed deputy collector of customs in New Orleans, Louisiana at the special request of President Abraham Lincoln. He died of yellow fever in New Orleans, Louisiana on August 15, 1866. He was buried in Mount Vernon Cemetery in Peru, Nebraska.

U.S. House of Representatives
Preceded by Experience Estabrook	Delegate to the U.S. House of Representatives from the Nebraska Territory's at-large congressional district 1860–1865	Succeeded by Phineas Hitchcock
