= John Potter (Maine lawyer) =

American politician (1787–1865)

Member of the Maine House of Representatives from the Kennebec County district
- In office January 1, 1835 – January 1, 1837 Serving with 23 others (Multi-member district)

Personal details
- Born: April 7, 1787 Lebanon, New Hampshire, U.S.
- Died: May 11, 1865 (aged 78) Augusta, Maine, U.S.
- Resting place: Forest Grove Cemetery, Augusta
- Party: Whig
- Spouse: Caroline Fox (m. 1812–1865)
- Children: Caroline Fox (Deering)^{(b. 1813; died 1896)}; Sarah Elizabeth (Ladd)^{(b. 1815; died 1903)}; John Fox Potter^{(b. 1817; died 1899)}; Barrett Edwards Potter^{(b. 1819; died 1901)}; Charles Fox Potter^{(b. 1821; died 1867)}; George Fox Potter^{(b. 1823; died 1893)}; Mary Barrett Potter^{(b. 1825; died 1894)}; Anna Augusta Potter^{(b. 1827; died 1919)}
- Relatives: Barrett Potter (brother)
- Education: Dartmouth College
- Profession: Lawyer

John Potter (April 7, 1787 – May 11, 1865) was an American lawyer and Whig politician from Augusta, Maine. He represented Kennebec County for two terms in the Maine House of Representatives (1835, 1836).

His eldest son was John Fox "Bowie Knife" Potter, who represented southeast Wisconsin for three terms in the U.S. House of Representatives and became a minor abolitionist celebrity for standing up to a southern politician's duel threat in 1860.

John Potter was also a brother of Barrett Potter, who served as a member of the Executive Council of Massachusetts and the Maine Senate.

== Biography ==
John Potter was born in Lebanon, New Hampshire, in 1787; he was raised and educated in that area. After completing his collegiate education at Dartmouth College in 1806, he studied law in the law office of his elder brother, Barrett Potter. He was admitted to the bar in 1810, and moved to the town of Augusta, Massachusetts (now Augusta, Maine), to begin his own law practice.

Potter quickly developed a good reputation as a lawyer and counselor, and was elected to several local offices, including many years as town selectman. In 1834 and 1835, he was elected to represent Kennebec County in the Maine House of Representatives.

== Personal life and family ==
John Potter was the fourth of five children born to Reverend Isaiah Butler Potter (1746–1817) and his wife Elizabeth (née Barrett; 1758–1831). Reverend Potter—an Orthodox Congregationalist minister—was the first settled minister in Lebanon, New Hampshire, but took leave from his duties as pastor of the First Congregational Church to serve as a chaplain in the Continental Army during the American Revolutionary War.

John Potter's elder brother, Barrett Potter (1776–1865), served as a member of the Executive Council of Massachusetts just before the separation of the state of Maine. After the separation, he served as a member of the Maine Senate (1820–1822), then served 25 years as probate judge of Cumberland County, Maine (1822–1847).

The Potter family were descendants of William Potter (1608–1662), who emigrated to the New Haven Colony in the company of Theophilus Eaton in 1637.

John Potter married Caroline Fox on June 16, 1812. Caroline Fox was a daughter of prominent lawyer John Fox of Portland, Maine. With Caroline, Potter had nine children, all of whom survived him.

His eldest son was John Fox Potter (1817–1899), who represented southeast Wisconsin for three terms in the U.S. House of Representatives (1857–1863). John Fox Potter was nicknamed "Bowie Knife Potter" after he demanded to use the bowie knife as his weapon when he was challenged to a duel in 1860 by Virginia U.S. representative Roger A. Pryor; the duel never ultimately took place, but the affair was widely covered by political newspapers around the country, turning Potter into an abolitionist celebrity for standing up to southern threats.
