= Covington, New York =

- Town
- Location within Wyoming County and New York

- Location within the state of New York
- Coordinates: 42°50′23″N 78°0′41″W
- Country: United States
- State: New York
- County: Wyoming

Area
  - Total: 26.14 sq mi (67.70 km^{2})
  - Land: 26.14 sq mi (67.70 km^{2})
  - Water: 0 sq mi (0.00 km^{2})
- Elevation: 991 ft (302 m)

Population (2010)
  - Total: 1,232
  - Estimate (2016): 1,205
  - Density: 46/sq mi (17.8/km^{2})
- Time zone: UTC-5 (Eastern (EST))
  - Summer (DST): UTC-4 (EDT)
- FIPS code: 36-18696
- GNIS feature ID: 0978875
- Website: Town of Covington

Covington is an incorporated town in Wyoming County, New York. The population was 1,231 at the 2010 census. The town was named after General Leonard Covington. The Town of Covington is on eastern border of the county.

== History ==
The Town of Covington was created in 1817 from the Towns of Perry and Le Roy (in Genesee County).

== Geography ==
According to the United States Census Bureau, the town has a total area of 26.1 square miles (68 km^{2}), all land.

The Oatka Creek flows through the Wyoming Valley in the town.

== Demographics ==
Historical population
Census	Pop.	Note	%±
1820	2,144		—
1830	2,716		26.7%
1840	2,438		−10.2%
1850	1,385		−43.2%
1860	1,286		−7.1%
1870	1,189		−7.5%
1880	1,176		−1.1%
1890	1,151		−2.1%
1900	930		−19.2%
1910	923		−0.8%
1920	788		−14.6%
1930	696		−11.7%
1940	698		0.3%
1950	789		13.0%
1960	827		4.8%
1970	953		15.2%
1980	1,075		12.8%
1990	1,266		17.8%
2000	1,357		7.2%
2010	1,232		−9.2%
2016 (est.)	1,205		−2.2%
U.S. Decennial Census

As of the census of 2000, there were 1,357 people, 473 households, and 377 families residing in the town. The population density was 51.9 inhabitants per square mile (20.0/km^{2}). There were 491 housing units at an average density of 18.8 per square mile (7.3/km^{2}). The racial makeup of the town was 97.27% White, 0.15% African American, 0.37% Native American, 0.29% Asian, 0.29% from other races, and 1.62% from two or more races. Hispanic or Latino of any race were 0.96% of the population.

There were 473 households, out of which 34.5% had children under the age of 18 living with them, 67.0% were married couples living together, 7.2% had a female householder with no husband present, and 20.1% were non-families. 15.4% of all households were made up of individuals, and 4.4% had someone living alone who was 65 years of age or older. The average household size was 2.87 and the average family size was 3.15.

In the town, the population was spread out, with 27.6% under the age of 18, 7.3% from 18 to 24, 30.3% from 25 to 44, 24.6% from 45 to 64, and 10.2% who were 65 years of age or older. The median age was 37 years. For every 100 females, there were 104.1 males. For every 100 females age 18 and over, there were 106.3 males.

The median income for a household in the town was $40,446, and the median income for a family was $41,683. Males had a median income of $28,676 versus $23,417 for females. The per capita income for the town was $15,745. About 5.5% of families and 8.1% of the population were below the poverty line, including 17.1% of those under age 18 and 3.9% of those age 65 or over.

== Notable people ==
- S. Park Coon, former Wisconsin Attorney General, served in the 2nd Wisconsin Volunteer Infantry Regiment as colonel in American Civil War

== Communities and locations in Covington ==
- Boyds Corners – A location in the northeast town corner.
- Covington – A hamlet, also known as Covington Center, located at Route 246.
- LaGrange – A hamlet on Route 246 on the south town line.
- Orrs Corners – A location in the northeast corner of the town.
- Pearl Creek – A hamlet near the north town line on Route 19.
- Peoria – A hamlet on Route 63 near the eastern town line.
- Quinlans Corners – A location in the northeast town corner.
- Spragues Corners – A hamlet between Covington and Pearl Creek.
- Wyoming Valley – A valley on the western edge of the town, containing Oatka Creek.
