= G. Estabrook =

American classical composer

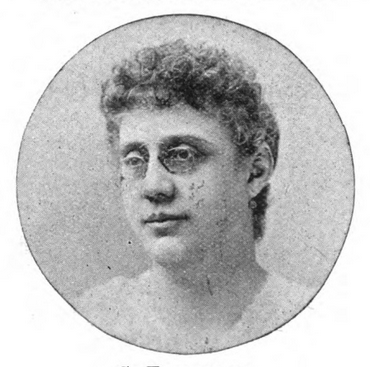
G. Estabrook (1895)

G. Estabrook is the pen name used by composer and singer Caroline Augusta "Gussie" Clowry (October 23, 1845 – April 18, 1897), whose opera The Joust was the first opera by an American woman to be published. With musical talent from an early age, "Gussie" had many songs published throughout her life, one of which "reached the extraordinary sale of over one million copies."

== Biography ==
Born on October 23, 1845, in Geneva, Wisconsin, she was the only daughter of General Experience Estabrook and Caroline Augusta Maxwell. She had one brother, Henry Dodge, who was nine years younger. In January 1855, General Experience Estabrook moved with his family to Omaha, Nebraska after being appointed United States Attorney by President Franklin Pierce. In 1860, at the age of 15, she met Colonel Robert Charles Clowry of Chicago, the superintendent of the Missouri and Western Union Telegraph Company; and later, president and general manager of the Western Union Telegraph Company. They were wed five years later, on August 29, 1865, in Omaha, Nebraska. By 1879, the couple had moved to St. Louis before settling in Chicago.

In 1882, the first production of "The Joust" was performed in her home town of Omaha, with her mother and brother both performing major roles. In 1885, the Chicago Music Company published the complete opera, making it the first opera by an American woman to be published. The opera, however, was written five years earlier when "Gussie" held a local contest for a story she could base an opera upon. Her younger brother, Henry, submitted the story of The Joust and won. For the 1882 production, Henry reworked the plot and largely changed the libretto. The work is, therefore, a joint effort between the two siblings.

By 1896, her health was fading, and so she spent a summer abroad in Europe with her mother and friends in the hopes that her health would recover. It did not, and she died in Lincoln, Nebraska, from apoplectic paralysis on April 18, 1897. She was survived by her husband, brother, and both parents.
