= Barrett Potter =

American judge (1776–1865)

Member of the Maine Senate from the Cumberland County district
- In office May 31, 1820 – January 1, 1822 Serving with Joseph Foxcraft & Jonathan Page

Member of the Executive Council of Massachusetts
- In office June 3, 1819 – March 15, 1820

Personal details
- Born: May 8, 1776 Lebanon, New Hampshire, U.S.
- Died: November 16, 1865 (aged 89) Portland, Maine, U.S.
- Resting place: Evergreen Cemetery, Portland
- Spouse: Anne Storer (m. 1809; died 1821)
- Children: Elizabeth Ann Potter^{(b. 1810; died 1890)}; Mary Storer (Longfellow)^{(b. 1812; died 1835)}; Margaret Louisa (Thacher)^{(b. 1813; died 1901)}; Louisa Potter^{(b. 1814; died 1814)}; John B. Potter^{(b. 1815; died 1815)}; Frances L. Potter^{(b. 1821; died 1822)}
- Relatives: John Potter (brother); John Fox Potter (nephew); Henry Wadsworth Longfellow (son-in-law)
- Education: Dartmouth College
- Profession: Lawyer

Barrett Potter (May 8, 1776 – November 16, 1865) was an American lawyer and judge from Portland, Maine. He served one year on the Executive Council of Massachusetts (1819) in the year before the separation of the state of Maine. After Maine's statehood, he served in the first two terms of the Maine Senate (1820–1822). He then served 25 years as probate judge of Cumberland County, Maine, from 1822 until his retirement in 1847.

His daughter, Mary, was the first wife of poet Henry Wadsworth Longfellow.

His brother, John Potter, was also a prominent lawyer and elected official in Maine. John Potter's son, Barrett's nephew, was John Fox "Bowie Knife" Potter, who represented southeast Wisconsin for three terms in the U.S. House of Representatives and became a minor abolitionist celebrity for standing up to a southern politician's duel threat in 1860.

== Biography ==
Barrett Potter was born in Lebanon, New Hampshire, on May 8, 1776. He was raised and educated there, and received a collegiate education at Dartmouth College. After college, he began studying law under Benjamin Gilbert, but finished his legal education under his uncle, John Barrett VI (1756–1816).

He was admitted to practice law in 1801, moved to North Yarmouth, Massachusetts (now North Yarmouth, Maine), and opened a law practice. After four years, he moved to Gorham, but remained only briefly before accepting an offer to join a legal partnership with Salmon Chase in Portland, Maine. Salmon Chase was an elder brother of Potter's college friend Philander Chase, and their nephew Salmon P. Chase would later be chief justice of the U.S. Supreme Court. Shortly after Potter's admission to the partnership, however, Salmon Chase died; another senior partner, William Symmes, died around the same time, and a 3rd senior partner, Isaac Parker, was appointed to the Massachusetts Supreme Judicial Court. The succession of exits left Potter with large responsibility for the upkeep of the firm. The partnership endured, and Barrett added new partners over time. As a legal practitioner, Potter was noted more for his legal knowledge and administrative ability than for courtroom advocacy.

In May 1819, Potter was elected by the Massachusetts General Court to serve on the Executive Council of Massachusetts, taking office on June 3. Within a year, the District of Maine—where Potter resided—had been granted its independence from Massachusetts and was admitted as the 23rd U.S. state.

Under the new Constitution of Maine, elections were held in the spring of 1820, and Barrett was elected as one of three senators representing Cumberland County in the first two sessions of the Maine Senate. Potter did not run for re-election in 1822, and instead accepted an appointment as probate judge of Cumberland County. He served as probate judge for the remainder of his professional career, retiring in 1847.

== Personal life and family ==
Barrett Potter was the eldest of five children born to Reverend Isaiah Butler Potter (1746–1817) and his wife Elizabeth (née Barrett; 1758–1831). Reverend Potter—an Orthodox Congregationalist minister—was the first settled minister in Lebanon, New Hampshire, but took leave from his duties as pastor of the First Congregational Church to serve as a chaplain in the Continental Army during the American Revolutionary War.

Barrett Potter's younger brother, John Potter (1787–1865), was a prominent lawyer in Augusta, Maine, for 55 years; he served more than a decade as town selectman and represented Kennebec County for two terms in the Maine House of Representatives. John Potter's eldest son was John Fox Potter (1817–1899), who represented southeast Wisconsin for three terms in the U.S. House of Representatives (1857–1863). John Fox Potter was nicknamed "Bowie Knife Potter" after he demanded to use the bowie knife as his weapon when he was challenged to a duel in 1860 by Virginia U.S. representative Roger A. Pryor; the duel never ultimately took place, but the affair was widely covered by political newspapers around the country, turning Potter into an abolitionist celebrity for standing up to southern threats.

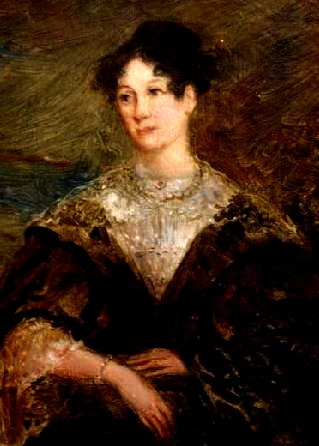
Potter's daughter, Mary Storer Potter (Longfellow), 1833

The Potter family were descendants of William Potter (1608–1662), who emigrated to the New Haven Colony in the company of Theophilus Eaton in 1637.

Barrett Potter married Anne Storer on July 13, 1809. They had six children together, but only three survived to adulthood. Anne died in 1821.

Their second-born daughter Mary Storer Potter (1812–1835) was a childhood love and the first wife of the poet Henry Wadsworth Longfellow. They married in 1831, but she suffered a miscarriage and died of complications in 1835.
