= Daniel Wells Jr. =

American politician

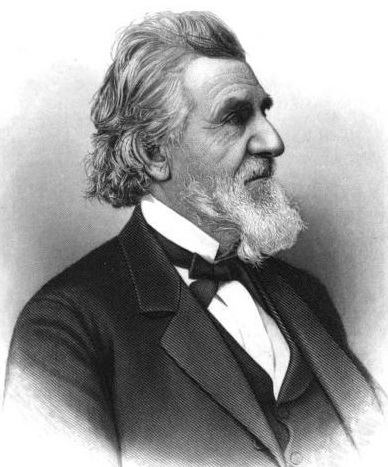

Member of the U.S. House of Representatives from Wisconsin's 1st district
- In office March 4, 1853 – March 3, 1857
- Preceded by: Charles Durkee
- Succeeded by: John F. Potter

Member of the Council of the Wisconsin Territory for Milwaukee & Washington counties
- In office November 5, 1838 – November 2, 1840 Serving with William A. Prentiss
- Preceded by: Alanson Sweet & Gilbert Knapp
- Succeeded by: Jonathan E. Arnold & Don A. J. Upham

Personal details
- Born: July 16, 1808 West Waterville, Massachusetts, U.S.
- Died: March 18, 1902 (aged 93) Milwaukee, Wisconsin, U.S.
- Resting place: Forest Home Cemetery, Milwaukee
- Party: Democratic; Whig (before 1848)
- Spouse: Marcia Bryant (m. 1831; died 1883)
- Children: Fannie Kimball (Norris); (b. 1852; died 1937)

Daniel Wells Jr. (July 16, 1808 – March 18, 1902) was an American businessman, Democratic politician, and Wisconsin pioneer. He was a major contributor to the early economic development of the city of Milwaukee, and was critical to the establishment of the Milwaukee–St. Paul Railroad. He was the wealthiest man in Wisconsin at the time of his death; he is the namesake of the Wells Building and Wells Street in Milwaukee.

He served two terms in the U.S. House of Representatives (1853–1857), representing southeast Wisconsin. Before Wisconsin's statehood, he served two years on the Council of the Wisconsin Territory (upper legislative chamber; 1838–1840).

== Early life ==
Daniel Wells Jr. was born in 1808, into a modestly wealthy family in West Waterville, Massachusetts (now Oakland, Maine). As a child, he worked at his father's farm and cloth mill, and attended public school during the winter seasons. After completing his primary education, he began teaching school in the area. During those years, he also devoted his personal time to the study of surveying and navigation.

At age 22, in 1830, he invested his savings in a supply of apples, cider, butter, cheese, dry goods, and other groceries, and traveled to the colony of Magnolia, Florida, to sell his stock. He then traveled to Tallahassee, where he met Robert B. Kerr, a tutor in the household of Robert Butler, the surveyor general of the Florida Territory. Kerr had been offered a contract by Butler to conduct a survey of government land in eastern Florida, but did not have funds to carry out the expedition. Wells chose to invest the profits from his grocery sales into Kerr's expedition, and was taken on as a partner to Kerr. The expedition began in December 1830 and completed three months later. Wells earned a significant profit from the job, and proved himself a proficient surveyor, but became severely ill for several months after.

In 1831, he returned with his profits to New England, purchasing a stock of goods in Boston, and then settling and opening a store in the city of Palmyra, Maine. During his four years in Palmyra, Wells attained his first public offices, serving as justice of the peace, selectman, town clerk, town assessor, and overseer of the poor.

== Milwaukee pioneer ==
During his years in Palmyra, Wells became impressed with the prospects opening up in the new territories in the west. Wells made his first trip to what would soon become the Wisconsin Territory in 1835. He traveled with a business partner, Winthrop Watson Gilman, with whom he pooled his money to make extensive land purchases in the new territory. Gilman, however, did not remain in Wisconsin, immediately traveling to Chicago and then back to Maine. Among his first purchases, Wells acquired two lots from Solomon Juneau, one of the founding settlers of Milwaukee—believed to be the first land contract ever made in Milwaukee. His original lots include what is now the site of the Milwaukee Club. Although his first purchases were from Juneau, the bulk of Wells' Milwaukee property was in the area known as Kilbourntown, the settlement established by Byron Kilbourn. Kilbourn would become a key business ally in Wells' later railroad enterprises.

During this first visit, Wells traveled about the eastern Wisconsin Territory, studying the land along the rough, then-heavily forested route between Milwaukee and Green Bay. At Green Bay, he attended a government land auction in August 1835, purchasing the rights to several tracts. Along his trip, Wells carried more than $7000 cash (about $260,000 adjusted for inflation) which he also used to make additional land purchases from smaller private land owners—at the time of his death, obituaries speculated that his hoard of cash represented more than half of all the hard money in the territory in 1835. His land purchases were largely concentrated in the vicinity of Manitowoc and Milwaukee.

Wells settled permanently in Milwaukee in 1836, traveling with his wife from Maine and arriving back in Milwaukee on May 19. His large land holdings enabled him to become a major real estate dealer for new settlers. In 1844, he also established the first brick hotel in the city—known originally as the City Hotel, it was later known as the Kirby House. He became invested in large scale shipping and storage of farm products, first in partnership with Talbot Dousman, and later with Horatio Hill. During these years he also invested extensively in the Wisconsin lumber industry—he forged lasting partnerships with Harrison Ludington and Isaac Stephenson in what became a vast lumber empire across the northern part of the state.

In the summer after his arrival in Milwaukee, he was appointed justice of the peace by then-governor Henry Dodge—believed to be the first gubernatorial appointment after the legal establishment of the Wisconsin Territory. During his first year as a resident, he worked to provide a more thorough survey of Milwaukee and the immediate surrounding area, making himself useful to his neighbors in defining the boundaries and shape of their lands. During 1836, he conducted the first survey and plat of lots on Milwaukee's south side. In the spring of 1837, he was elected to the executive committee of the "Claim Organization"—an entity set up to protect the rights of many Wisconsin property owners which were then legally considered "squatters", as they had purchased land but did not yet obtain title to it from the federal government. This role made him quite popular and influential with many of the early landowners in Wisconsin.

In 1838, he was elected trustee for the east side of the town of Milwaukee; that fall, he was also appointed probate judge for Milwaukee County. During the next several years he served a number of other local offices, including county supervisor, town surveyor, under-sheriff, and commissioner of bankruptcy; he also became one of the city's first fire wardens in 1841.

In the fall of 1838, he was also elected to represent Milwaukee County on the Council of the Wisconsin Territory (the upper chamber of the territory government). He served alongside William A. Prentiss, their district contained all of the territory that now comprises the counties of Milwaukee, Washington, Waukesha, Ozaukee, and Jefferson. This term was the first session held at the new capital city of Madison, and Wells was highly active throughout the term. He focused significantly on directing public investment into infrastructure for Milwaukee, and securing rights to benefit the settlers there. He sought to ensure that taxation was structured to protect settlers and penalize non-resident land speculators—laying taxation based on lot, but exempting from taxation any improvements built on the land. He also secured passage of a charter for the Wisconsin Marine and Fire Insurance Company, a difficult task in the territory which was, at the time, quite hostile to banks and bank-like institutions. Although his term was for four years, he served only two years, resigning at the end of the 2nd Wisconsin Territorial Assembly (1838–1840).

In 1851, he served as a commissioner from Wisconsin to the Great Exhibition in London, traveling extensively around England, Scotland, Ireland, and France. He did not return to Wisconsin until March 1852.

== U.S. House ==
Wisconsin's 1st congressional district 1849–1861

Throughout his early life, Wells identified with the Whig Party, and was elected on the Whig ticket to his term in the Wisconsin Territory government. His party affiliation began to shift around the complicated politics of 1848, and afterward he largely identified with the Democratic Party.

In 1852, Wells indicated his interest in running for U.S. House of Representatives on the Democratic ticket. He quickly secured party support in Milwaukee County, and was nominated by the Democratic congressional district convention in September. In the general election, Wells defeated the incumbent Free Soil candidate Charles Durkee and Whig nominee Henry S. Durand. In the 33rd Congress, he was appointed chairman of the House Committee on Expenditures in the Department of State.

During his first term, Wells was instrumental in securing grants of federal land for Wisconsin to be used for railroad construction connecting the east and west of the state. He also clashed with Secretary of War Jefferson Davis over his attempts to link the new Pacific coast states and territories to the rest of the country via a southern railroad route (many in the north considered this an attempt to export slavery to the new west; but it also represented an economic threat to the new northwestern states, like Wisconsin). He split with his party to vote against the pivotal Kansas–Nebraska Act, which would set the country on the road to civil war.

He ran for re-election in 1854, defeating Republican candidate Wyman Spooner. The 1854 election resulted in no party holding a majority in the House in the 34th Congress, and thus a long battle ensued over the election of a speaker. In February 1856, Wells secured the votes of twelve Democrats—including himself—to pass a temporary rule change to allow the election of a speaker by plurality. The rule change enabled the opposition to elect Nathaniel P. Banks as speaker. The new leadership of the House being indebted to Wells, they rewarded him with substantial land grants for railroad construction in Minnesota.

== Business career ==
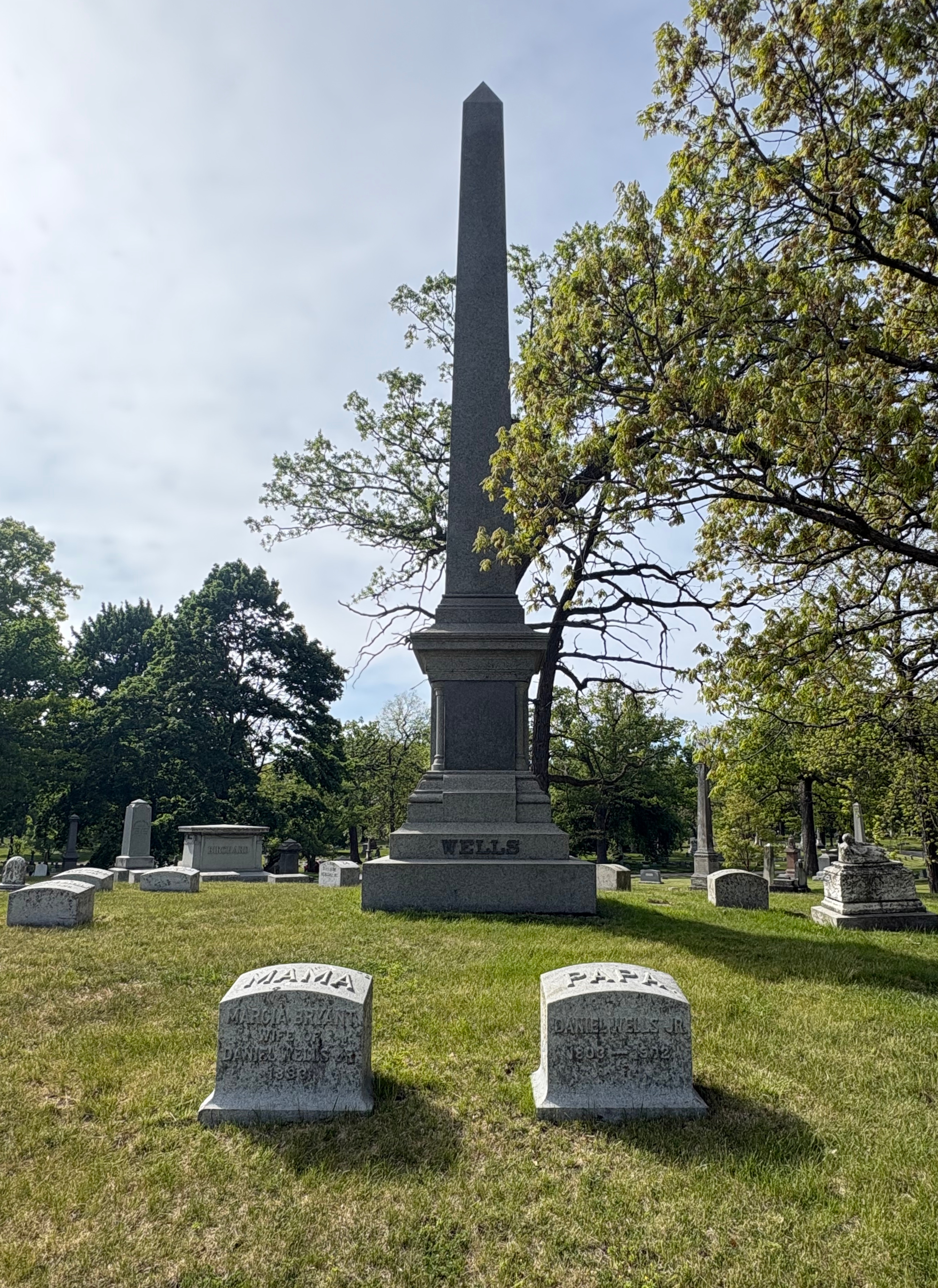
Wells's grave at Forest Home Cemetery

Wells did not run for re-election in 1856, and instead devoted himself fully to his railroad and business interests. With the Minnesota land grants, Wells established the Southern Minnesota Railroad Company with a number of other investors.

During 1857 and 1858, Wells was also caught up in the massive corruption investigation of the La Crosse and Milwaukee Railroad, in which dozens of Wisconsin state legislators and other officials received railroad bonds as bribes to secure railroad land grants; Wells was listed as having received about $10,000 of bonds (about $400,000 adjusted for inflation) and testified to the Legislative investigative committee, but was never charged with any actual wrongdoing. During the corruption scandal, the railroad was undergoing a corporate reorganization due to the panic of 1857, and Wells emerged as an officer in the reorganized company.

During these years, Wells was also expanding his interest in financial institutions, particularly banks in the northern and western parts of the state where his railroads would connect frontier lumbering operations to the other population centers. He also became a major shareholder in the insurance company that would become Northwestern Mutual Insurance Company.

Wells never retired from his business pursuits, and continued working up until his death at age 93. One of his last business endeavors was the construction of the Wells Building, which still stands at the intersection of North Milwaukee St. and East Wisconsin Ave. At the time of its construction, it was described as the biggest terracotta structure ever erected. He visited the building almost daily in his final years, making his last visit just three days before his death.

Wells died of old age at his home in Milwaukee on the evening of March 18, 1902. At the time of his death, he was widely described as the richest man in Wisconsin, having a fortune estimated between $15 million and $20 million ($560 million to $750 million adjusted for inflation). His remains were interred at Milwaukee's historic Forest Home Cemetery.

== Personal life and family ==
Daniel Wells Jr. was the sixth of eleven children (5th of 9 surviving children) born to Daniel Wells Sr. (1774–1867) and his wife Susanna (née Sweetser; 1780–1820). Daniel Wells Sr. was a farmer and clothing mill owner.

Daniel's younger brothers, Charles K. Wells (1817–1892) and William S. Wells (1820–1895) followed him to Wisconsin. William was a partner in a clothing mill, and Charles became a prominent attorney.

The Wells family were descendants of Thomas Wells (d. 1666), who emigrated from England to the Massachusetts Bay Colony in 1635. Daniel Jr.'s great-grandfather was Deacon Nathaniel Wells (1705–1776), the founder and namesake of Wells, Maine.

On November 23, 1831, Daniel Wells Jr. married Marcia Bryant, at Palmyra. Marcia was the daughter of Dr. Bezer Bryant. They had no biological children, but adopted a daughter; Marcia died in 1883. Their daughter, Fannie (1852–1937), married Milwaukee businessman Charles Wilkins Norris (1849–1916); Fannie's son Daniel Wells "Neill" Norris (1886–1948) founded the Norris Foundation of Mukwonago.

== Electoral history ==
Year	Election	Date	Elected				Defeated				Total	Plurality
1852	General	Nov. 8	Daniel Wells Jr.	Democratic	8,342	46.48%	Charles Durkee (inc)	F.S.	5,731	31.93%	17,946	2,611
1852	General	Nov. 8	Daniel Wells Jr.	Democratic	8,342	46.48%	Henry S. Durand	Whig	3,870	21.56%	17,946	2,611
1854	General	Nov. 6	Daniel Wells Jr. (inc)	Democratic	8,458	54.60%	Wyman Spooner	Rep.	7,026	45.35%	15,492	1,432

U.S. House of Representatives
Preceded by Charles Durkee	Member of the U.S. House of Representatives from Wisconsin's 1st congressional district March 4, 1853 – March 3, 1857	Succeeded by John F. Potter
