= 1861 United States Senate election in Wisconsin =

- January 23, 1861
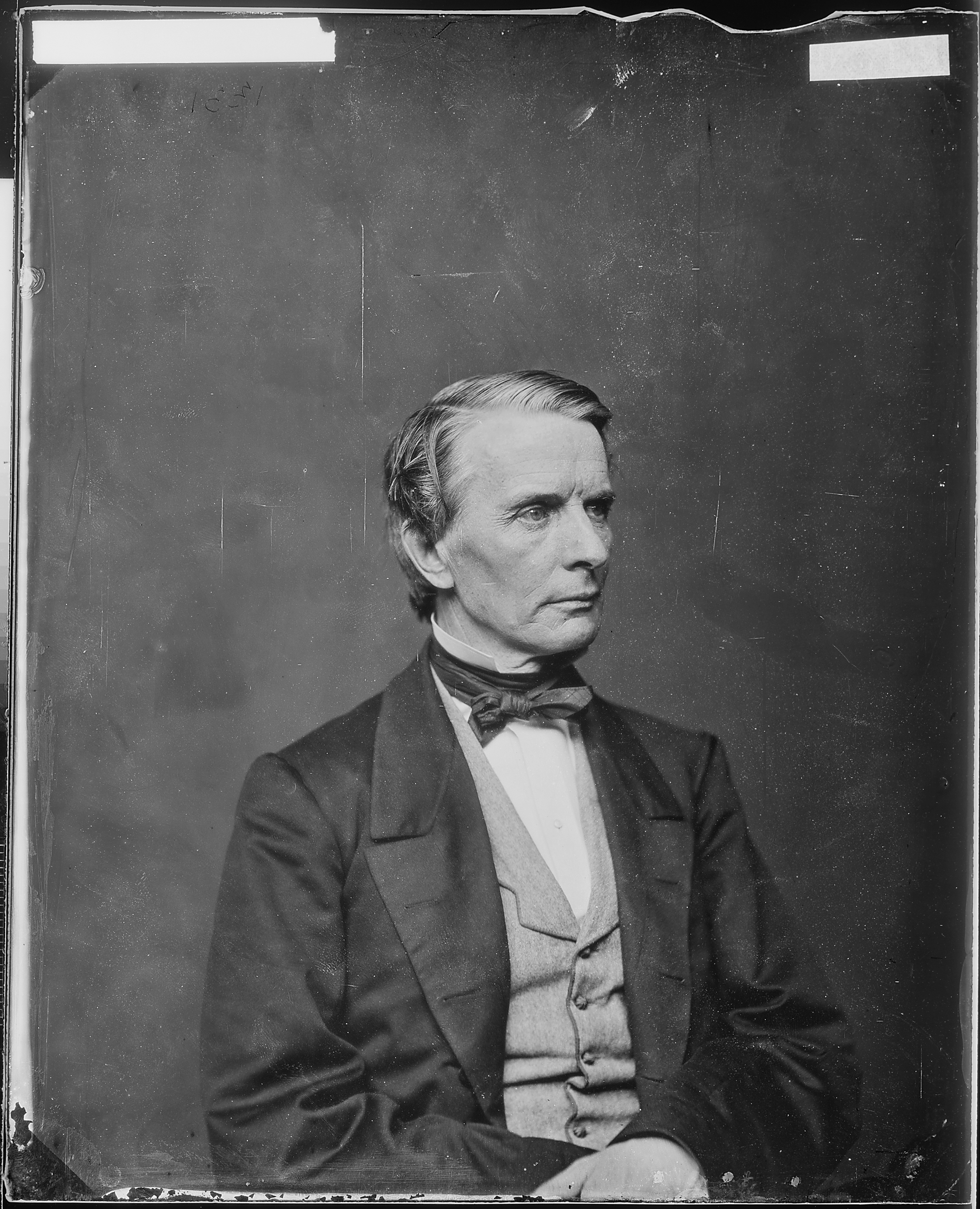

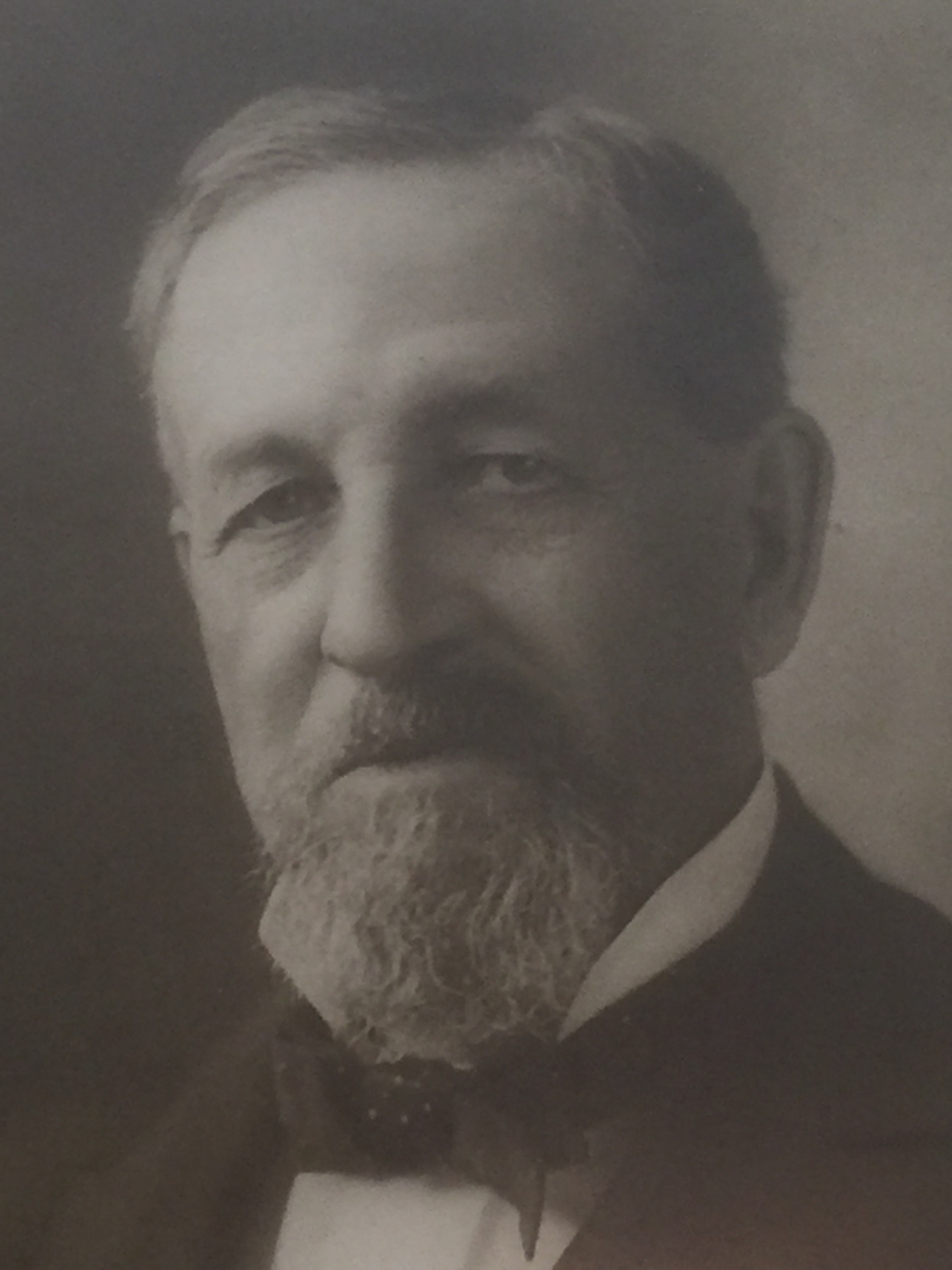
| Nominee | Timothy O. Howe | Henry L. Palmer |
| Party | Republican | Democratic |
| Legislative vote | 92 | 34 |
| Percentage | 73.02% | 26.98% |
U.S. senator before election
Charles Durkee
Republican
Elected U.S. Senator
Timothy O. Howe
Republican

The 1861 United States Senate election in Wisconsin was held in the 14th Wisconsin Legislature on January 23, 1861. Incumbent Republican U.S. senator Charles Durkee did not run for re-election. Former Wisconsin circuit court judge Timothy O. Howe was elected United States senator on the first ballot.

At the start of the 1861 term, Republicans held large majorities in both chambers of the Wisconsin Legislature, so had more than enough votes to elect a Republican United States senator. The main drama of the election was in the Republican legislative caucuses as they parsed through Republican candidates and selected the former judge, Timothy Howe, as their nominee. Howe had previously sought the party's nomination for U.S. Senate in the 1857 election, but lost out to James Rood Doolittle.

== Major candidates ==
=== Democratic ===
- Henry L. Palmer, former state representative from Milwaukee

=== Republican ===
- Timothy O. Howe, former Wisconsin circuit court judge from Green Bay
- Alexander Randall, incumbent governor of Wisconsin
- Cadwallader C. Washburn, outgoing U.S. representative from Wisconsin's 2nd congressional district

== Results ==
=== Republican nomination ===
Eighty-nine of the 92 Republican state senators and representatives met in a joint caucus on January 18, 1861, with three candidates seeking the nomination. Support for the three candidates was fairly even and unchanging over the first five ballots taken, with Washburn consistently leading in the mid-30s, but remaining stranded roughly 10 votes short of a majority. The caucus took a break but reconvened later that evening, Howe's total gradually crept up to the high 20s as Randall faded to the low 20s.

The caucus then adjourned for the weekend and reconvened on the morning of Wednesday, January 23, 1861. On the ninth ballot, Randall's supporters went over to Howe and secured his nomination, by a vote of 52 to 36, with 3 abstentions.

=== Official vote ===
1st Vote of the 14th Wisconsin Legislature, January 23, 1861
| Party | Candidate | Votes | % | ±% |
|---|---|---|---|---|
| Republican | Timothy O. Howe | 92 | 73.02% | |
| Democratic | Henry L. Palmer | 34 | 26.98% | |
| | Absent or not voting | 1 | | |
| Majority | | 64 | 50.39% | |
| Total votes | | 127 | 100.0% | |
| Republican hold | | | | |
