= Experience Estabrook =

American attorney (1813–1894)

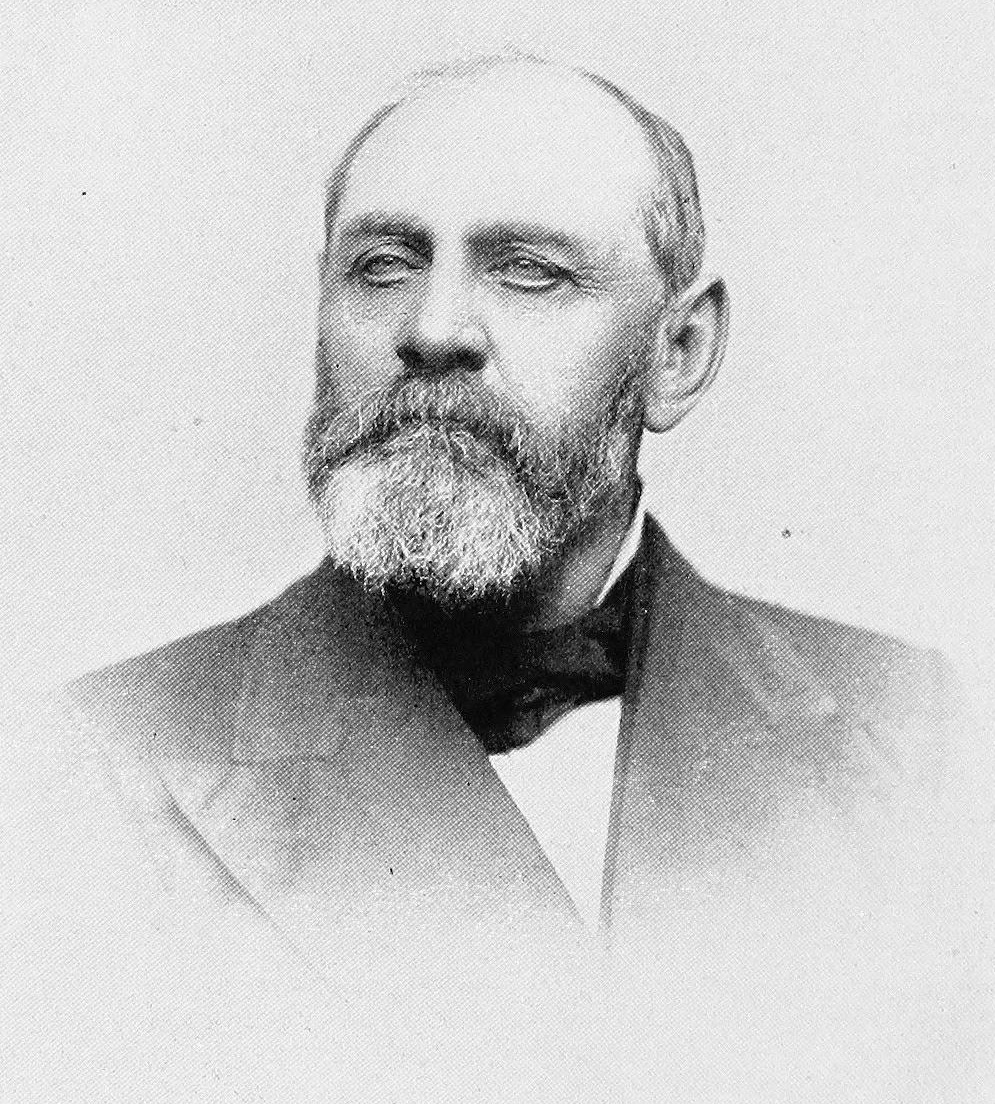

Delegate to the U.S. House of Representatives from the Nebraska Territory's at-large district
- In office March 4, 1859 – May 18, 1860
- Preceded by: Fenner Ferguson
- Succeeded by: Samuel Daily

United States Attorney for the Nebraska Territory
- In office 1854–1859
- President: Franklin Pierce; James Buchanan
- Preceded by: Position established
- Succeeded by: Leavitt Bowen

3rd Attorney General of Wisconsin
- In office January 5, 1852 – January 2, 1854
- Governor: Leonard J. Farwell
- Preceded by: S. Park Coon
- Succeeded by: George Smith

Member of the Wisconsin State Assembly from the Walworth 2nd district
- In office January 1, 1851 – January 1, 1852
- Preceded by: Rufus Cheney
- Succeeded by: Zerah Mead

Personal details
- Born: April 30, 1813 Lebanon, New Hampshire, U.S.
- Died: March 26, 1894 (aged 80) Omaha, Nebraska, U.S.
- Resting place: Forest Lawn Memorial Park
- Party: Democratic
- Spouse: Caroline Maxwell
- Children: 2, including Caroline Estabrook
- Education: Dickinson College; Chambersburg Law School (LLB)

Experience Estabrook (April 30, 1813 – March 26, 1894) was an American attorney and legal administrator. He was the third attorney general of Wisconsin and the first United States attorney for the Nebraska Territory.

== Biography ==
Born in Lebanon, New Hampshire, Estabrook moved with his parents to Clarence, New York, in 1822 where he attended the public schools. He then attended Dickinson College in Carlisle, Pennsylvania. He graduated from Chambersburg, Pennsylvania Law School, and then was admitted to the bar in Brooklyn, New York in 1839.

He worked as a clerk at the Navy Yard in Brooklyn and later practiced law in Buffalo, New York.

In 1840, he moved to Geneva, Wisconsin in 1840 and continued the practice of law.

Estabrook was a delegate to the second Wisconsin State Constitutional Convention in 1848; in 1851, he became a member of the Wisconsin State Assembly. He was attorney general of Wisconsin in 1852 and 1853.

Estabrook was appointed as United States attorney by President Franklin Pierce, for the Nebraska Territory, and served from 1854 to 1859.

He ran for delegate to the Thirty-sixth United States Congress, and won by 300 votes, but his opponent Samuel G. Daily contested the election and won. The House Committee on Elections found many cases of fraud and voter irregularities, ranging from improperly commissioned election officials to the vote total from Izard County exceeding the county's population. Estabrook served from March 4, 1859, to May 18, 1860, when he was removed and replaced by Samuel G. Daily. Estabrook was appointed by the governor to codify the Nebraska State laws in 1866.

He became the prosecuting attorney for Douglas County, Nebraska in 1867 and 1868. He was a member of the Nebraska State Constitutional Convention in 1871.

Estabrook died in Omaha, Nebraska, and was buried in Forest Lawn Cemetery in Omaha.

His daughter, Caroline, was a composer. His son, Henry Dodge Estabrook, was a lawyer in New York City.

Party political offices
Preceded by S. Park Coon	Democratic nominee for Attorney General of Wisconsin; 1851	Succeeded by George Smith
U.S. House of Representatives
Preceded by Fenner Ferguson	Delegate to the U.S. House of Representatives from the Nebraska Territory's at-large congressional district 1859–1860	Succeeded by Samuel Daily
Legal offices
Preceded by S. Park Coon	Attorney General of Wisconsin; 1852–1854	Succeeded by George Smith
New office	United States Attorney for the Nebraska Territory; 1854–1859	Succeeded by Leavitt Bowen
