= Adam E. Ray =

American politician

Adam E. Ray (1808 - September 20, 1865) was an American farmer politician from Troy, Wisconsin who served several terms in the Legislature of Wisconsin Territory, and a single term in 1851 as a Free Soil Party member of the Wisconsin State Assembly from Walworth County.

== Background ==
Ray was the son of Martin Ray and Caroline Phelps Ray, born in Kingston, New York in 1808. (His brother George Augustus Ray, who would also serve in the legislature, was born in 1819). Adam Ray came to Milwaukee in Wisconsin Territory around 1837, and represented Milwaukee and Washington counties in the territorial Legislature; lower house from 1839 to 1842; upper house in 1845.

About 1846 he settled in Troy with his wife, Eliza. They would have children: Patrick Henry, Eliza, Mary, Augusta, Jane, Fred, Ira, and Ida. Patrick Henry Ray would retire as a brigadier general; the Ray Mountains and Ray River in Alaska are named after him.

== Public office ==
In 1847, Ray was chairman of Troy's town board and a member of the county's Board of Supervisors.

In 1850, he was elected to the Assembly as a Free Soiler for the 1851 session, succeeding Whig Alexander O. Babcock. He was succeeded in 1852 by fellow Free Soiler Stephen Steele Barlow.

== Agriculture and beyond ==
In 1851 Ray was a member of the executive committee of the newly organized Wisconsin State Agricultural Society. He served as a judge in two categories of the first Wisconsin State Fair: Merinoes, and flour and corn meal; and took several prizes in farm implements: best hay fork, manure fork, grass scythe, grain scythe, and hay knife.

He is also reported as keeping a tavern in Little Prairie. In later years, he would be remembered in Little Prairie for giving or selling a lot for the Methodist church in 1858; a field for a cemetery in 1860; and a lot for the Bible Christian church in 1861.

== After the Assembly ==
Ray served as a member and Chairman of the Walworth County board of supervisors in 1856 and 1857.

About 1858 Ray went to Alabama, planning "to try northern ways of farming there". The political conflicts he encountered on the eve of the American Civil War, led him to return to Wisconsin before the outbreak of the war. He soon afterward moved to Waukesha, where he died on September 20, 1865.
