= Syria–Taiwan relations =

- Syria: Taiwan

Syria–Taiwan relations are the bilateral relations between Syria and Taiwan. The two states currently do not have official diplomatic relations and do not have diplomatic missions at each other's capitals, as Syria considers Taiwan to be a part of the People's Republic of China. Taiwan handles Syrian affairs through the Taipei Economic and Cultural Office in Jordan.

== History ==
Voting record of the UN during Resolution 2758 in 1971, which removed the membership of the Republic of China in exchange for the admission of the People's Republic of China. Syria voted in favor of this resolution.

In 1949, following the ROC retreat to Taiwan, Syria and Taiwan had few relations due to geopolitical factors in the Cold War.

On 25 October 1971, the UN General Assembly voted on Resolution 2758 to decide on Taiwan's status in the UN. This resolution sought to replace the membership of Republic of China with People's Republic of China, and was proposed by 23 countries, including Syria. This resolution eventually passed and the ROC has not been a part of the UN since.

On 14 April 2018, the US, UK, and France conducted joint strikes against the Syrian government during the Syrian civil war following the Douma chemical attack. In response, the Taiwanese foreign ministry condemned the use of chemical weapons by any government against civilians, and supported International sanctions against Syria to address this issue.

In November 2025, while visiting China, Syrian Foreign Minister Asaad al-Shaibani that the Syrian transitional government continued to adhere to one China, recognizing the People's Republic of China as the sole legitimate government representing China, including Taiwan.

== Trade relations ==
Prior to the Syrian civil war, the Taiwan External Trade Development Council (TAITRA) invited members of various industries to participate in an exhibition in Syria with the goal of expanding economic cooperation between Taiwan and Syria. However, this has mostly subsided as a result of the civil war.

Recent bilateral trade volume (in USD)
Year	Trade volume			Taiwan→Syria			Syria→Taiwan		
Year	Amount	Annual change	Ranking	Amount	Annual change	Ranking	Amount	Annual change	Ranking
2017	33,202,376	▲31.7%	115	32,562,553	▲30.7%	95	639,823	▲106.3%	164
2018	41,857,241	▲26.1%	105	41,674,974	▲28.0%	92	182,267	▼71.5%	185
2019	43,271,686	▲3.4%	106	43,089,657	▲3.4%	88	182,029	▼0.1%	183
2020	24,116,172	▼44.3%	120	23,943,071	▼44.4%	103	173,101	▼4.9%	177
2021	10,483,320	▼56.5%	147	10,374,098	▼56.7%	124	109,222	▼36.9%	188
2022	4,858,454	▼53.7%	168	4,776,801	▼54.0%	151	81,653	▼25.2%	187
2023	6,043,801	▲24.4%	158	5,887,018	▲23.2%	137	156,783	▲92.0%	176
2024	4,971,020	▼17.8%	166	4,855,595	▼17.5%	144	115,425	▼26.4%	177

In 2023, the main trade products are as follows:

Taiwan → Syria: Cellulose and other chemical derivatives, rice, plastic and other final goods, polymers of styrene, synthetic fiber yarns and woven fabrics, tin bars, rods, profiles and wires, vehicle parts and accessories, new rubber tires, rubber or plastic processing machines or machinery for manufacturing products from such raw materials, hand tools, various pruning shears, sickles, and hay knives.

Syria → Taiwan: Soap, organic surfactants and their preparations, live animals, fresh wine and grape must, printing presses, printers, copiers and fax machines, cosmetic and skincare products, parts and accessories for motor vehicles, and small import declarations and other miscellaneous items not exceeding NT$50,000.

=== Investments ===
According to the Taiwanese Ministry of Economic Affairs, Taiwanese businesses do not have records of investment in Syria as of June 2023. Syrian investment in Taiwan includes 19 items and is valued at $1.31 million USD.

== Humanitarian aid ==
In 2016, the Taiwanese foreign ministry donated funds towards the establishment of the charity Taiwan - Reyhanli Centre for World Citizens. After the construction of a refugee center in 2020, the service is mostly towards the refugees of the Syrian civil war and local Turkish residents, and includes services in education, female entrepreneurship, and other social welfare programs.

On 6 February 2023, in response to earthquakes in Turkey and Syria, the Taiwanese government donated $5 million USD through Mercy Corps to assist Syrians affected by the earthquakes.

== See also ==
- Foreign relations of Syria
- Foreign relations of Taiwan
