= David Goodey =

David Richard Goodey
- Born: 22 June 1942; Reading, UK
- Died: 26 September 2011 (aged 69)
- Occupations: businessman, equestrian business owner
- Known for: horses and carriages for film and television

David Richard Goodey (22 June 1942 – 26 September 2011) was a businessman from Berkshire, England who became known for his success in running Riding stables and for providing Horses and Carriages for the film and television industry from the 1970s to the 1990s. Goodey was born in Reading and died at the age of 69 in Salisbury, Wiltshire.

== Early life and career ==
David Goodey was born in Reading, the son of Oliver Richard and Kathleen Stella (formerly Brill) Goodey. He was the nephew of Harold Benjamin Thomas and Eric Reginald Goodey from Twyford, Berkshire. The two Goodey brothers ran a company in Twyford specialising in collecting and selling antique vehicles. A public auction of over 500 items such as many Vintage cars, Traction engines and horse-drawn carriages took place at the Goodey yard in 1956.

After a youthful job working as a butcher's assistant, David Goodey decided to branch out in a different direction. His love of horses led him to set up a riding school on land in Earley, that now forms part of the main Whiteknights campus of the University of Reading.

== Horse and carriage business ==
In the early 1970s Goodey moved his business operation to land in Spencers Wood, 5 miles south of Reading. Here he began another phase of his career, procuring horses, carriages and equipment for the producers of feature films and television shows. The business, called Foxhill Riding Stables and Carriages Ltd, grew to such an extent that at one stage the stables housed over 160 horses and over 200 horse-drawn vehicles. His horses and period carriages were used in a variety of films and television programmes and for Weddings, Funerals, pageants and promotional work. In particular, Goodey's horses and carriages were deployed in the James Bond film Octopussy, the film Hamlet starring Mel Gibson and Glenn Close, the film The Madness of King George with Nigel Hawthorne in the title role, the British film Robin Hood and the Sherlock Holmes series, starring Jeremy Brett, made for British television. Goodey also acted as horse master for the film Princess Caraboo, and for the British television series By the Sword Divided.

== Later life ==
After retiring from his equestrian business career, Goodey moved to Salisbury, Wiltshire. After a brief spell in Burghfield Common, Berkshire, he moved back to Salisbury where he continued to own and remain close to his beloved dogs and horses.

== Donations ==
In 1963 and 1964 Goodey donated 26 items to The Museum of English Rural Life, in Reading, Berkshire. The objects were some of those used during his career working with horses and include a wooden shovel and a metal hay knife.
