= Jordan–Taiwan relations =

- Jordan: Taiwan

Jordan–Taiwan relations refers to bilateral relations between Jordan (officially the Hashemite Kingdom of Jordan) and Taiwan (officially the Republic of China).

== History ==
Formal diplomatic relations between the two began in 1955. George Yeh visited Jordan in 1957. Hussein of Jordan visited Taiwan in 1959.

Official diplomatic relations were paused after Jordan recognized the People's Republic of China on 1977 however Jordan opened the Jordanian Commercial Office in Taipei in 1978 to continue unofficial relations.

Lee Teng-hui visited Jordan in 1995. Lien Chan visited Jordan in 1998.

Princess Haya bint Hussein, Princess of Jordan, visited Taiwan in 2010 and met with Ma Ying-jeou. Haya assisted Taiwan in its bid to host the 2010 Federation Equestre Internationale (FEI) General Assembly.

Taiwan worked with Jordan to provide humanitarian assistance to refugees fleeing the Syrian Civil War.

== Commercial relations ==
In the 1980s, Jordan served as an important hub for Taiwanese businesses operating in the Middle East.

Taiwanese companies have invested into Jordan's textile sector. Cooperation has also occurred in the renewable energy field.

== Representation ==
=== Taipei Economic and Cultural Office in Jordan ===
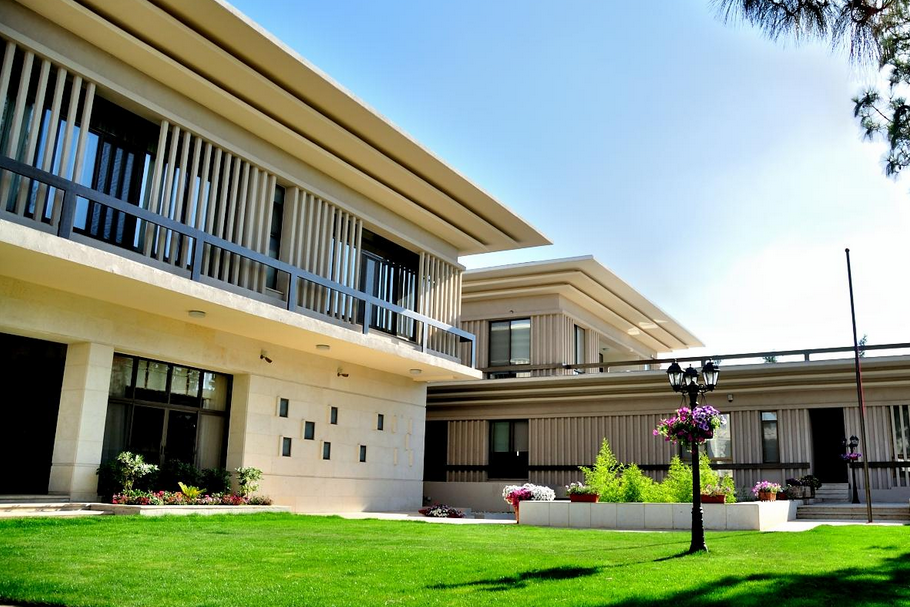

The Taipei Economic and Cultural Office in Jordan (Chinese: 駐約旦臺北經濟文化辦事處; pinyin: Zhù Yuēdàn Táiběi jīngjì wénhuà bànshì chǔ) represents the interests of Taiwan in the Hashemite Kingdom of Jordan in the absence of formal diplomatic relations, functioning as a de facto embassy. Its counterpart is the Jordanian Commercial Office in Taipei, which was established on 25 November 1977.

== See also ==
- Palestine–Taiwan relations
- T91 assault rifle
- Taiwan–Middle East relations
