= Joseph D. Bryant =

American physician

Joseph Decatur Bryant
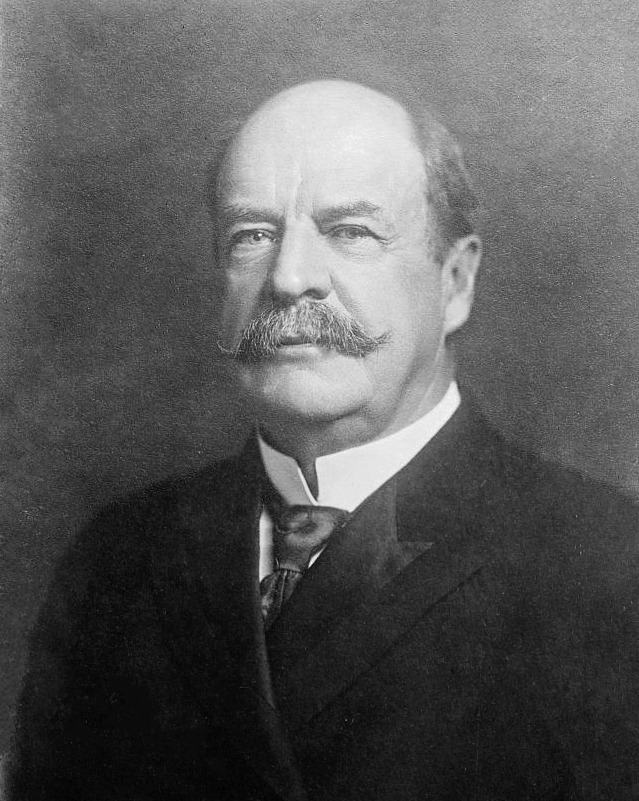
- Born: March 12, 1845; Troy, Wisconsin Territory
- Died: April 7, 1914 (aged 69); New York City, US
- Resting place: Norwich, New York
- Education: Bellevue Hospital Medical College (1868)
- Occupations: Surgeon, professor
- Spouse: Annette Amelia Crum
- Children: 1

Joseph Decatur Bryant (March 12, 1845 – April 7, 1914) was a surgeon, New York City Health Commissioner, Surgeon-General of the National Guard Surgeons, and physician to Grover Cleveland and John D. Rockefeller. He also held a series of academic positions at Bellevue Hospital Medical College, culminating with the title of professor of the principles and practice of surgery, and professor of operative and clinical surgery, at New York University and Bellevue Hospital Medical College.

== Early life and education ==
Joseph Decatur Bryant was born on a farm near Troy, Wisconsin Territory, on March 12, 1845, the only child of Alonzo Bryant and Harriet Adkins Bryant. He attended public school in Troy and when still a young boy, moved with his parents to the State of New York.

Bryant attended Norwich Academy and received his medical degree from Bellevue Hospital Medical College in 1868. He remained at Bellevue Hospital as an intern from 1869 to 1871, after which he became an assistant to the professor of anatomy at the Medical College. He lectured for several years on surgical anatomy before being appointed to the position of professor of general descriptive and surgical anatomy in 1877. In 1883 he was named professor of anatomy and clinical surgery, and associate professor of orthopedic surgery. In 1898 he became professor of the principles and practice of surgery, a position he would retain for the remainder of his teaching career. In 1908, he received the honorary degree of LL. D. from New York University.

== Career ==
In 1873 he was appointed as a sanitary inspector of the New York City Health Department, a position he held until 1879. In 1887 he was appointed by New York Mayor Abram Hewitt as one of the city's Health Commissioners, and in the same year he was also appointed a Commissioner of the New York State Board of Health. As a Health Commissioner, he worked to protect the city from the effects of unsanitary conditions of the sewage system of the day, and to reduce the effects of disease brought into the city by immigrants. Although his term as Health Commissioner did not expire until May 1893, he resigned from both positions in March 1893, stating that he wanted to allow his successor time to familiarize himself with the position before the summer, when the worst health problems surface.

Bryant joined the 71st Regiment of the New York National Guard in 1872, becoming a surgeon of the regiment with the rank of Major. In 1882 then-Governor of New York Grover Cleveland commissioned Bryant as Surgeon-General of the state. His private practice was reportedly one of the largest in New York, where he was an attending or visiting surgeon at a large number of hospitals in the city. He also remained an instructor at Bellevue Medical College until the time of his death. In 1894 Bryant was named president of the Association of Medical Officers of the National Guard and Naval Militia of the State of New York.

Bryant was a close personal friend of Grover Cleveland, often accompanying him on hunting and fishing excursions. He became Cleveland's personal physician in 1887, continuing in that role after Cleveland was elected president. In July 1893, Bryant secretly operated on Cleveland to remove a cancerous growth from the roof of his mouth. The operation took place during a purported vacation cruise on the Oneida off Long Island; such secrecy had been deemed necessary in order to avoid creating a greater financial panic in the country. The facts of the surgery were not released until 1917, after the death of both Cleveland and Bryant.

== Memberships ==
Bryant was a fellow of the American Surgical Association, and a member of the International Society of Surgeons. He was president of the New York Academy of Medicine (1895–1897), the New York State Medical Association (1899), and the American Medical Association (1907–08).

== Published works ==
Among his published works are the two-volume Manual of Operative Surgery (1884) and the eight-volume Bryant and Buck's American Practice of Surgery (1906–1911). He also authored many articles on surgical and anatomical subjects.

== Personal life ==
Bryant married Annette Amelia Crum, the daughter of Samuel Crum, on September 29, 1874. They had one daughter.

On March 11, 1914, Bryant was hospitalized with complications from diabetes. He died on April 7, 1914, and was buried in Norwich, New York.
