= Patrick Henry Ray =

United States Army general

Patrick Henry Ray (May 8, 1842 in Waukesha County, Wisconsin – 1911), was a brigadier general in the United States Army. His father, Adam E. Ray, was a member of the Wisconsin State Assembly. An uncle, George Augustus Ray, was also a member. On April 22, 1889, Ray married Ada Blackman.

== Career ==
After the outbreak of the American Civil War, Ray enlisted with the 2nd Wisconsin Volunteer Infantry Regiment of the Union Army. By war's end, he was a captain with the 1st Wisconsin Heavy Artillery Regiment.

In 1867, he received a new commission in the regular Army. He would later take part in the American Indian Wars.

In 1881, he established a meteorological and magnetic observation station at Barrow, Alaska. In 1885, the Ray River was named after him, and the Ray Mountains were in turn named after the River. During the Spanish–American War, Ray commanded the District of North Alaska. Afterwards, Ray would command Fort Snelling and what is now Fort William Henry Harrison. He was promoted to brigadier general in 1906.
