= Doc Adkins =

American baseball player (1872-1934)

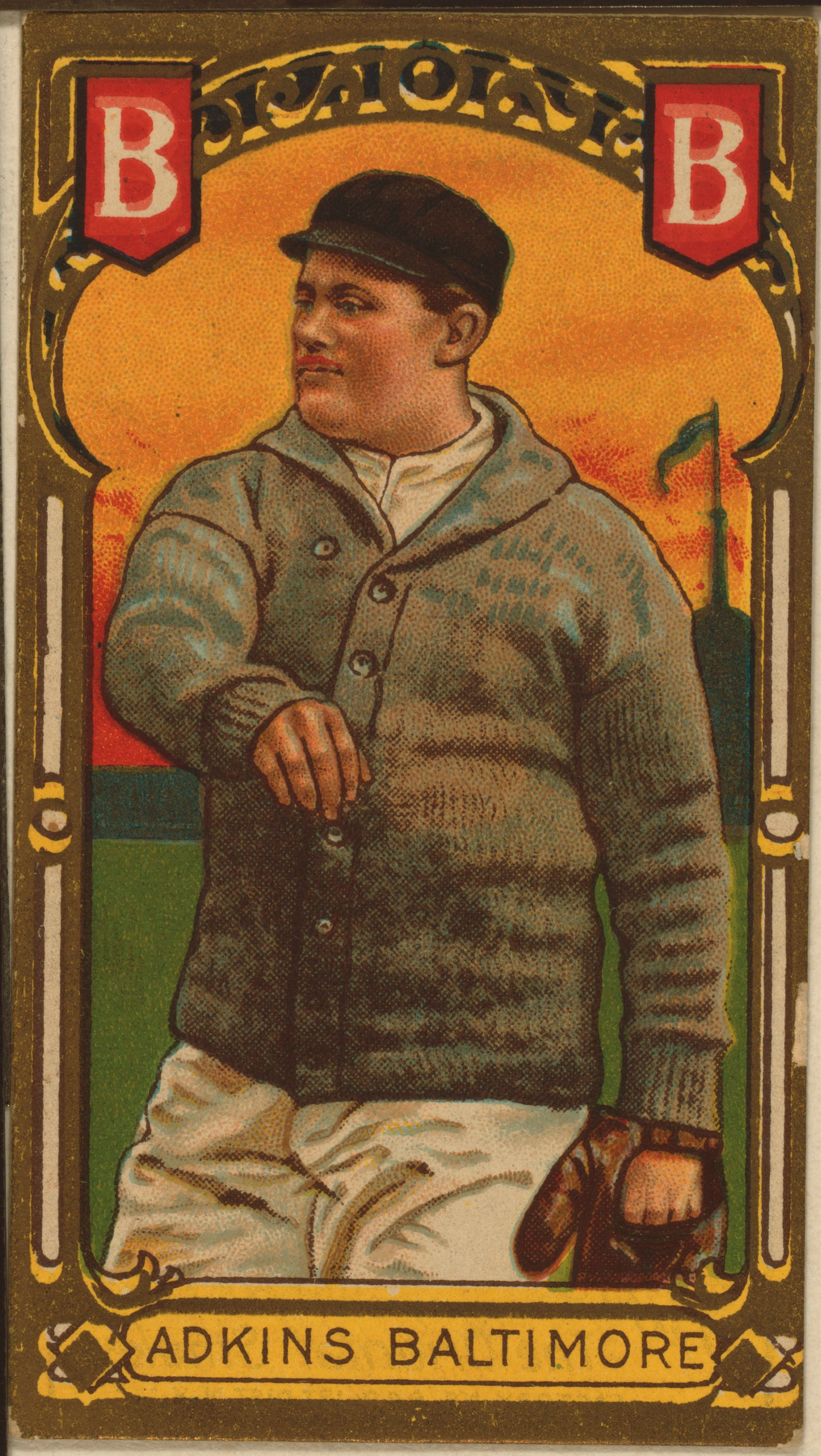
- Doc Adkins baseball card
- Pitcher
- Born: August 5, 1872; Troy, Wisconsin, U.S.
- Died: February 21, 1934 (aged 61); Durham, North Carolina, U.S.
- Batted: Right Threw: Right

MLB debut
- June 24, 1902, for the Boston Americans

Last MLB appearance
- September 29, 1903, for the New York Highlanders

MLB statistics
- Win–loss record: 1–1
- Earned run average: 5.00
- Strikeouts: 3
- Stats at Baseball Reference

Teams
- Boston Americans (1902); New York Highlanders (1903)

Merle Theron Adkins (August 5, 1872 – February 21, 1934) was an American pitcher in Major League Baseball who played for the Boston Americans (1902) and New York Highlanders (1903). Adkins batted and threw right-handed.

== Early life ==
Adkins was born in Troy, Wisconsin, and he attended Beloit College.

== Major league career ==
Adkins made his debut with the Boston Americans on June 24, 1902, during a 6–7 loss to the Washington Senators. He made four appearances (two starts) with Boston, posting a 1–1 record with an earned run average of 4.05, walking seven and striking out three in 20 innings pitched.

Adkins spent the 1903 season with the New York Highlanders, pitching in two games, one of which was a start. In seven innings of work, he let up eight runs, six of which were earned, on 10 hits and five walks with a 7.71 ERA. His final major League appearance came September 29, 1903 – the last day of the season – in a 10–4 win over the Detroit Tigers.

== Minor leagues ==
After his stint with the Highlanders, Adkins spent eight seasons with the Baltimore Orioles, winning 132 games in that time. He retired after one season with the Scranton Miners in 1914. Around the same time, he also coached baseball at Trinity College in Connecticut.

== Retirement ==
Adkins attended medical school during his playing career, and he spent his later life as a physician in Durham, North Carolina. He was also active as a youth baseball umpire, Rotarian, Shriner, and church deacon. Adkins also scouted players, notably discovering Ernie Shore and calling him to the attention of Jack Dunn, then the owner of the Baltimore Orioles.

Adkins died in Durham, aged 63. He is buried at Maplewood Cemetery.
