= Nathaniel M. Bunker =

American politician

Member of the Wisconsin State Assembly from the Walworth 3 district
- In office 1875

Personal details
- Born: Nathaniel Meade Bunker; August 31, 1817 Milan, New York
- Died: March 25, 1889 (aged 71)
- Party: Republican

Nathaniel Meade Bunker was a member of the Wisconsin State Assembly.

== Biography ==
Bunker was born on August 31, 1817, in Milan, New York. In 1885, he moved to Troy, Walworth County, Wisconsin. He died on March 25, 1889.

== Assembly career ==
Bunker was a member of the Assembly during the 1875 session. Previously, he had been an unsuccessful candidate in 1871. He was a Republican.
