= Little Prairie, Wisconsin =

- Unincorporated community
- Location within Wisconsin Location within the United States
- Coordinates: 42°50′20″N 88°32′20″W
- Country: United States
- State: Wisconsin
- County: Walworth
- Elevation: 955 ft (291 m)
- Time zone: UTC-6 (Central (CST))
  - Summer (DST): UTC-5 (CDT)
- Area code: 262
- GNIS feature ID: 1568373

Little Prairie is an unincorporated community located in the town of Troy, Walworth County, Wisconsin, United States.

== Notable people ==
- Adam E. Ray, Wisconsin state and territorial legislator and businessman, owned a tavern in Little Prairie.
