= George Augustus Ray =

American politician

George Augustus Ray (April 23, 1819 – February 23, 1893) was an American farmer and politician.

Born in Delaware County, New York, he moved to Mukwonago, Wisconsin Territory, in 1837. In 1860, Ray moved to the Town of La Grange, Walworth County, Wisconsin. He served on the Walworth County Board of Supervisors for La Grange. In 1868, Ray served in the Wisconsin State Assembly as a Republican. His brother, Adam E. Ray, also served in the Wisconsin Assembly. A nephew, Patrick Henry Ray, became a brigadier general in the United States Army. In 1870, Ray moved to Whitewater, Wisconsin, where he died in 1893.
