= List of diplomatic missions in Jordan =

This is a list of diplomatic missions in Jordan. At present, the capital of Amman hosts 71 embassies. Several other countries have ambassadors accredited from other regional capitals. Honorary consulates are excluded from this listing.

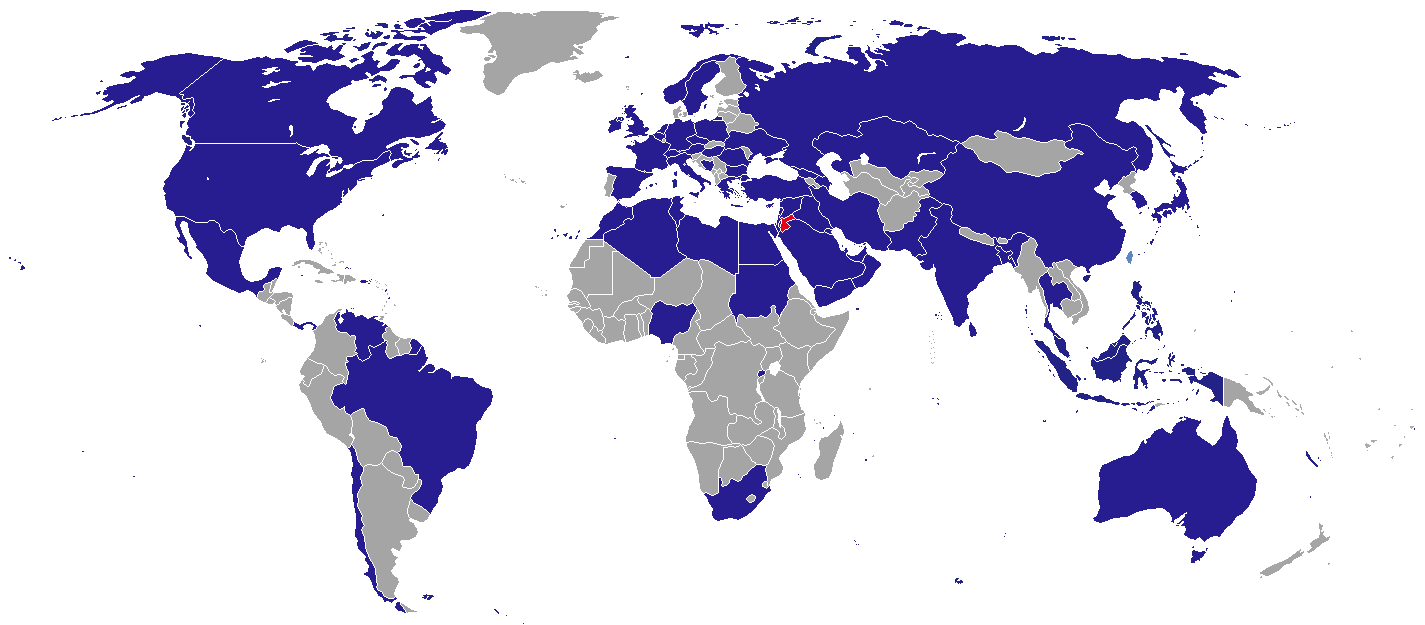
Map of diplomatic missions in Jordan

== Diplomatic missions in Amman ==
=== Embassies ===
1. Algeria
2. Antigua and Barbuda
3. Australia
4. Austria
5. Azerbaijan
6. Bahrain
7. Bangladesh
8. Belgium
9. Bosnia and Herzegovina
10. Brazil
11. Brunei
12. Bulgaria
13. Canada
14. Chile
15. China
16. Cyprus
17. Czech Republic
18. Egypt
19. France
20. Georgia
21. Germany
22. Greece
23. Holy See
24. Hungary
25. India
26. Indonesia
27. Iran
28. Iraq
29. Ireland
30. Israel
31. Italy
32. Japan
33. Kazakhstan
34. Kuwait
35. Lebanon
36. Libya
37. Malaysia
38. Mexico
39. Morocco
40. Netherlands
41. Nigeria
42. Norway
43. Oman
44. Pakistan
45. Palestine
46. Panama
47. Philippines
48. Poland
49. Qatar
50. Romania
51. Russia
52. Rwanda
53. Saudi Arabia
54. South Africa
55. South Korea
56. Sovereign Military Order of Malta
57. Spain
58. Sri Lanka
59. Sudan
60. Sweden
61. Switzerland
62. Syria
63. Thailand
64. Tunisia
65. Turkey
66. Ukraine
67. United Arab Emirates
68. United Kingdom
69. United States
70. Venezuela
71. Yemen

=== Other missions or delegations ===
1. Abkhazia (Representative Office)
2. European Union (Delegation)
3. Republic of China (Taiwan) (Economic & Cultural office)

== Gallery ==
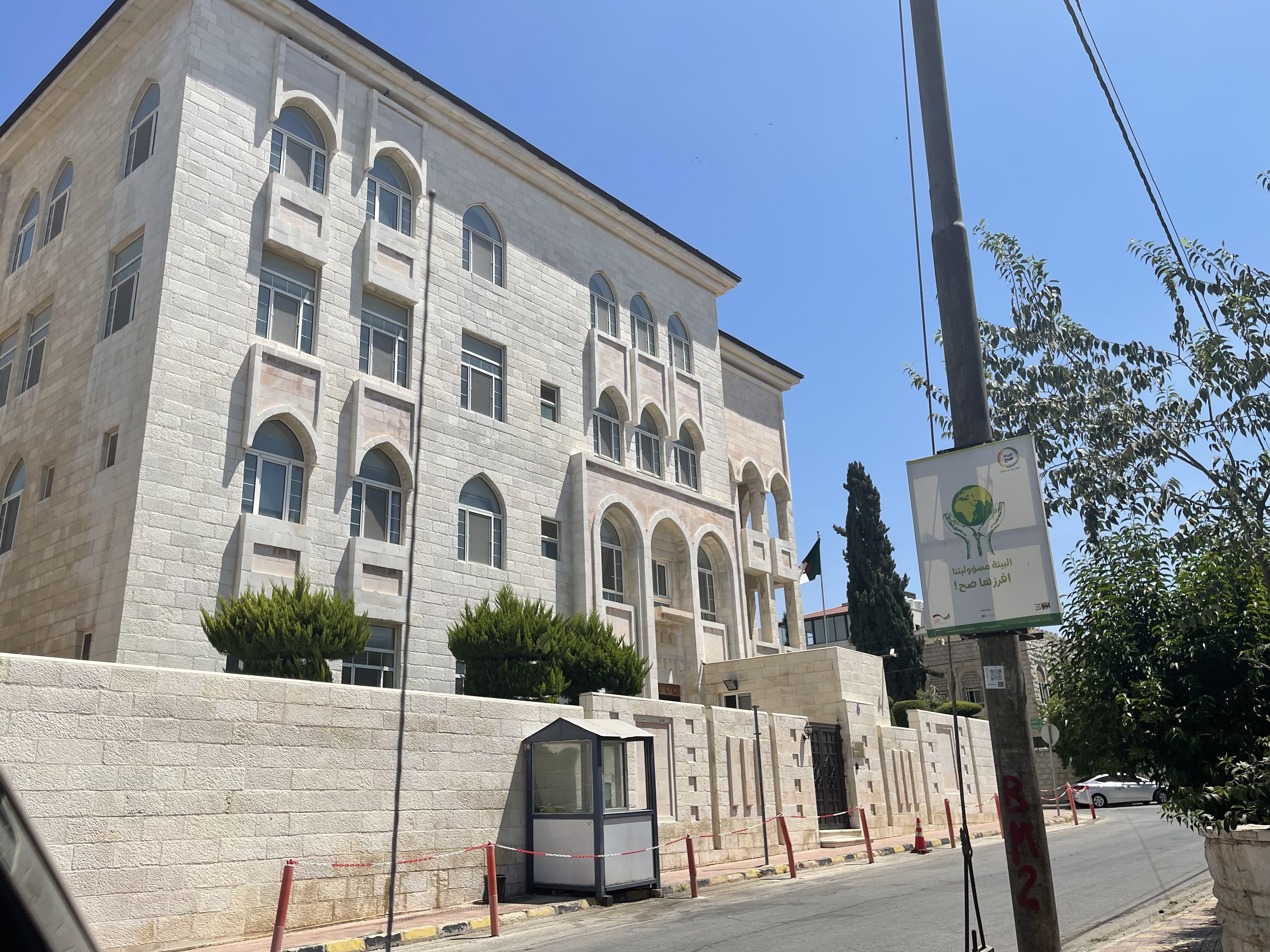
Embassy of Algeria

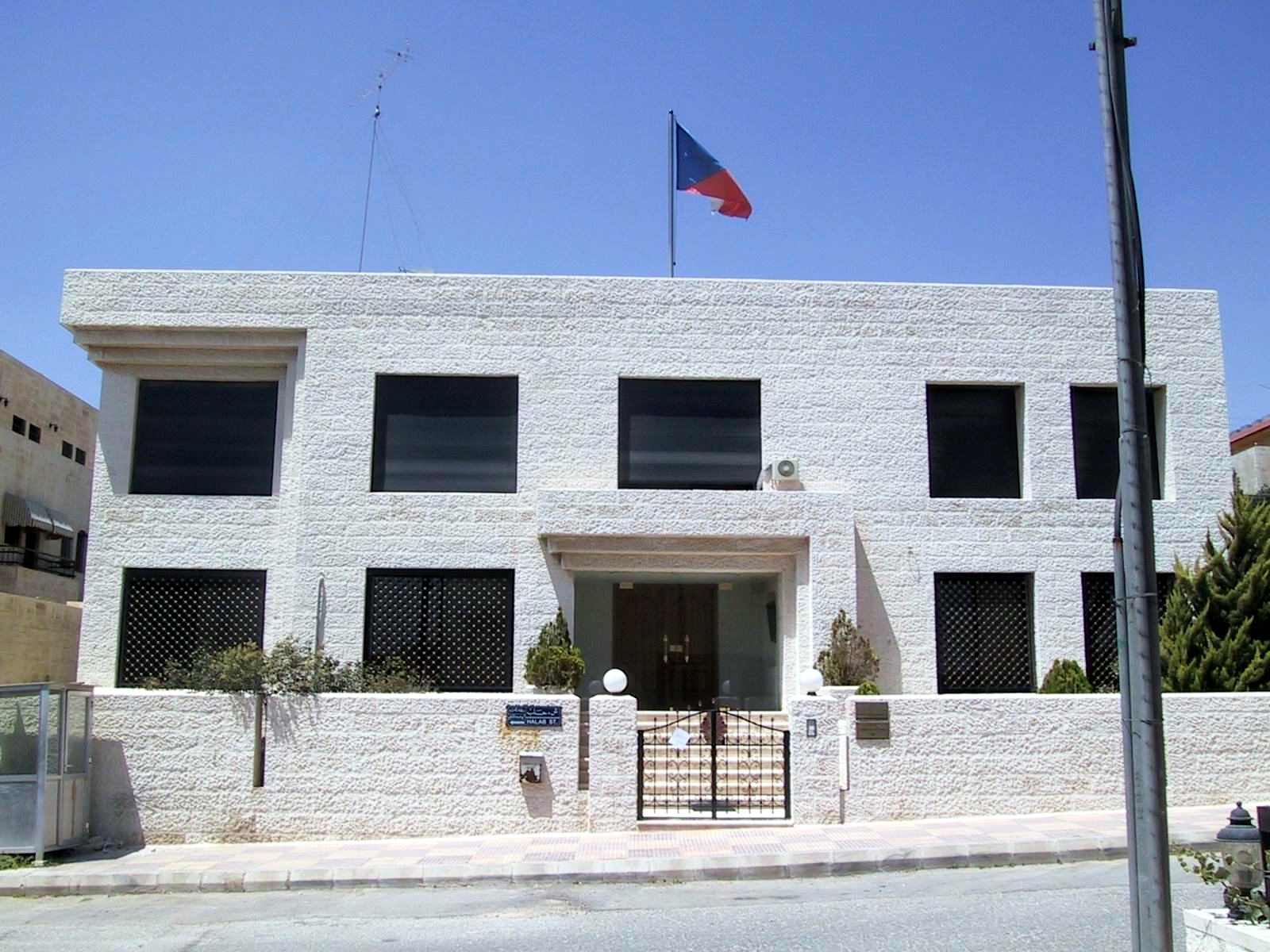
Embassy of the Czech Republic

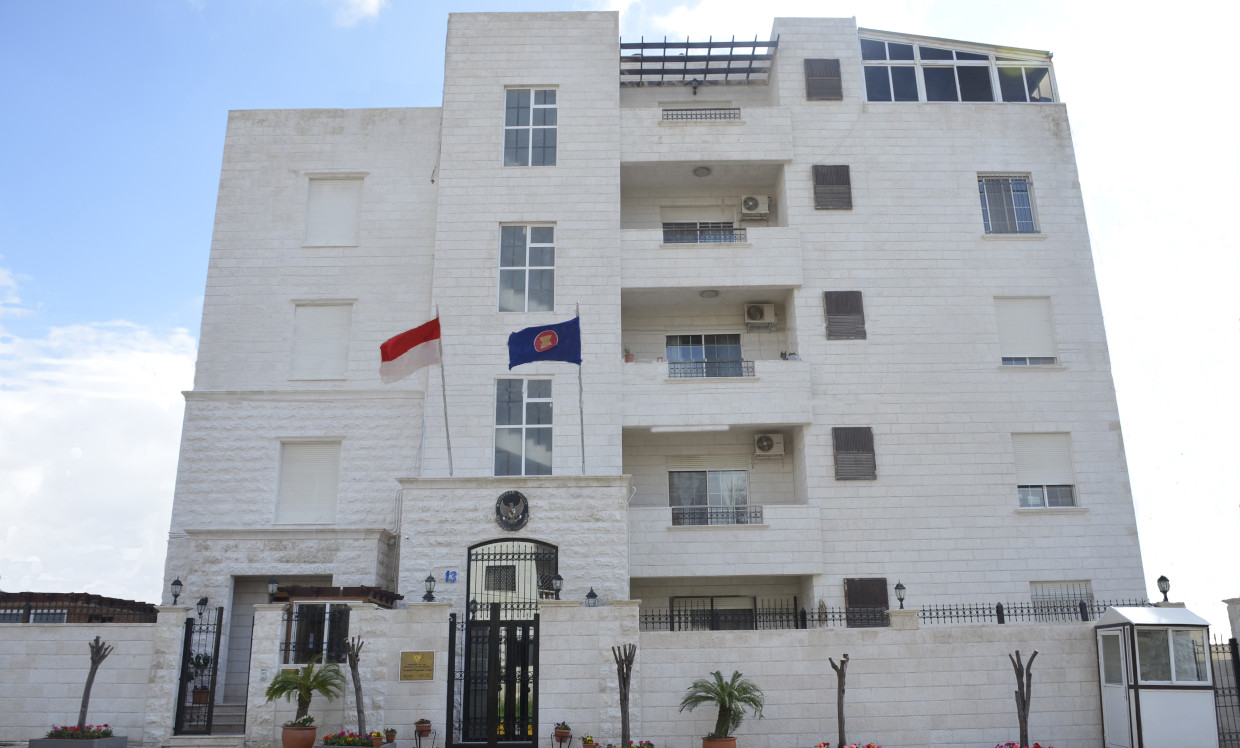
Embassy of Indonesia

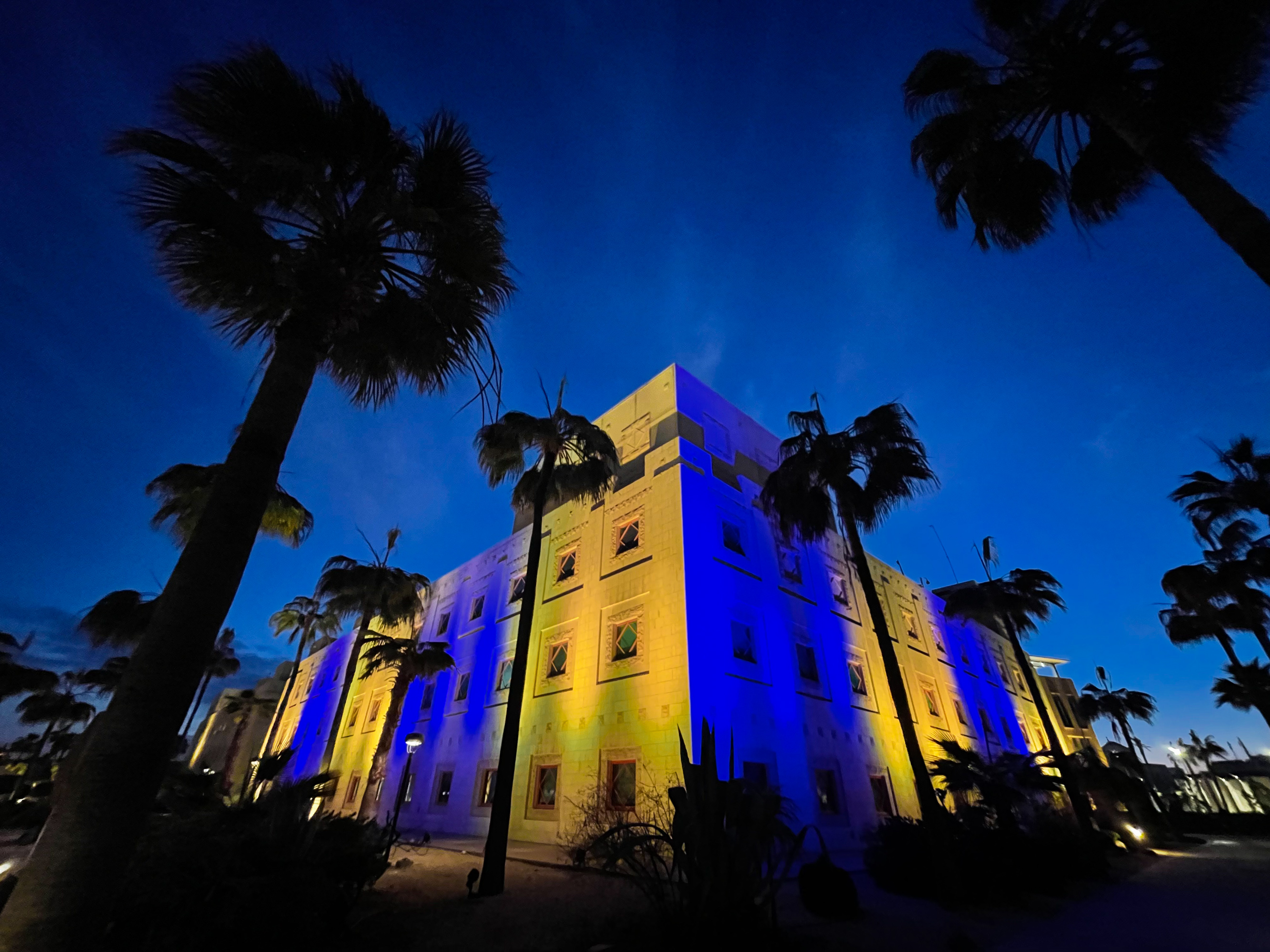
Embassy of the United States

== Consulate in Aqaba ==
- Egypt

== Non-resident embassies accredited to Jordan ==
=== Resident in Abu Dhabi, UAE ===
- Costa Rica
- Dominica
- Ethiopia
- Fiji

=== Resident in Ankara, Turkey ===
- North Macedonia
- Moldova
- New Zealand
- Nicaragua

=== Resident in Beirut, Lebanon ===
- Colombia
- Denmark
- Finland
- Paraguay
- Slovakia

=== Resident in Cairo, Egypt ===
- Albania
- Angola
- Bolivia
- Burkina Faso
- Cameroon
- Central African Republic
- Chad
- Congo-Brazzaville
- Croatia
- Dominican Republic
- Ecuador
- Eritrea
- Estonia
- Ethiopia
- Guatemala
- Guinea
- Honduras
- Kenya
- Latvia
- Liberia
- Lithuania
- Malawi
- Mali
- Mongolia
- Peru
- Portugal
- Singapore
- Slovenia
- South Sudan
- Uruguay
- Zambia
- Zimbabwe

=== Resident in Damascus, Syria ===
- Argentina
- Armenia
- Belarus
- Cuba
- Mauritania
- Serbia

=== Resident in Doha, Qatar ===
- Burundi

=== Resident in Kuwait City ===
- Djibouti
- Kyrgyzstan
- Malta
- Niger
- North Korea
- Senegal
- Sierra Leone

=== Resident in Riyadh, Saudi Arabia ===
- Benin
- Equatorial Guinea
- Gambia
- Ghana
- Ivory Coast
- Kosovo
- Maldives
- Nepal
- Somalia
- Turkmenistan
- Tajikistan
- Uganda
- Uzbekistan
- Vietnam

=== Resident elsewhere ===
- Estonia (Athens)
- Haiti (Rome)
- Iceland (London)
- San Marino (Rome)

== Former embassies ==
- Afghanistan (closed sometime after 2021)
- Denmark (closed in 2010) (Note: Resident in Beirut, Lebanon)
- Ethiopia (closed in 1970) (Note: Resident in Abu Dhabi, United Arab Emirates)
- Mauritania (Note: Resident in Damascus, Syria)
- North Korea (closed in 1998) (Note: Resident in Kuwait city, Kuwait)

== See also ==
- Foreign relations of Jordan
- List of diplomatic missions of Jordan
- Visa requirements for Jordanian citizens
