= List of diplomatic missions of Jordan =

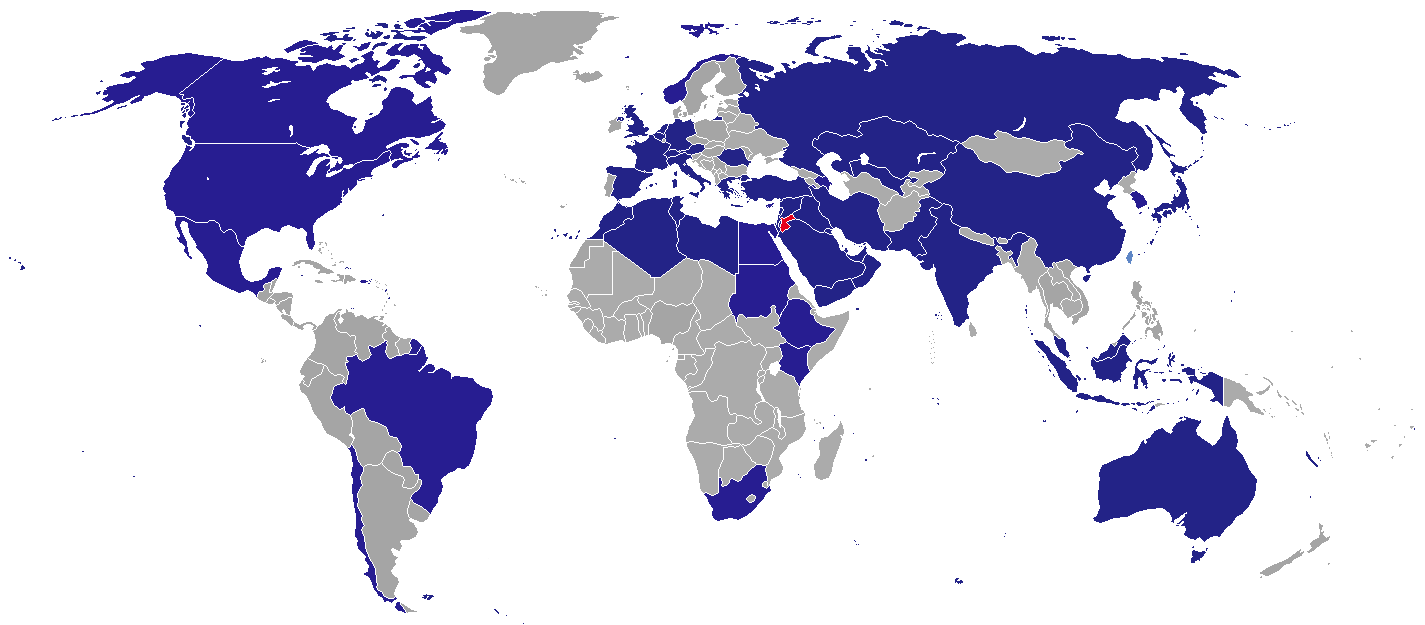
States hosting a diplomatic mission of Jordan

This is a list of diplomatic missions of Jordan.

== Africa ==
Host country	Host city	Type of mission	Concurrent accreditation	Ref.
Algeria	Algiers	Embassy		
Egypt	Cairo	Embassy	International Organizations: Arab League	
Ethiopia	Addis Ababa	Embassy	Countries: South Sudan; International Organizations: African Union (Note: Accredited as an observer mission.)	
Kenya	Nairobi	Embassy	Countries: Rwanda; Uganda; International Organizations: United Nations; United Nations Environment Programme; United Nations Human Settlements Programme	
Libya	Tripoli	Embassy		
Morocco	Rabat	Embassy	Countries: Mauritania	
Morocco	Laayoune	Consulate-General	Countries: Mauritania	
South Africa	Pretoria	Embassy	Countries: Mozambique	
Sudan	Khartoum	Embassy	Countries: Chad	
Tunisia	Tunis	Embassy	Countries: Malta	

== Americas ==
Host country	Host city	Type of mission	Concurrent accreditation	Ref.
Brazil	Brasília	Embassy	Countries: Colombia; Ecuador; Paraguay; Peru; Venezuela	
Canada	Ottawa	Embassy		
Chile	Santiago de Chile	Embassy	Countries: Bolivia; Uruguay	
Mexico	Mexico City	Embassy	Countries: Belize; Costa Rica; El Salvador; Guatemala; Honduras; Nicaragua; Panama	
United States	Washington, D.C.	Embassy		

== Asia ==
Host country	Host city	Type of mission	Concurrent accreditation	Ref.
Azerbaijan	Baku	Embassy	Countries: Georgia	
Bahrain	Manama	Embassy		
China	Beijing	Embassy		
India	New Delhi	Embassy	Countries: Nepal; Sri Lanka	
Indonesia	Jakarta	Embassy	Countries: Brunei; International Organizations: Association of Southeast Asian Nations	
Iran	Tehran	Embassy		
Iraq	Baghdad	Embassy		
Iraq	Erbil	Consulate-General		
Israel	Tel Aviv	Embassy		
Japan	Tokyo	Embassy	Countries: Philippines	
Kazakhstan	Astana	Embassy	Countries: Kyrgyzstan	
Kuwait	Kuwait City	Embassy		
Lebanon	Beirut	Embassy		
Malaysia	Kuala Lumpur	Embassy	Countries: Thailand	
Oman	Muscat	Embassy	Countries: Eritrea	
Palestine	Ramallah	Representative office		
Pakistan	Islamabad	Embassy	Countries: Afghanistan; Bangladesh; Maldives; Tajikistan	
Qatar	Doha	Embassy		
Republic of China (Taiwan)	Taipei	Commercial office		
Saudi Arabia	Riyadh	Embassy		
Saudi Arabia	Jeddah	Consulate-General		
Singapore	Singapore	Embassy	Countries: Vietnam	
South Korea	Seoul	Embassy		
Syria	Damascus	Embassy		
Turkey	Ankara	Embassy	Countries: Kosovo; North Macedonia; Turkmenistan; Ukraine	
United Arab Emirates	Abu Dhabi	Embassy	International Organizations: International Renewable Energy Agency	
United Arab Emirates	Dubai	Consulate-General	International Organizations: International Renewable Energy Agency	
Uzbekistan	Tashkent	Embassy		
Yemen	Sanaa	Embassy		

== Europe ==
Host country	Host city	Type of mission	Concurrent accreditation	Ref.
Austria	Vienna	Embassy	Countries: Czechia; Hungary; Slovakia; Slovenia; International Organizations: United Nations; CTBTO Preparatory Commission; International Atomic Energy Agency; Organization for Security and Co-operation in Europe; United Nations Commission on International Trade Law; United Nations Industrial Development Organization; United Nations Office for Outer Space Affairs; United Nations Office on Drugs and Crime	
Belgium	Brussels	Embassy	Countries: Luxembourg; International Organizations: European Union; NATO	
Cyprus	Nicosia	Embassy		
France	Paris	Embassy	Countries: Holy See; Monaco; International Organizations: UNESCO	
Germany	Berlin	Embassy	Countries: Finland; Poland	
Greece	Athens	Embassy	Countries: Albania; Montenegro; Serbia	
Italy	Rome	Embassy	Countries: Bosnia and Herzegovina; Croatia; San Marino; International Organizations: Food and Agriculture Organization; International Fund for Agricultural Development; World Food Programme; Sovereign entity: Sovereign Military Order of Malta	
Netherlands	The Hague	Embassy	Countries: Estonia; Latvia; Lithuania; International Organizations: OPCW	
Norway	Oslo	Embassy	Countries: Denmark; Sweden	
Romania	Bucharest	Embassy	Countries: Bulgaria; Moldova	
Russia	Moscow	Embassy	Countries: Armenia; Belarus	
Spain	Madrid	Embassy	Countries: Andorra; International Organizations: UN Tourism	
Switzerland	Bern	Embassy	Countries: Portugal	
United Kingdom	London	Embassy	Countries: Iceland; Ireland; International Organizations: International Maritime Organization	

== Oceania ==
Host country	Host city	Type of mission	Concurrent accreditation	Ref.
Australia	Canberra	Embassy	Countries: New Zealand	

== Multilateral organisations ==
Organization	Host city	Host country	Type of mission	Concurrent accreditation	Ref.
United Nations	New York City	United States	Permanent Mission	Countries: Cuba; Dominican Republic	
United Nations	Geneva	Switzerland	Permanent Mission	International Organizations: World Trade Organization	

== Gallery ==
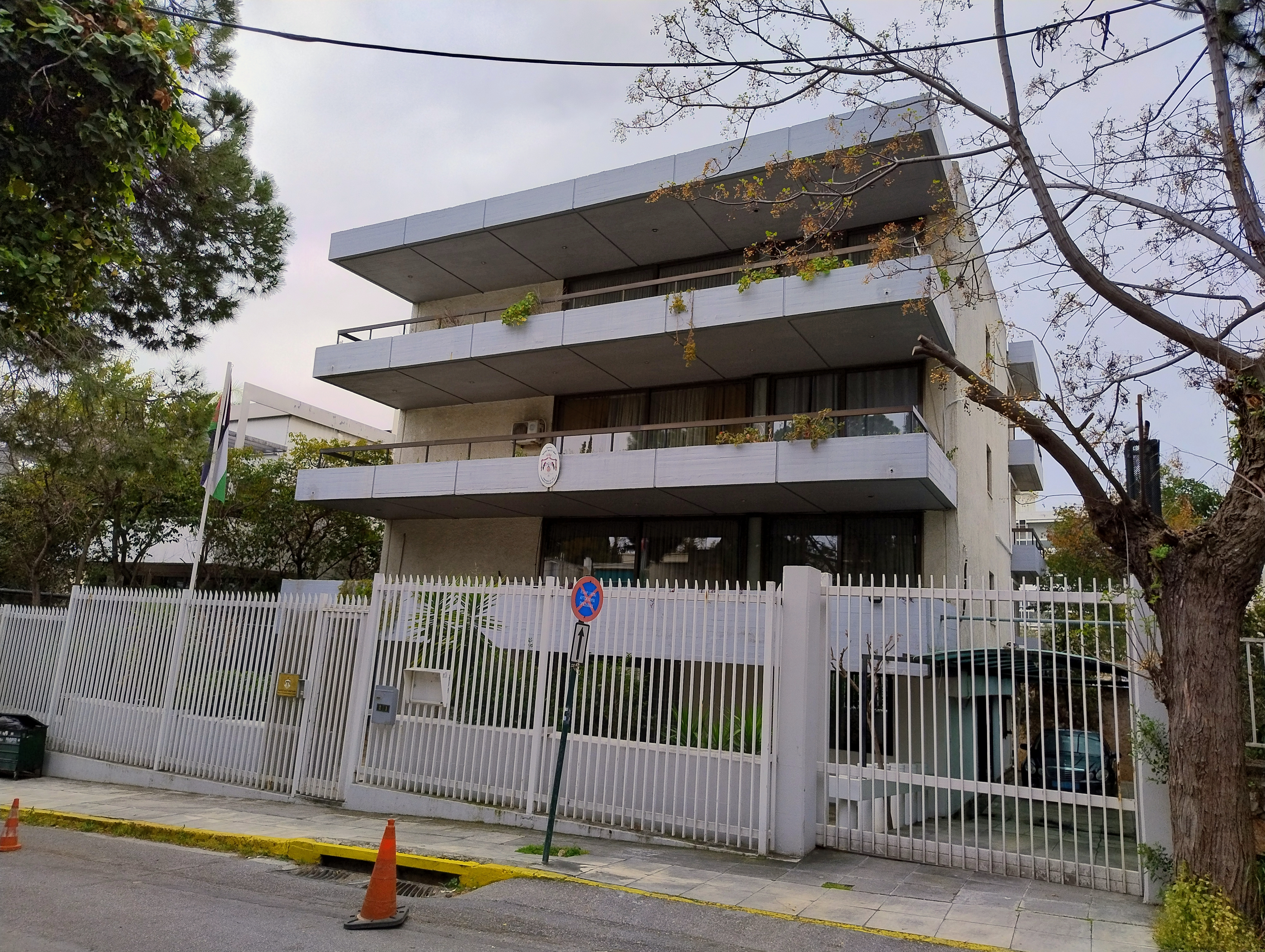
Embassy in Athens

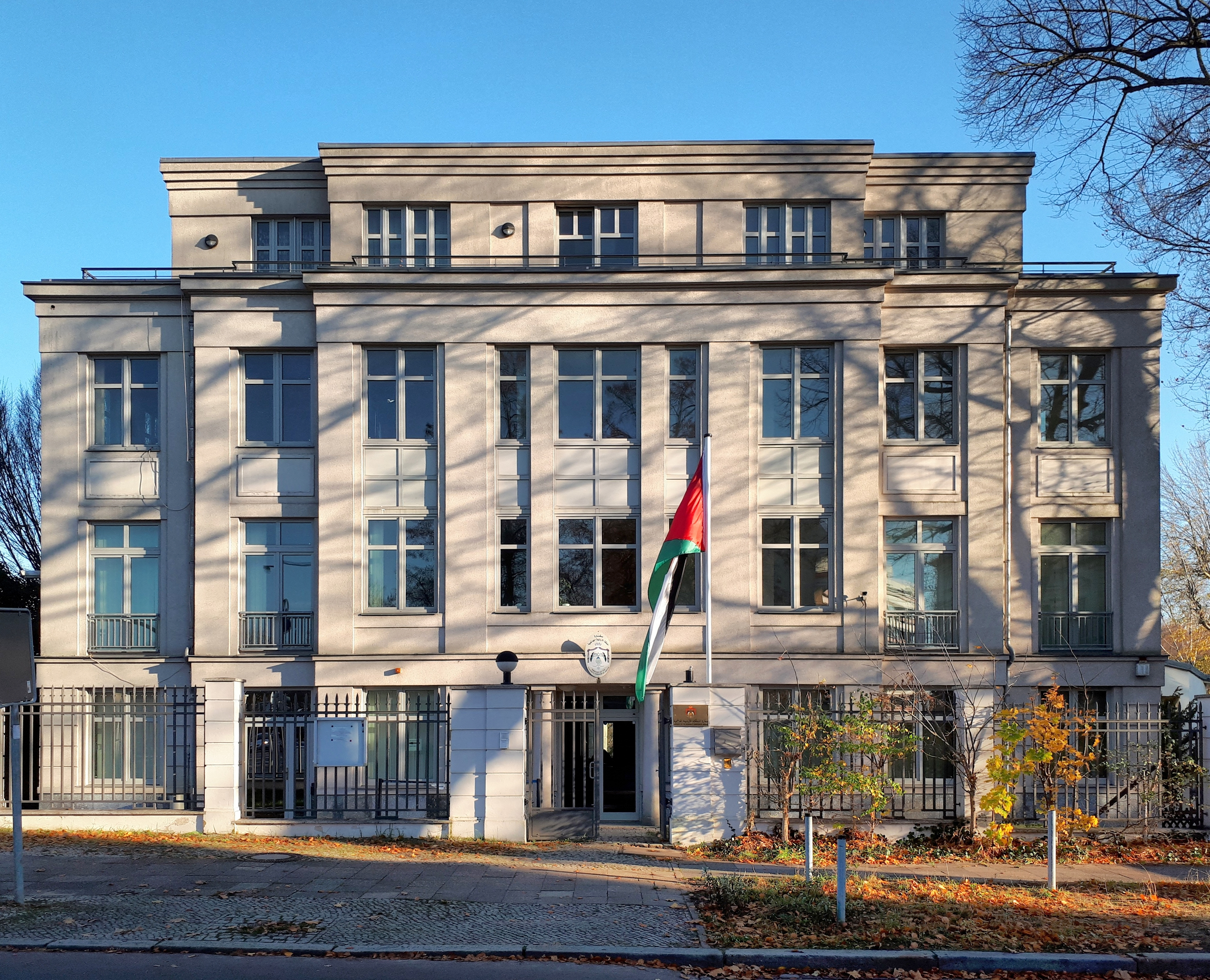
Embassy in Berlin

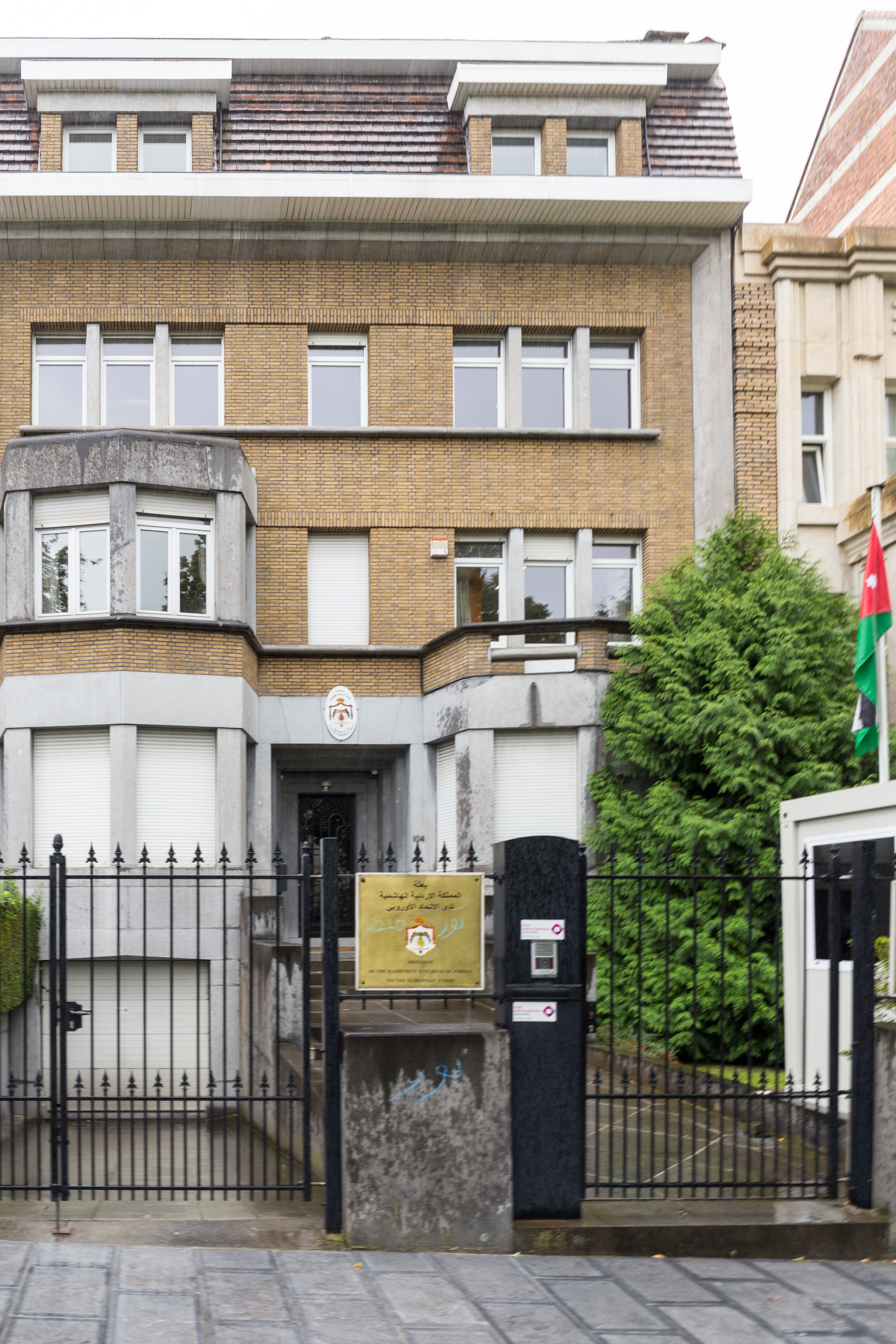
Embassy in Brussels

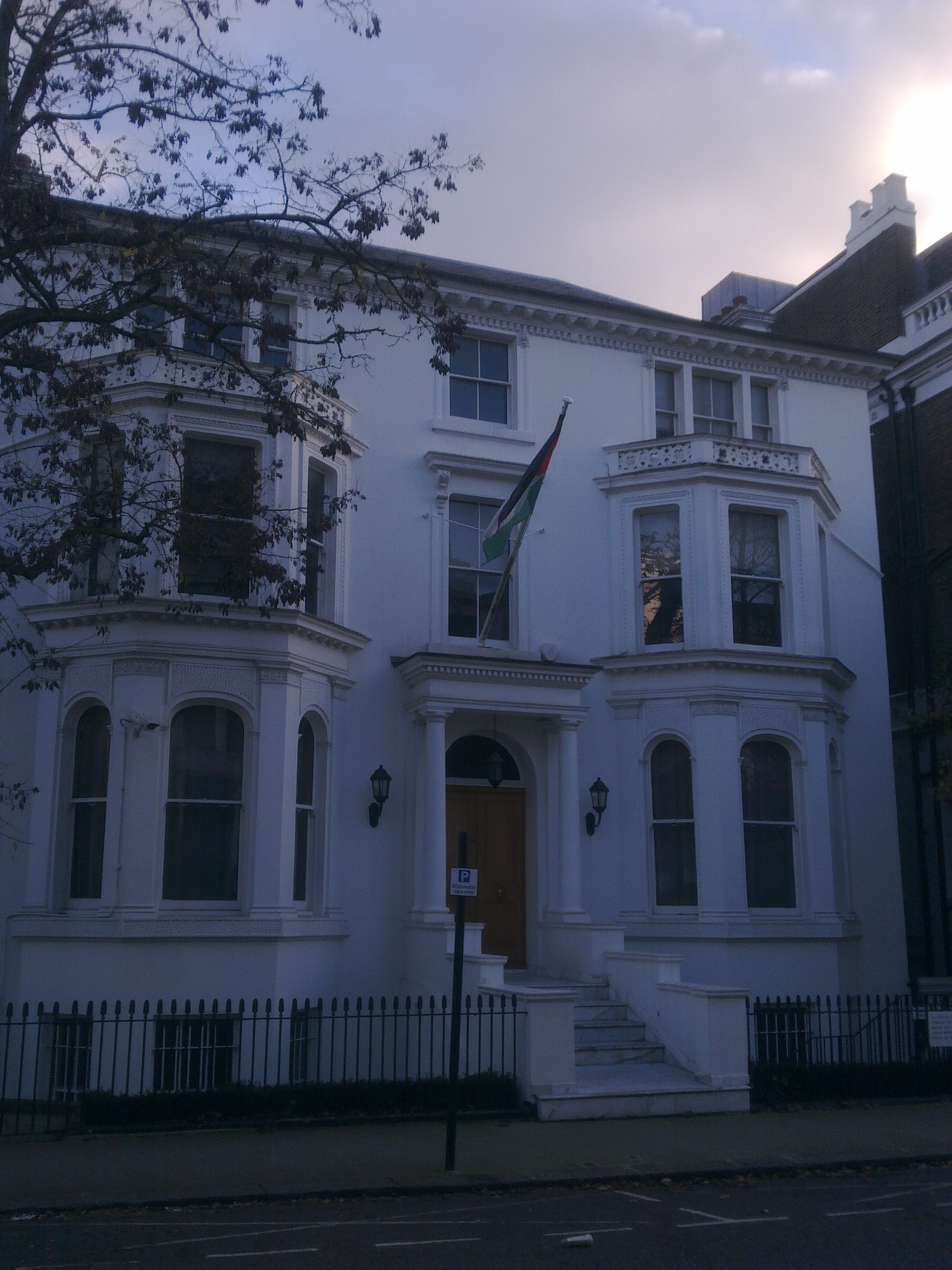
Embassy in London

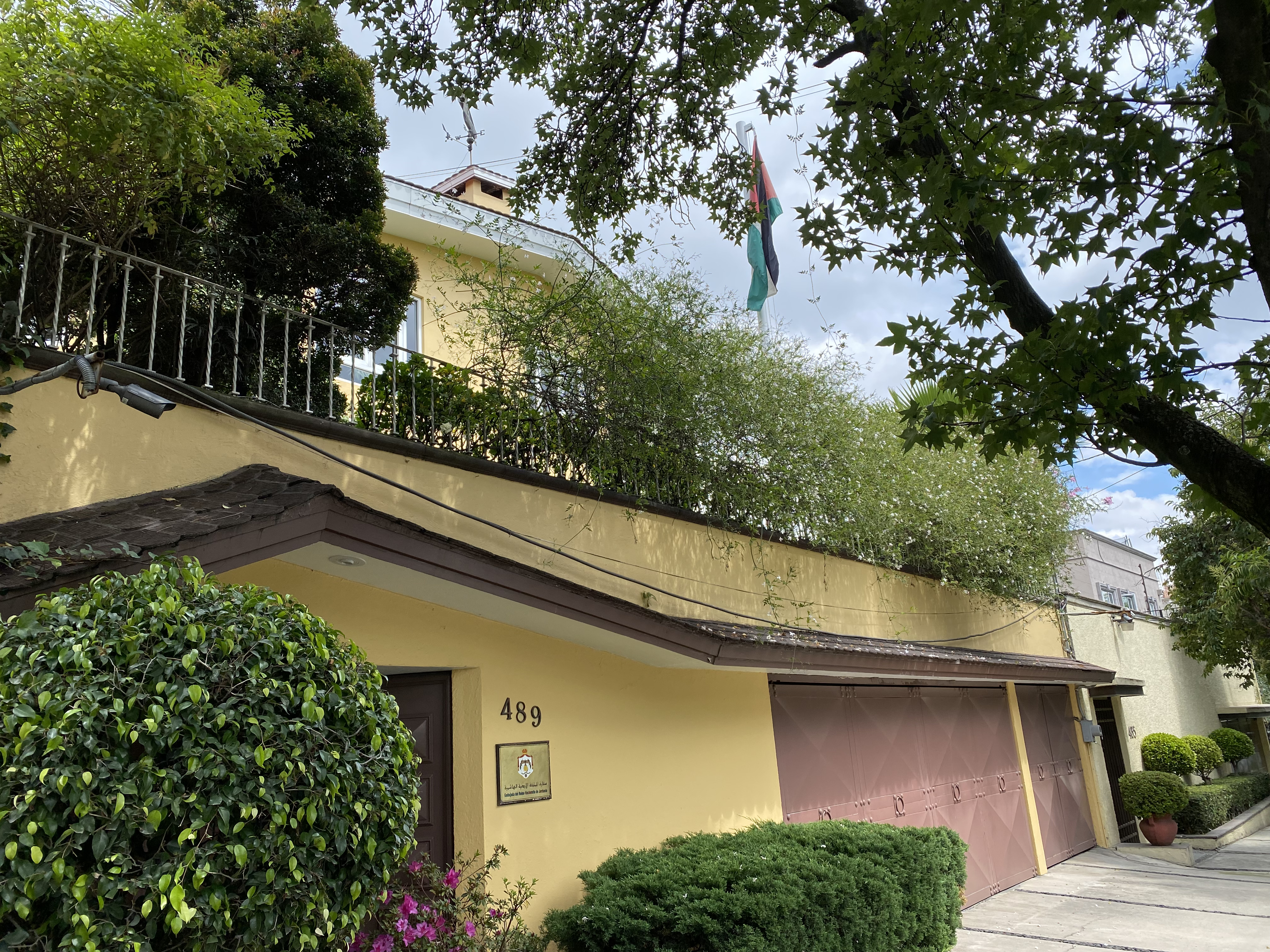
Embassy in Mexico City

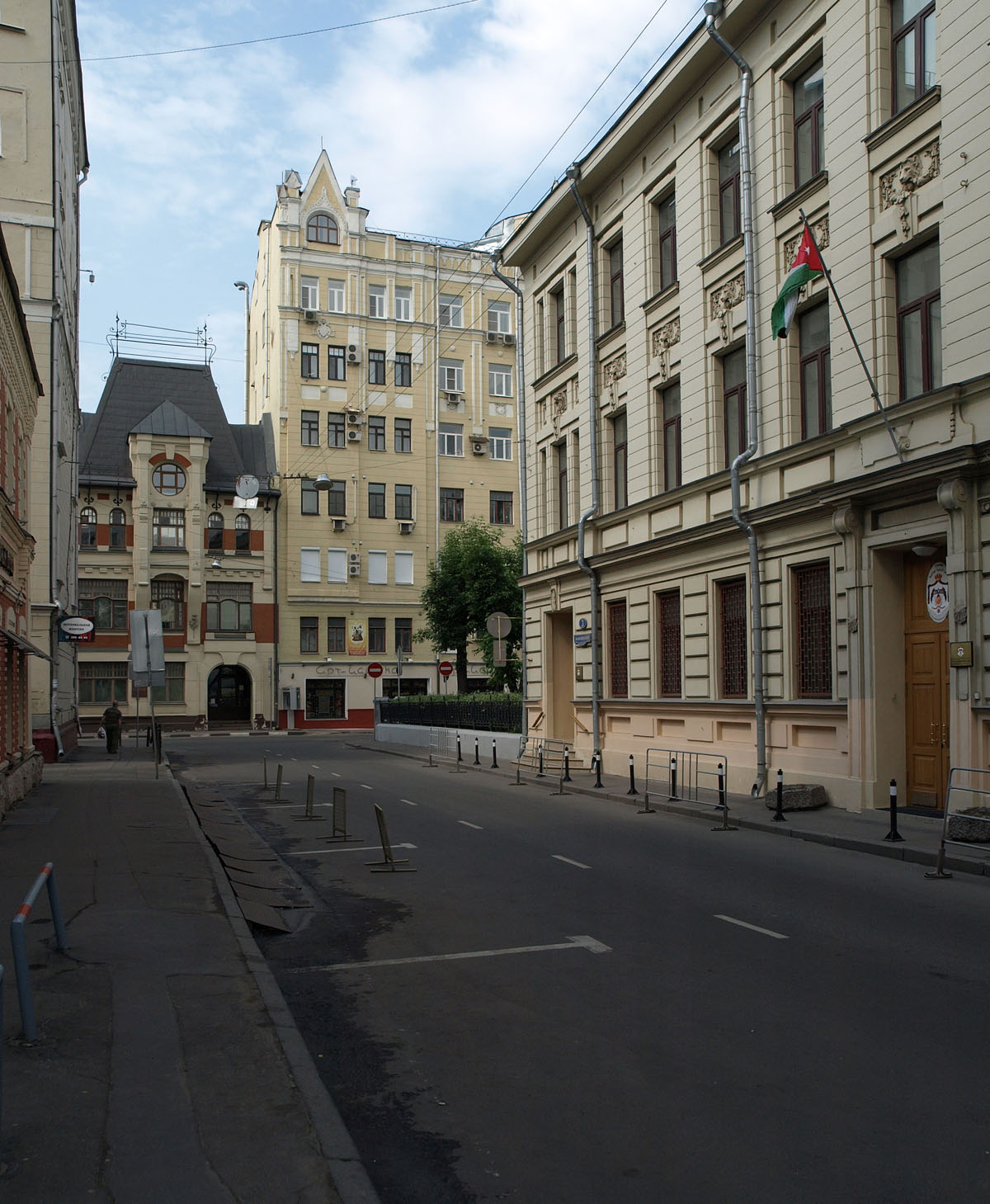
Embassy in Moscow

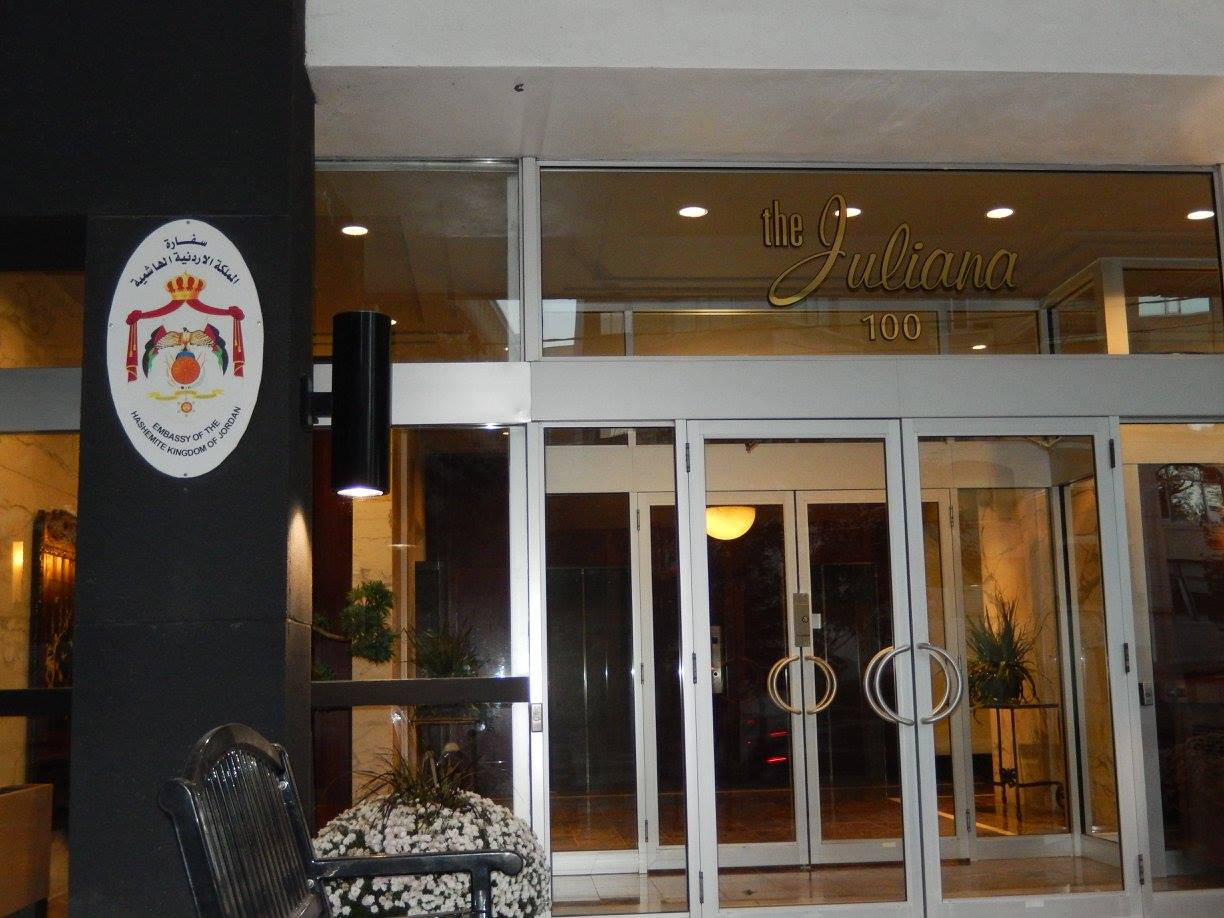
Embassy in Ottawa

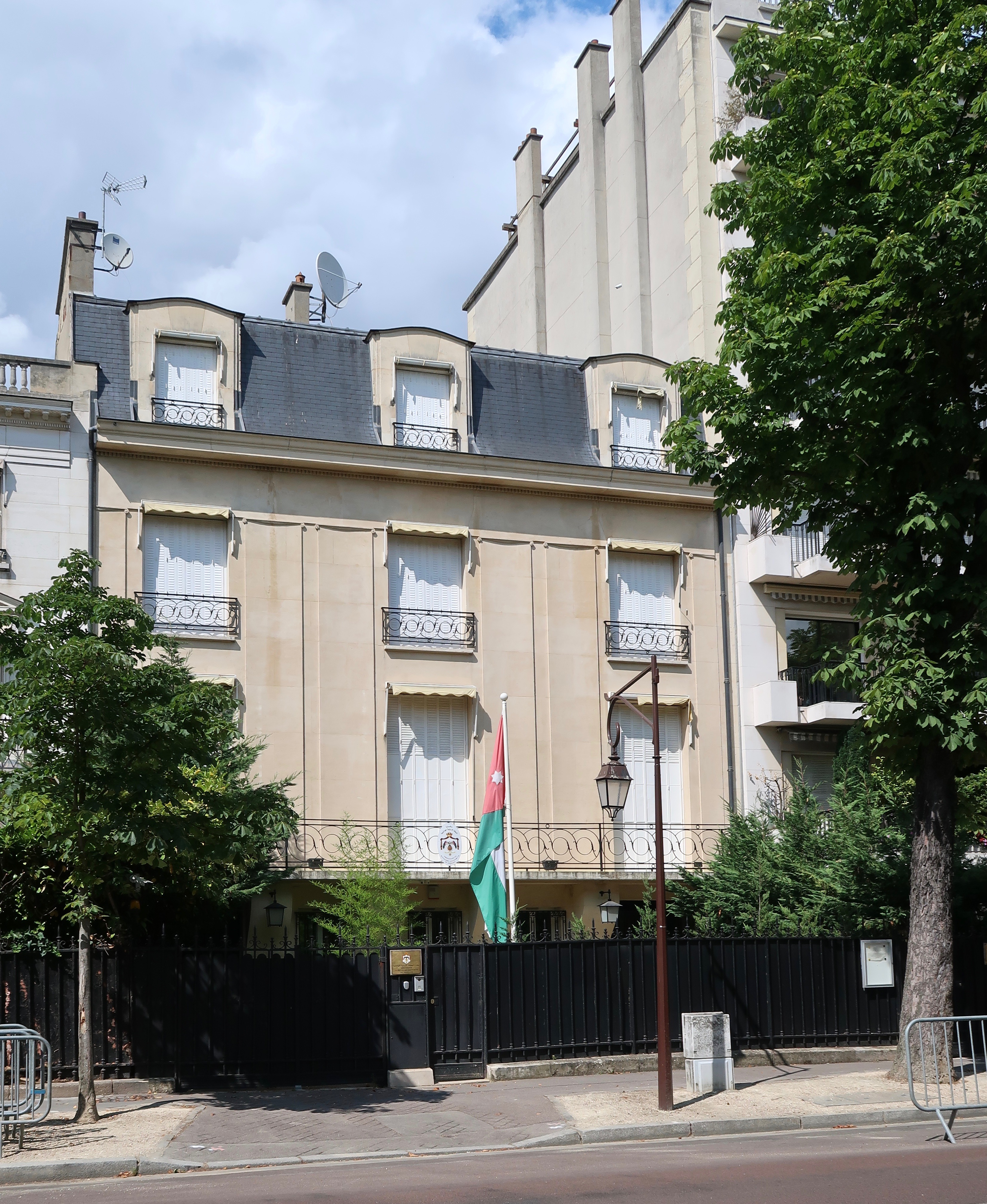
Embassy in Paris

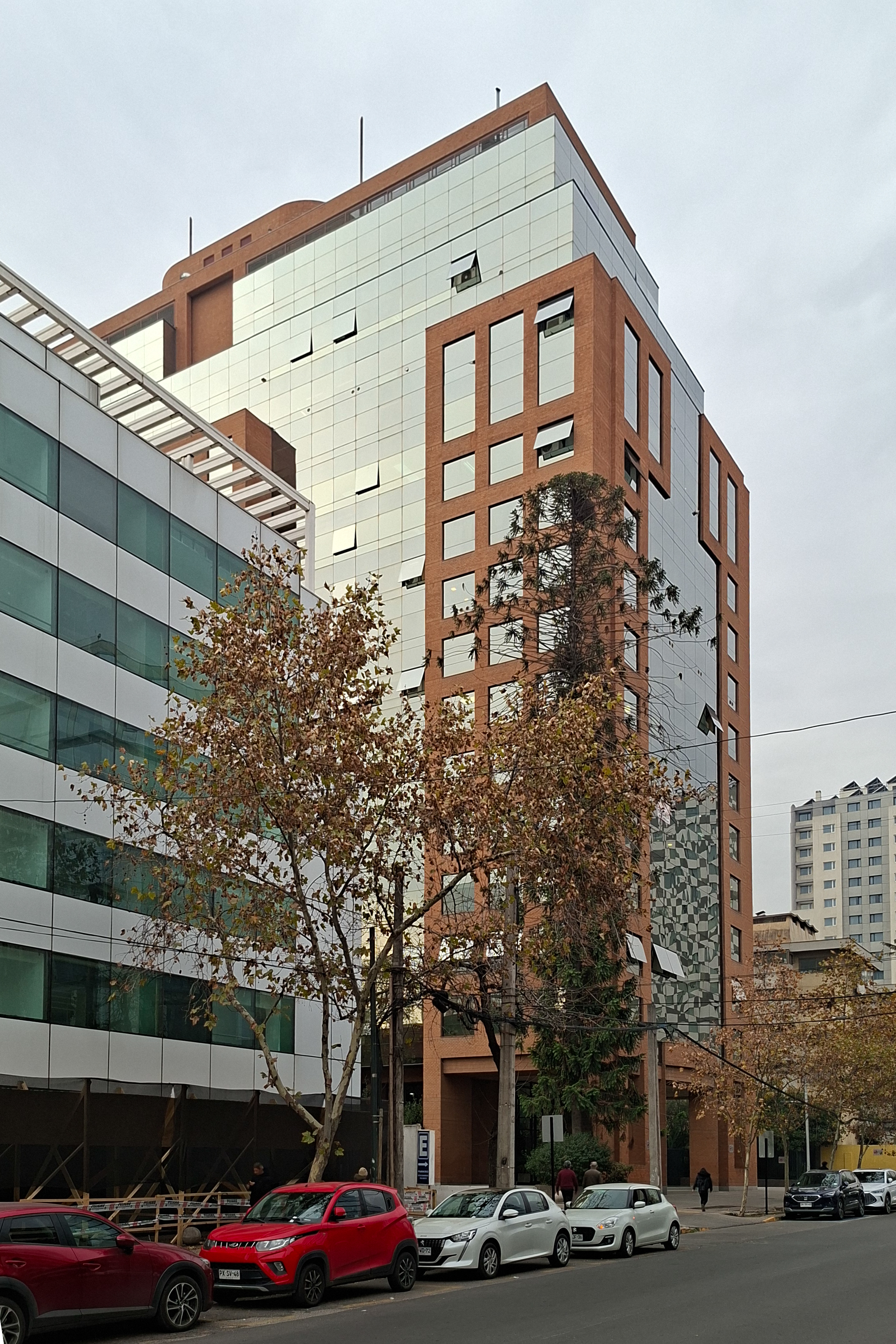
Embassy in Santiago

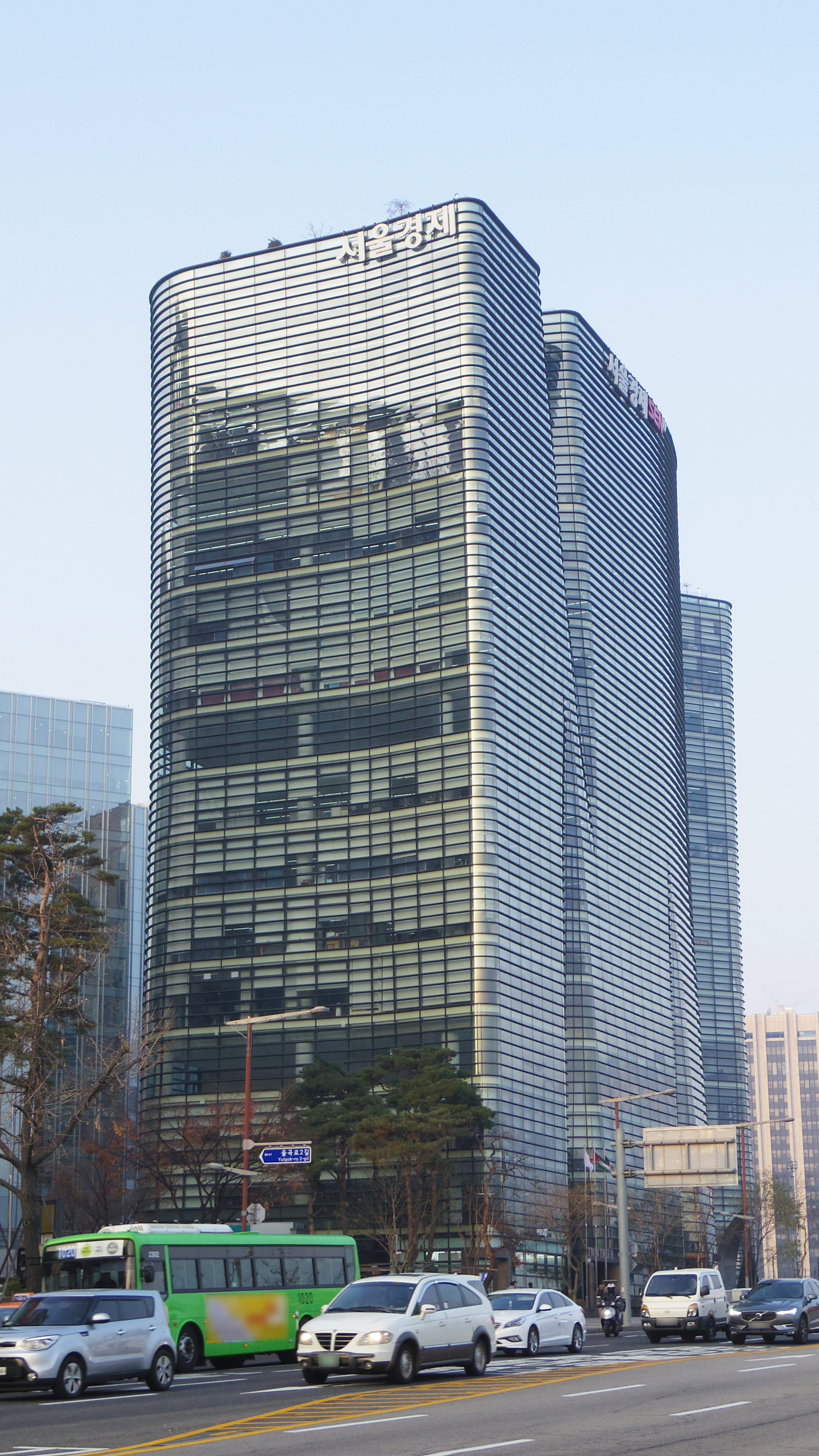
Building hosting the Embassy in Seoul

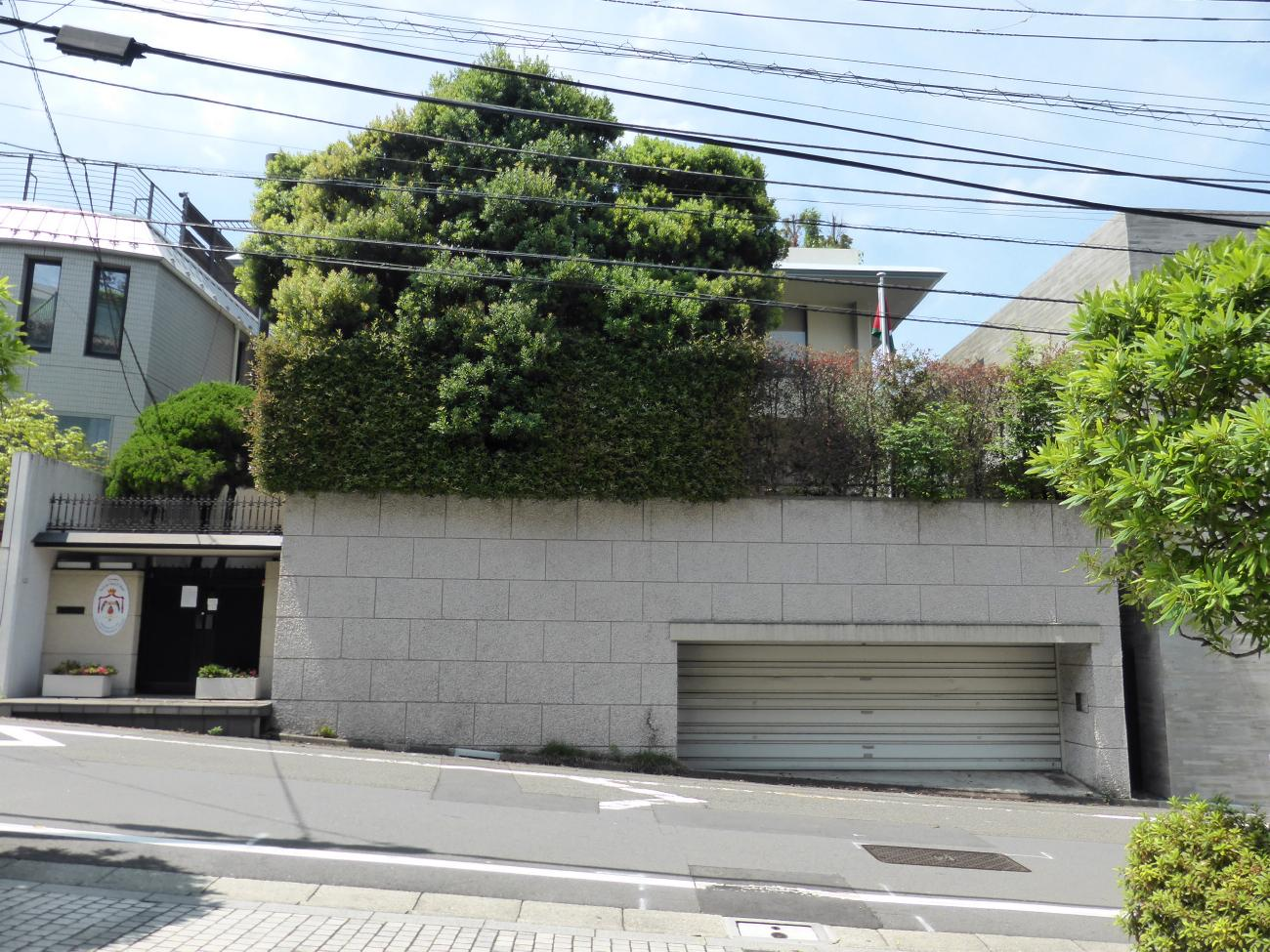
Embassy in Tokyo

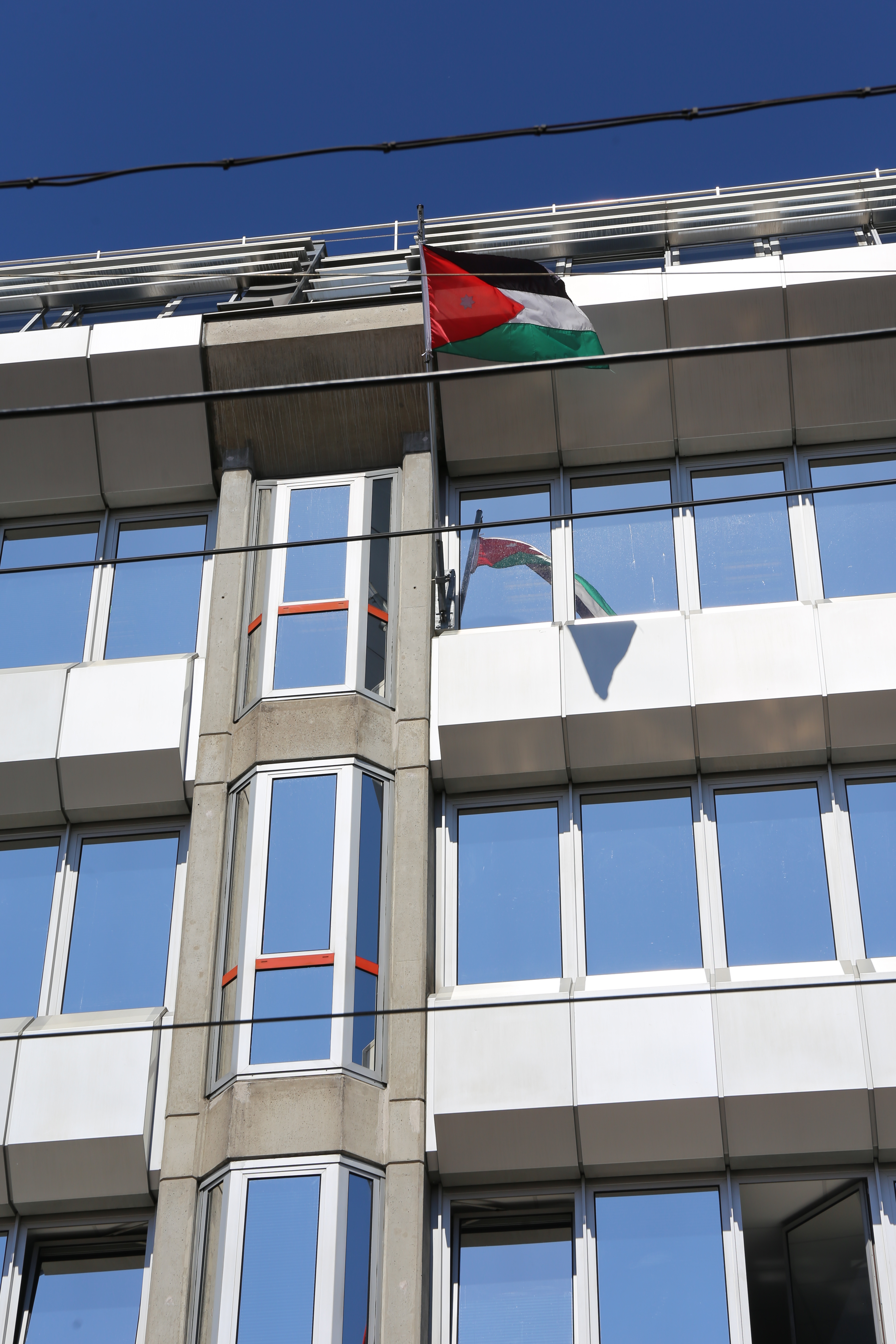
Embassy in Vienna

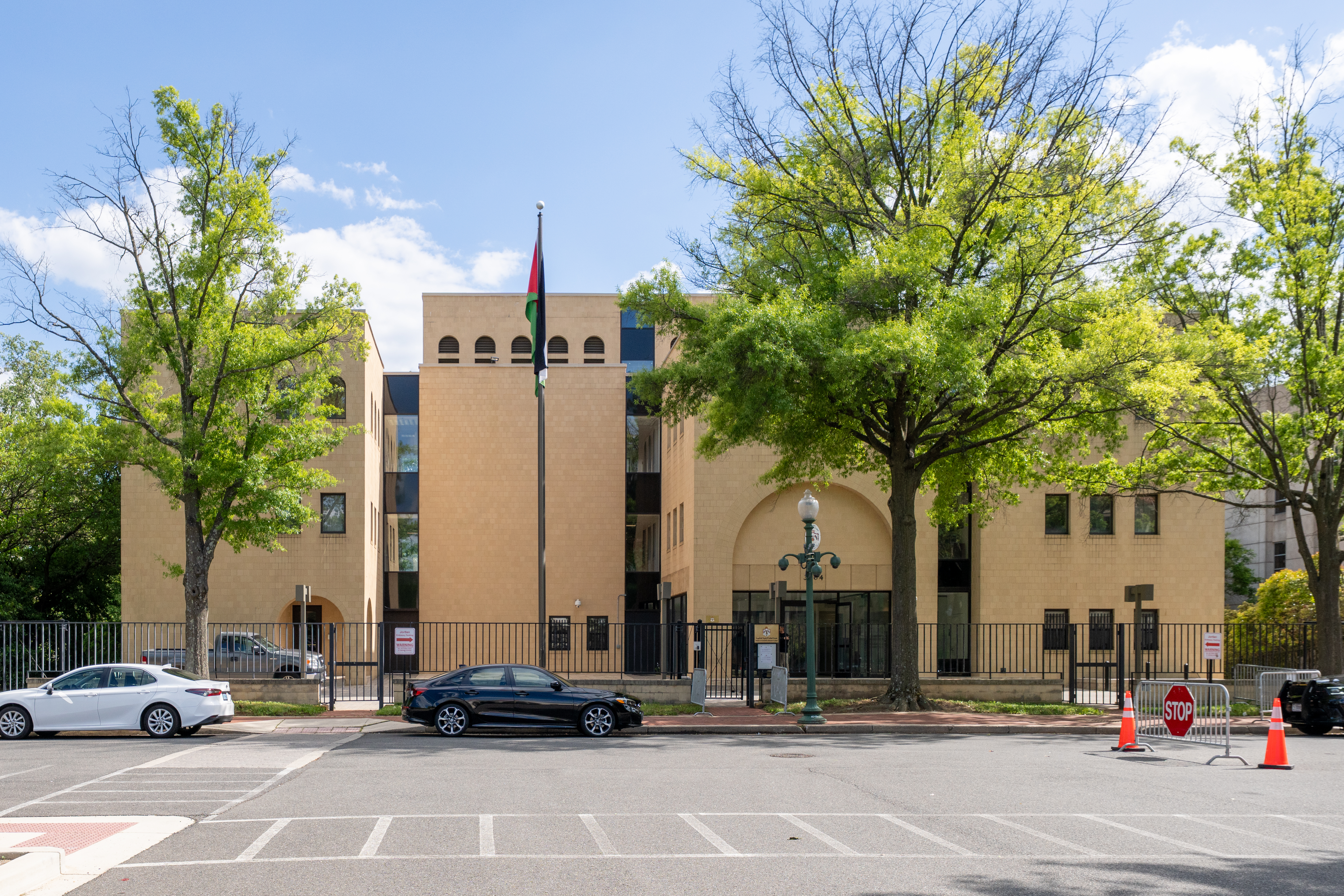
Embassy in Washington, D.C.

== See also ==
- Foreign relations of Jordan
- List of diplomatic missions in Jordan
- Visa policy of Jordan
