= Ray Mountains =

Mountain range in central Alaska, U.S.

- Location within Alaska

Highest point
- Peak: Mount Tozi
- Elevation: 5,519 ft (1,682 m)
- Coordinates: 65°46′6″N 151°44′40″W

Geography
- Country: United States
- State: Alaska
- Range coordinates: 65°46′06″N 151°44′40″W

The Ray Mountains is a mountain range in central Alaska named for the Ray River, itself named for United States Army Captain Patrick Henry Ray, who established a meteorological station in Barrow, Alaska, in 1881. The mountains are within the Yukon-Tanana Uplands, an area of low mountain ranges that also includes the White Mountains. The Ray Mountains cover an area of 10,600 square miles (27,454 km^{2}) and are bordered on the east by the Yukon River, on the south by the Tozitna River, and on the north by Kanuti National Wildlife Refuge. The highest point in the Ray Mountains is Mount Tozi, which has a summit elevation of 5,519 feet (1,682 m). Other notable peaks include Wolf Mountain, Mount Henry Eakin, the Kokrines Hills, and Moran Dome.

== Sources ==
- "Ray Mountains". Geographic Names Information System. United States Geological Survey, United States Department of the Interior.
- Gates, Douglas. "Yukon-Tanana Uplands", Greatlandofalaska.com. Accessed February 17, 2009.
- Bureau of Land Management. Kanuti NWR/Ray Mountains/Hogatza River Earth Cover Classification, Department of the Interior. September 2002. Accessed February 17, 2009.
