= Hayfork =

Hayfork may refer to:

- Pitchfork, a tool that farmers use to manually move hay
- Hay fork (machine), the grapple device used together with ropes and pulleys to move hay from a hay wagon to a haystack in a barn loft
- Hayfork, California, a census-designated place in Trinity County, California
