= Troy, Walworth County, Wisconsin =

Troy, Wisconsin
- Town
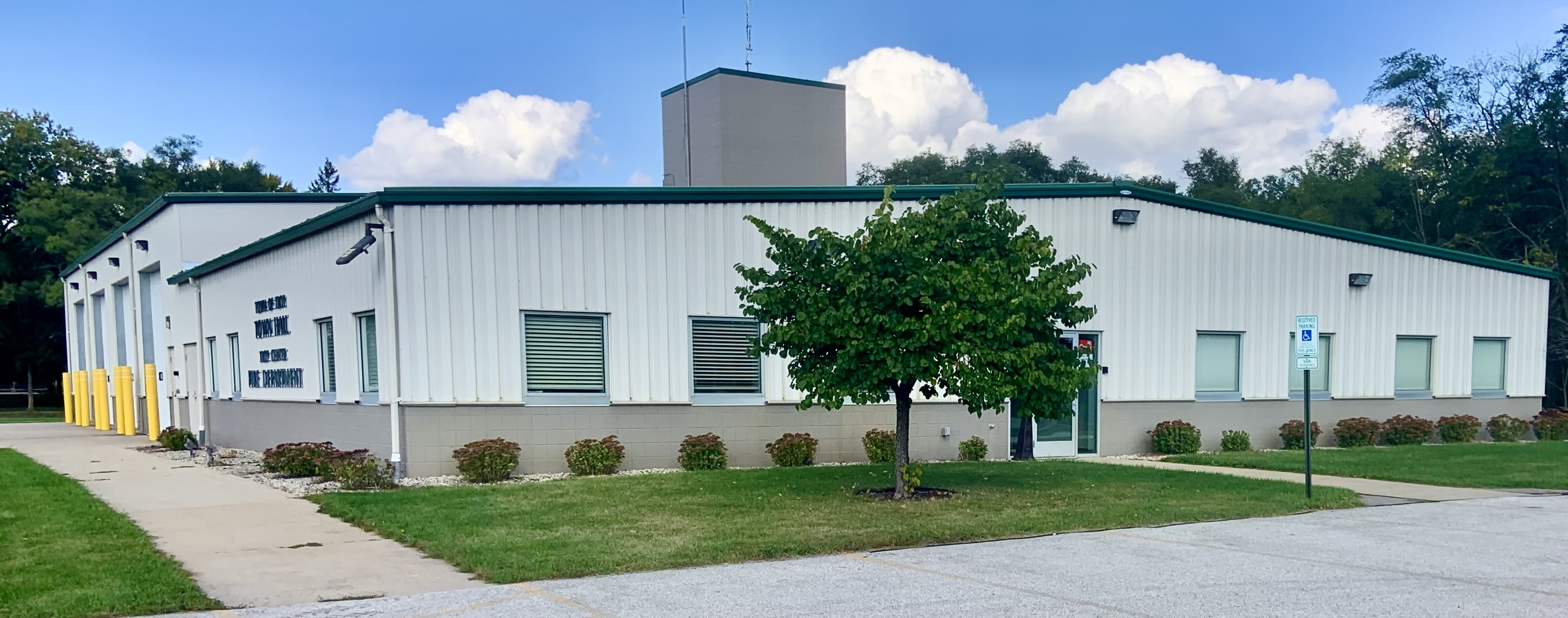
- Town hall

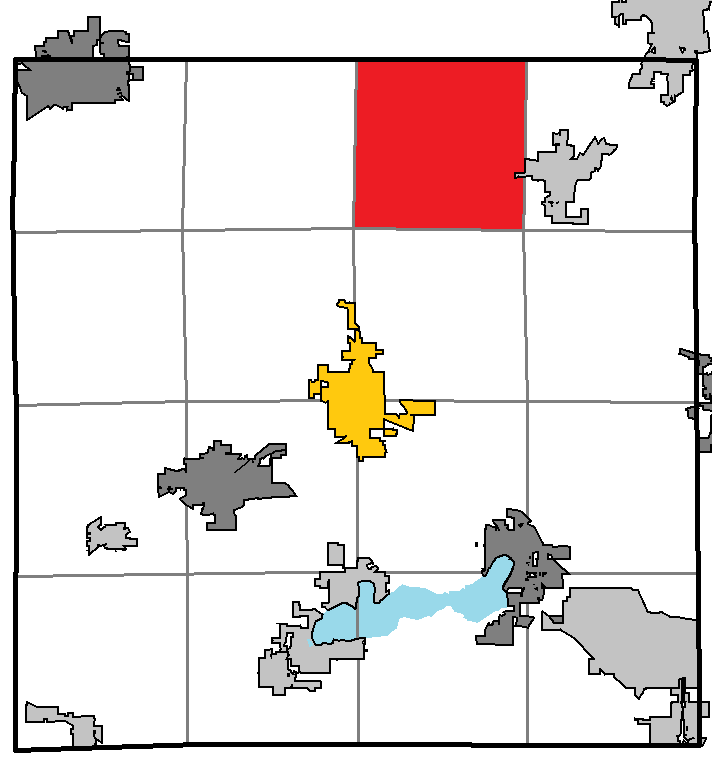
- Location of Troy, within Walworth County

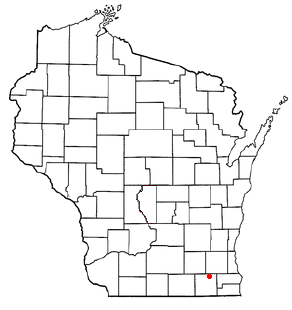
- Location of Troy, Wisconsin
- Coordinates: 42°48′14″N 88°28′45″W
- Country: United States
- State: Wisconsin
- County: Walworth

Area
  - Total: 35.4 sq mi (91.8 km^{2})
  - Land: 35 sq mi (90 km^{2})
  - Water: 0.69 sq mi (1.8 km^{2})
- Elevation: 915 ft (279 m)

Population (2020)
  - Total: 2,355
  - Density: 67/sq mi (25.9/km^{2})
- Time zone: UTC-6 (Central (CST))
  - Summer (DST): UTC-5 (CDT)
- Zip: 53180
- Area code: 262
- FIPS code: 55-80875
- GNIS feature ID: 1584299
- Website: troywalworthwi.gov

Troy is a town in Walworth County, Wisconsin, United States. The population was 2,355 at the 2020 census. The unincorporated communities of Adams, Little Prairie, and Troy Center are located in the town. The ghost town of Mayhews was also located in the town.

== Geography ==
According to the United States Census Bureau, the town has a total area of 35.4 square miles (91.8 km^{2}), of which 34.7 square miles (90 km^{2}) is land and 0.7 square mile (1.8 km^{2}) (1.95%) is water.

== Demographics ==
As of the census of 2000, there were 2,328 people, 837 households, and 660 families residing in the town. The population density was 67 people per square mile (25.9/km^{2}). There were 904 housing units at an average density of 26 per square mile (10/km^{2}). The racial makeup of the town was 98.58% White, 0.13% African American, 0.34% Native American, 0.43% Asian, 0.39% from other races, and 0.13% from two or more races. Hispanic or Latino people of any race were 1.46% of the population.

There were 837 households, out of which 34.4% had children under the age of 18 living with them, 70.8% were married couples living together, 5.4% had a female householder with no husband present, and 21.1% were non-families. 16% of all households were made up of individuals, and 6.1% had someone living alone who was 65 years of age or older. The average household size was 2.75 and the average family size was 3.09.

In the town, the population was spread out, with 25.8% under the age of 18, 7.1% from 18 to 24, 27.4% from 25 to 44, 28.9% from 45 to 64, and 10.8% who were 65 years of age or older. The median age was 39 years. For every 100 females, there were 103.3 males. For every 100 females age 18 and over, there were 104.9 males.

The median income for a household in the town was $57,604, and the median income for a family was $59,167. Males had a median income of $41,467 versus $26,969 for females. The per capita income for the town was $24,200. About 2.4% of families and 4.6% of the population were below the poverty line, including 5.1% of those under age 18 and 12.3% of those age 65 or over.

== Notable people ==
- Doc Adkins, baseball player
- Joseph D. Bryant, physician, born in the town
- Nathaniel M. Bunker, politician
