= Taipei Economic and Cultural Office, Amman =

Political representative office in Kuwait

Taipei Economic and Cultural Office in Jordan 駐約旦臺北經濟文化辦事處
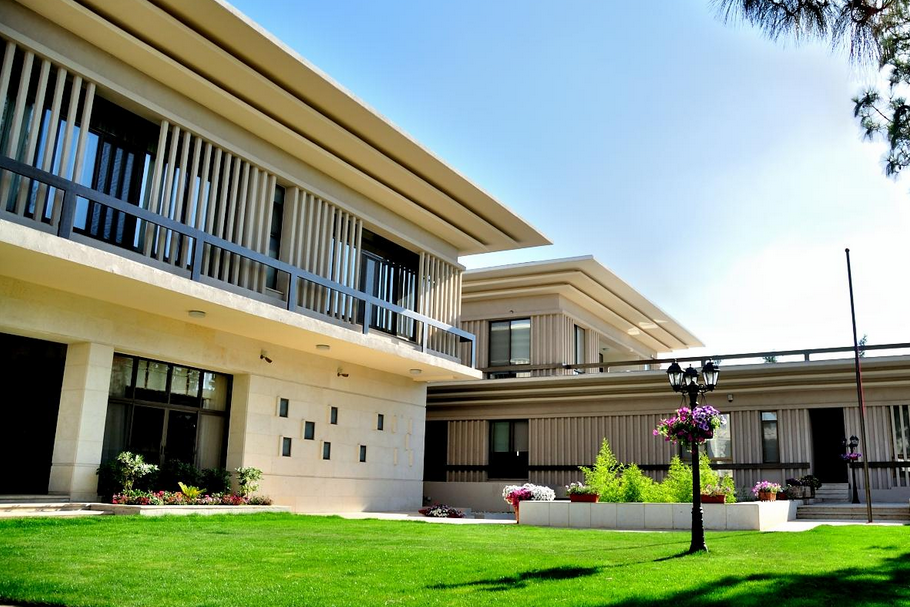

Agency overview
- Formed: May 1977 (as Far East Commercial Office in Jordan)
- Jurisdiction: Jordan; Egypt; Iraq; Lebanon; Libya; Palestine; Syria
- Headquarters: No. 18 Iritiria Street, Um Uthaina, Amman, Jordan
- Agency executive: Syin-yi Yang, Representative
- Website: Official website

The Taipei Economic and Cultural Office in Jordan (Chinese: 駐約旦臺北經濟文化辦事處; pinyin: Zhù Yuēdàn Táiběi jīngjì wénhuà bànshì chǔ) represents the interests of Taiwan in the Hashemite Kingdom of Jordan in the absence of formal diplomatic relations, functioning as a de facto embassy. Its counterpart is the Jordanian Commercial Office in Taipei, which was established on 25 November 1977.

== Background ==
The aim of the representative office is to further bilateral cooperation between Jordan and Taiwan in the fields of economics, culture, education and research. In addition, it offers consular services and the consular jurisdiction of the office also extends to Egypt, Iraq, Lebanon, Libya, Palestine and Syria.

On 15 May 1977, the Republic of China established the Far East Commercial Office in Jordan, at the capital city of Amman. On 25 March 1992, the Far East Commercial Office was renamed to Commercial Office of the Republic of China (Taiwan) in Jordan and officially was opened on April 16, making it one of the few Taiwanese missions that used the name 'Republic of China' in countries which adhere to the one-China policy. On 27 April 2018, due to diplomatic pressure from the People's Republic of China, Jordan requested Taiwan to drop 'Republic of China' and 'Taiwan' from name of the office, resulting in the Ministry of Foreign Affairs of the Republic of China changing the name of the office to Taipei Economic and Cultural Office in Jordan.

== See also ==
- Jordan–Taiwan relations
- List of diplomatic missions of Taiwan
- List of diplomatic missions in Jordan
