= Hay knife =

Agricultural hand tool

A hay knife is an agricultural hand tool: a long-bladed knife which may have large rounded serrations on the edge, or a smooth edge used for sawing off sections at the end of a stack or compact pile of hay or silage.

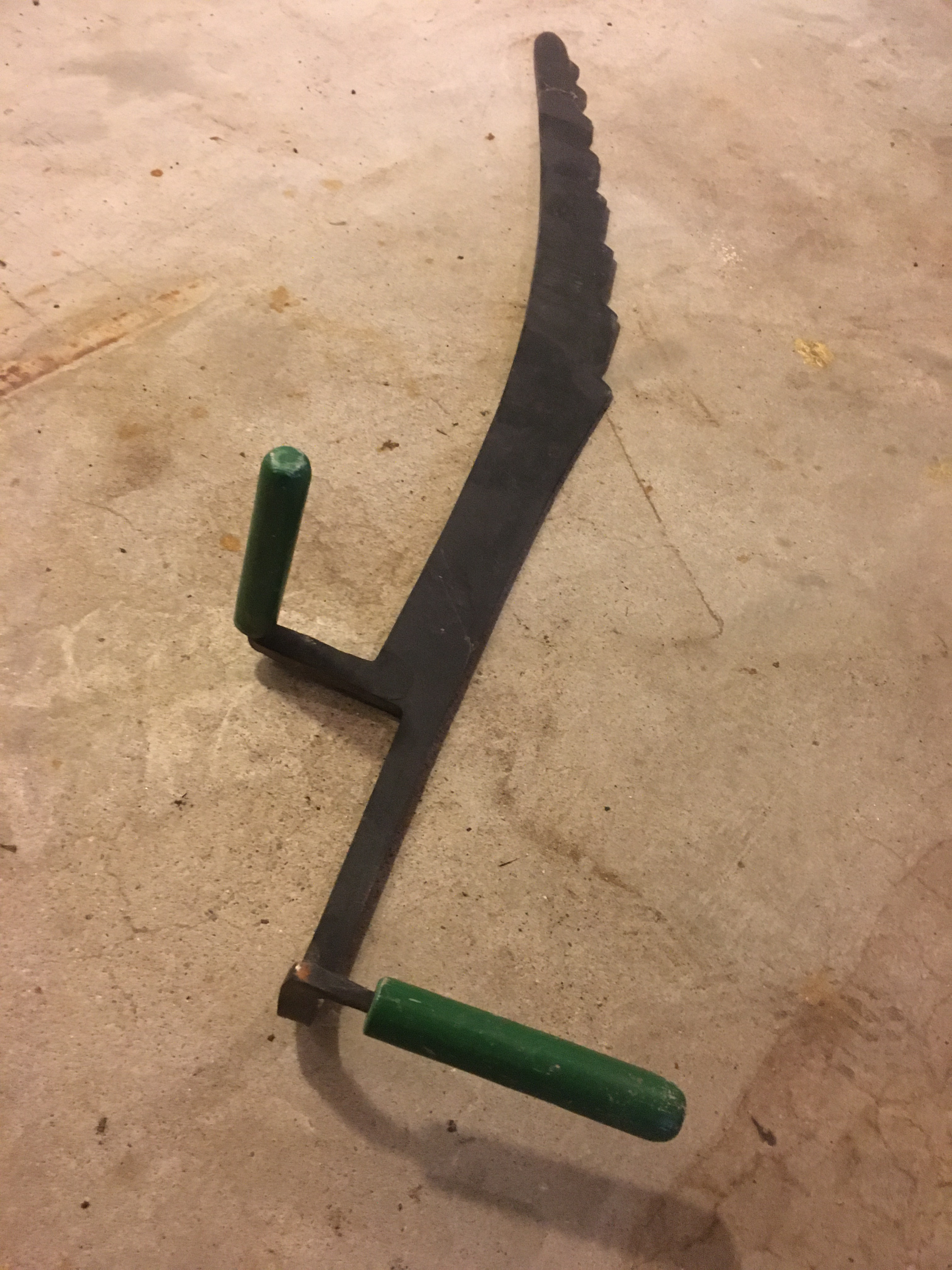
A hay knife with offset handles

Hay knives are needed as hay or silage becomes compacted within a stack: a vertical cut through the intertwined stalks is needed to facilitate removal. The offset handle allows the user to work down a face. Once one section has been removed the worker starts again at the top creating another section to be removed.

== Patents ==
Several patents were issued during the late nineteenth and early twentieth centuries, reflecting widespread use prior to the general adoption of mechanized baling equipment.

U.S. Patent No. 68,536 (1867)
described an improvement in Hay-Knives.
U.S. Patent No. 226,146 (1880)
added circular, sickle-edged cutting elements.
U.S. Patent No. 278,584 (1883)
covered structural improvements.
U.S. Patent No. 1,008,088 (1911)
proposed refinements to blade configuration and cutting action.
