= Narcisse Juneau =

19th century American politician

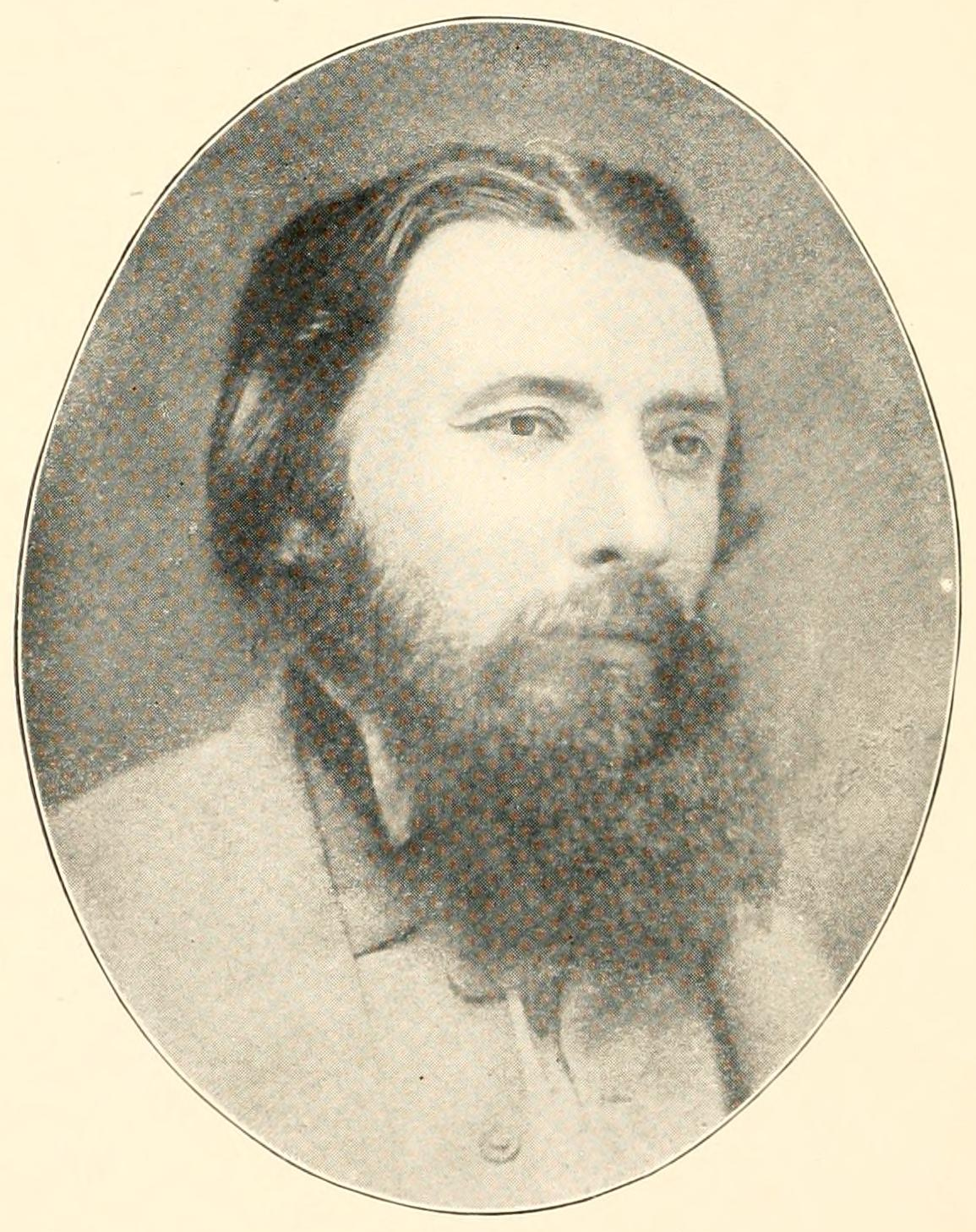
- from Solomon Juneau; a Biography (1916)

Member of the Wisconsin State Assembly
- In office January 4, 1858 – January 3, 1859
- Preceded by: Peter Potter
- Succeeded by: John C. Bishop
- Constituency: Dodge 2nd district
- In office January 1, 1855 – January 7, 1856
- Preceded by: Benjamin F. Barney
- Succeeded by: Benjamin F. Barney
- Constituency: Dodge 1st district

Register of Deeds of Dodge County, Wisconsin
- In office January 1, 1853 – January 1, 1855
- Preceded by: Edwin Giddings
- Succeeded by: Paul Juneau

Personal details
- Born: November 14, 1821 Green Bay, Michigan Territory
- Died: March 26, 1883 (aged 61) Shawnee County, Kansas, U.S.
- Resting place: Mount Calvary Cemetery, Topeka, Kansas
- Party: Democratic
- Spouse: Madeline M. Yott
- Children: 9
- Parents: Solomon Juneau (father); Josette Vieau Juneau (mother)
- Relatives: Paul Juneau (brother); Paul O. Husting (nephew); Bert Husting (nephew)
- Occupation: Farmer, interpreter

Narcisse Mathias Juneau (November 14, 1821 – March 26, 1883) was an American farmer, interpreter, and pioneer of Wisconsin and Kansas. He served two terms in the Wisconsin State Assembly, representing northeast Dodge County. He was a son of Solomon Juneau, the founder of Milwaukee, Wisconsin.

== Biography ==
Narcisse Juneau was born in Green Bay, but raised in what is now the city of Milwaukee. At the time, it was a few small settlements in what was then the Michigan Territory. He received a basic education, and from an early age worked as an assistant and interpreter for his father in the fur trade. His mother was half Menominee Indian, and Narcisse was raised speaking several different Indian languages, including Potawatomi, Menominee, Iroquois, Oneida, Chippewa, and Kickapoo.

He resided in Milwaukee until 1852, when he moved to the town of Theresa, in Dodge County, Wisconsin. He was elected register of deeds of Dodge County in 1852, and was then elected to the Wisconsin State Assembly in 1854 and 1857.

In 1864, he was adopted into the Citizen Potawatomi Nation in Kansas and worked as an interpreter for the tribe. He assisted the tribe's move to Oklahoma (then the Indian Territory) when they sold their land in Kansas. Juneau remained in Kansas with his family, and farmed a plot of land in Shawnee County, Kansas, where he died on March 26, 1883.

== Personal life and family ==
Narcisse Juneau was the eldest son of Solomon Juneau and his wife Josette Vieau Juneau. Solomon Juneau was a fur trader in the Wisconsin Territory and was one of the founders of Milwaukee, having established a settlement known as Juneautown on the land east of the Milwaukee River in 1818. Josette was the daughter of French Canadian fur trader Jacques Vieau, the first white person to permanently settle in Milwaukee.

Wisconsin State Assembly
Preceded by Benjamin F. Barney	Member of the Wisconsin State Assembly from the Dodge 1st district January 1, 1855 – January 7, 1856	Succeeded by Benjamin F. Barney
Preceded by Peter Potter	Member of the Wisconsin State Assembly from the Dodge 2nd district January 4, 1858 – January 3, 1859	Succeeded by John C. Bishop
Political offices
Preceded by Edwin Giddings	Register of Deeds of Dodge County, Wisconsin; January 1, 1853 – January 1, 1855	Succeeded by Paul Juneau
