= Vieau =

Vieau is a surname. Notable people with the surname include:

- Jacques Vieau (1757–1852), French-Canadian fur trader and settler
- Josette Vieau Juneau (1803-1855), Menominee humanitarian
- Shane Vieau, Canadian set decorator
