= Paul Juneau =

American politician (1822–1858)

Member of the Wisconsin State Assembly
- In office January 4, 1858 – August 13, 1858 (died)
- Preceded by: Robert B. Wentworth
- Succeeded by: Waldo Lyon
- Constituency: Dodge 3rd district
- In office January 1, 1849 – January 7, 1850
- Preceded by: Lorenzo Merrill
- Succeeded by: Oscar Hurlbut
- Constituency: Dodge 1st district

Personal details
- Born: April 29, 1822 Juneautown, Michigan Territory
- Died: August 13, 1858 (aged 36) Juneau, Wisconsin, U.S.
- Cause of death: Accidental death
- Resting place: Juneau Cemetery, Juneau
- Party: Democratic
- Spouse: Olive Cylinda Buttles (m. 1848–1858)
- Children: Anna Josette (McGee)^{(b. 1848; died 1910)}; Bertha J. (Dousman)^{(b. 1852; died 1918)}; Marian (King)^{(b. 1854; died 1921)}
- Parents: Solomon Juneau (father); Josette Vieau Juneau (mother)
- Relatives: Narcisse Juneau (brother); Paul O. Husting (nephew); Bert Husting (nephew)

Paul Juneau (April 29, 1822 – August 13, 1858) was an American businessman, politician, and Wisconsin pioneer. He served two terms in the Wisconsin State Assembly, representing Dodge County during the 1849 and 1858 terms. He was the namesake of Juneau, Wisconsin.

His father was Solomon Juneau, one of the founders of Milwaukee, Wisconsin. His brother, Narcisse Juneau was also a notable Wisconsin pioneer and politician.

== Background and civic life ==
He was born in a log cabin in Milwaukee April 29, 1822, son of Solomon Juneau (a French-Canadian fur trader, co-founder and first mayor of that city) and his wife Josette, a mixed-blood member of the Menominee nation; and was recorded as a mixed-blood member of that tribe. He attended school in Milwaukee, and later in Detroit, Michigan Territory. He assisted his father in the fur trade, acting as an interpreter, since he spoke both Menominee and English as well as French. By 1843, he was an official of Milwaukee's first St. Patrick's Day parade, of which his father was head marshal. On January 23, 1844, he was appointed deputy registrar of deeds for Milwaukee by his father. He was a notary public, and advertised that "He can always be found at the office of the Register of Deeds." He was elected a second lieutenant of the City Guards militia of Milwaukee on September 21, 1844. In late 1844, Solomon Juneau moved his household to Dodge County, founding the village of Theresa (which Solomon had already platted, and which was named after Solomon's mother [Marie-]Thérèse); but as late as March 1847 Paul and his father were still participating in political meetings in Milwaukee. In November 1847, however, it was announced that Paul had been appointed as a notary for Dodge County.

== Elected office ==
The first election in the Township of Theresa was held April 4, 1848, at the home of Narcisse or Narcissus M. Juneau, Paul's brother. Forty-three votes were cast. The first town clerk elected was Narcisse; among the three supervisors (equivalent to a city council member) was Paul Juneau. In August 1848 the post office previously in the Township of Theresa was moved into the village of Theresa, and Paul Juneau was appointed postmaster; but he resigned the following year and was replaced by his brother Narcisse.

He was first elected to the Assembly later in 1848 for the 1849 session (2nd Wisconsin Legislature), at which time his profession was reported as land agent. His district included the towns of Burnett, Chester, LeRoy and Williamstown.

Although he attended the 1849 state Democratic convention, he ran for County Register of Deeds in 1850 as an independent candidate.

In 1854, Juneau was elected county register of deeds (succeeding Narcisse in that office). He was elected to the Assembly again as a Democrat from what was now the 3rd Dodge County district (the Towns of Rubicon, Hustisford and Oak Grove) for the 1858 session (11th Wisconsin Legislature), succeeding Robert B. Wentworth, a Republican and was assigned to the standing committee on privileges and elections. Narcisse was elected in the same election to represent the neighboring district. Narcisse was living in the town of Juneau, which had renamed itself in honor of Paul Juneau.

== Death ==
In August 1858, Juneau was accidentally shot by a young man during a pistol target practice session near the courthouse in Juneau, dying on August 13. He was succeeded for the Assembly's 1859 session by Waldo Lyon, a Republican.
