= Langenfeld =

Langenfeld may refer to:

== Germany ==
- Langenfeld, Bavaria, in the Neustadt (Aisch)-Bad Windsheim district of Mittelfranken, Bavaria
- Langenfeld, Mayen-Koblenz, in the Mayen-Koblenz district of Rhineland-Palatinate
- Langenfeld, Rhineland, in the Mettmann district of North Rhine-Westphalia

== Poland ==
- Langenfeld the former German name of Długoszyn, a village in Sulęcin County, Lubusz Voivodeship, in western Poland.

== Romania ==
- Câmpulung la Tisa, formerly Langenfeld, a commune in Maramureș

== People ==
- Christine Langenfeld (born 1962), German jurist and judge
- Fred Langenfeld (1908–1954), French cinematographer
- Megan Langenfeld (born 1988), American softball player and coach
- Peter Langenfeld (1837–?), American politician and businessman
- Witold Langenfeld (1896–1968), Polish military officer and intelligence operative

== See also ==
- Lengenfeld near Zwickau in Saxony, Germany
