= Mitchell Park Horticultural Conservatory =

Horticultural conservatory in Milwaukee, Wisconsin, U.S.

- Mitchell Park Domes
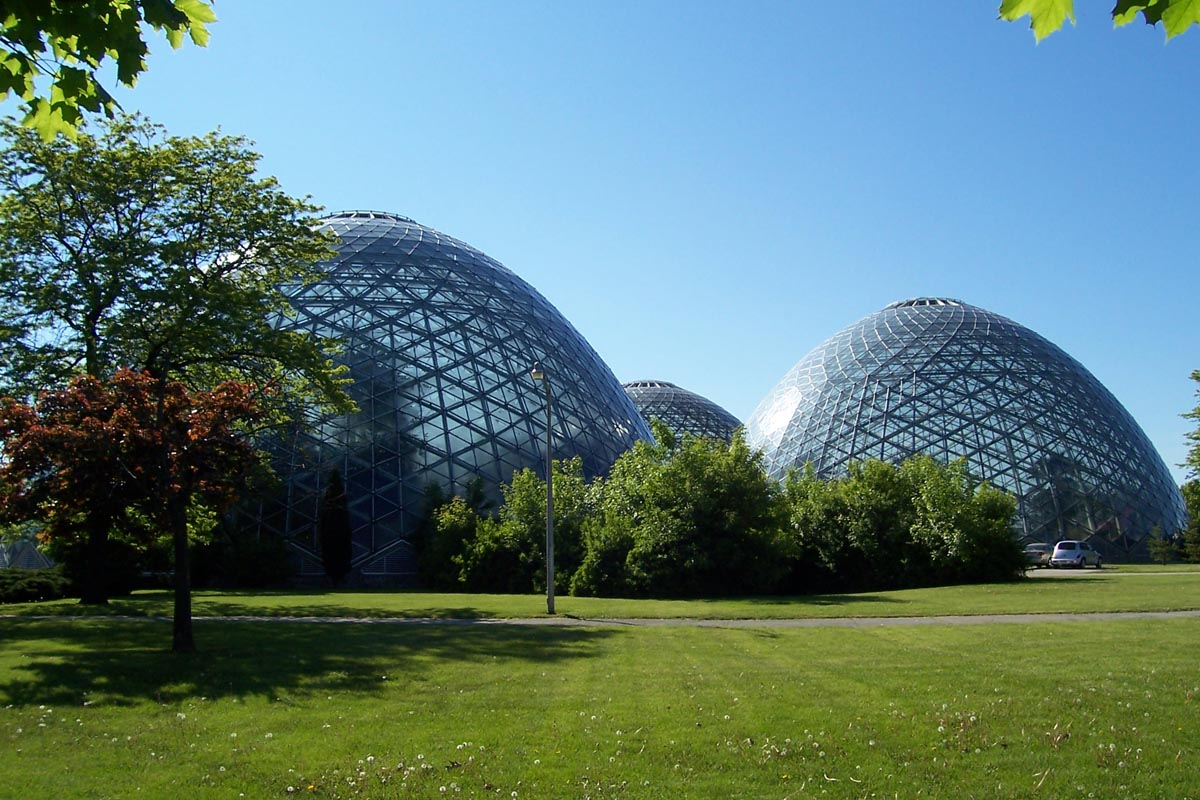
- The Mitchell Park Horticultural Conservatory in 2005
- Interactive map of Mitchell Park Horticultural Conservatory
- Type: Public
- Location: Milwaukee, Wisconsin, U.S.
- Coordinates: 43°01′35″N 87°56′45″W
- Area: 45,000 square feet (4,200 m^{2})
- Created: 1964
- Visitors: 200,000+
- Species: 1,800
- Public transit: MCTS
- Website: https://www.mitchellparkdomes.com

Mitchell Park Horticultural Conservatory (Mitchell Park Domes or The Domes) is a conservatory located at Mitchell Park in Milwaukee, Wisconsin, United States. The conservatory opened in 1964 following five years of construction. It is owned and operated by the Milwaukee County Park System, and replaced the original Milwaukee Conservatory which stood from 1898 to 1955. The three domes display a large variety of plant life.

== History ==
The Mitchell Park Horticultural Conservatory was preceded by the former Milwaukee Conservatory. The conservatory opened in 1898 and was demolished in 1955 to make way for the current conservatory. Construction began in 1959 and was completed in 1964. The conservatory opened as the Mitchell Park Horticultural Conservatory in 1964. The Floral Show Dome, Tropical Dome, and Desert Domes were completed in 1964, 1966, and 1967 respectively.

The conservatory closed in June 2008 for a major restoration project following multiple cracked glass panels. Additionally the lobby was remodeled. The conservatory officially opened in October 2008. Beginning February 8, 2016, the Mitchell Park Domes were closed because of structural concerns. By the end of 2016, repairs allowed all three domes to be reopened to the public. In 2017, a greenhouse complex at the rear of the Conservatory was opened to replace previous off-site facilities.

In 2019, after years of deterioration and falling concrete debris, Gallagher Museum Services was hired to do a study of the three domes. That firm recommended demolition of the domes, at an estimated cost of 300 million dollars. This recommendation has been rebuked by the National Trust for Historic Preservation and Milwaukee County Supervisor Jason Haas said it has no impact on the future of the domes. In November 2024, plans were approved for renovations.

== Domes ==
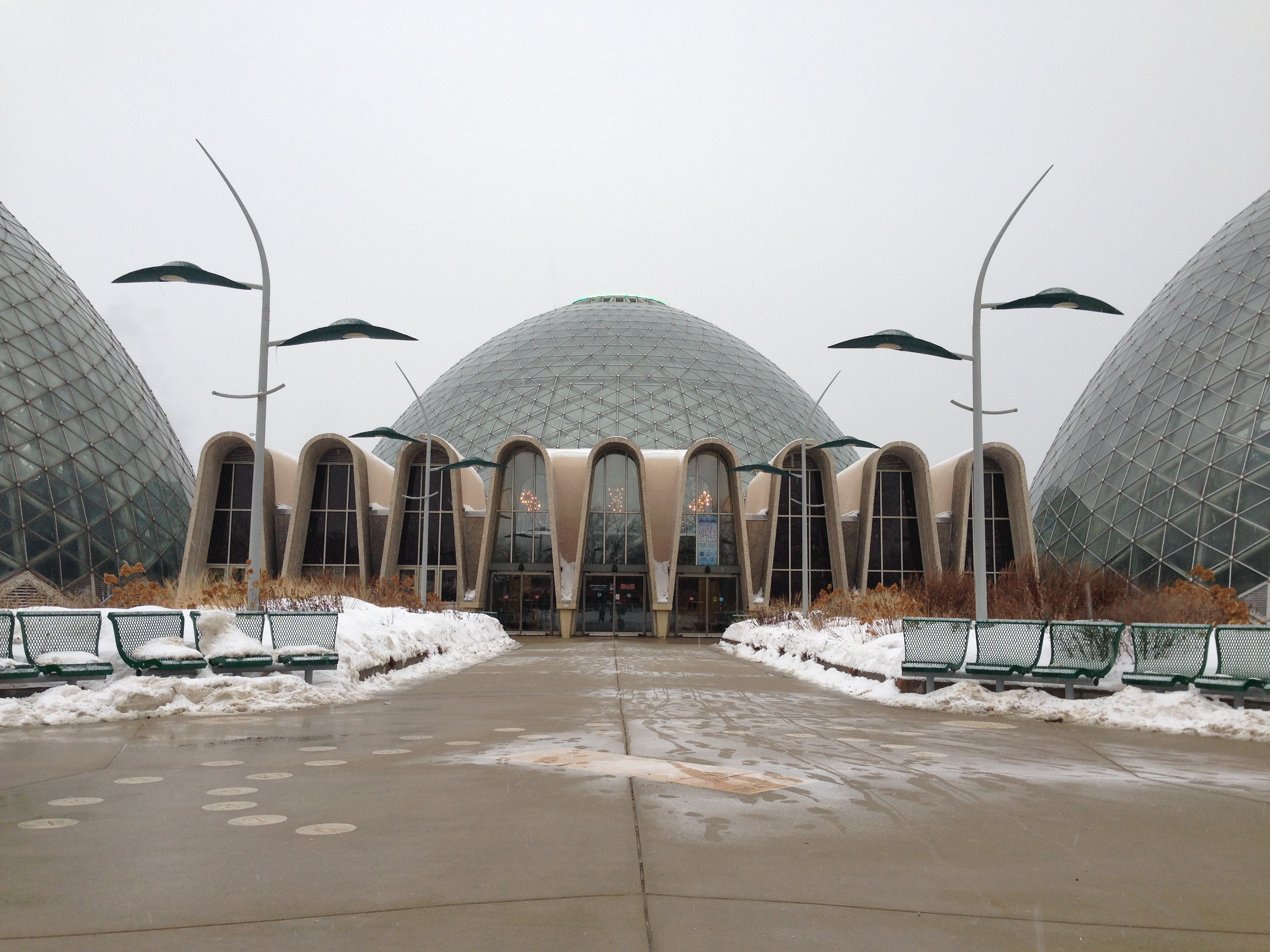
The entrance to the domes

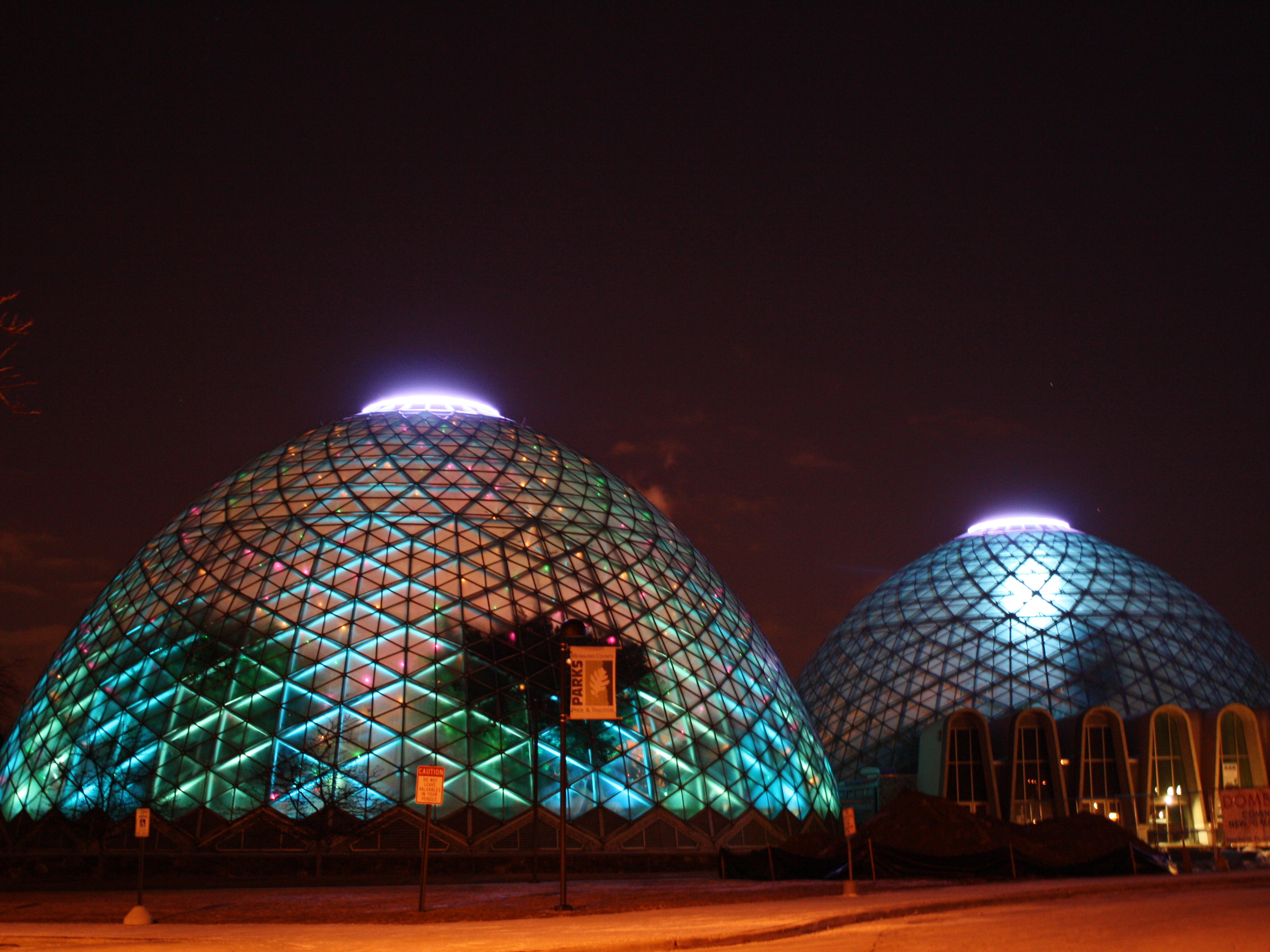
The domes at night

Each of the three domes maintains a distinct climate and setting for the exposition of its contents.

=== Floral Show Dome ===
The Floral Show Dome opened in December 1964. It hosts four seasonal shows and one holiday exhibit held annually in December for visitors to enjoy. Each show has a theme chosen based on cultural (such as Japanese, German and French), literary (Charles Dickens' A Christmas Carol), or historical interest (Colonial Williamsburg and the History of Herb Gardening, for example). In most recent years, the Winter Show has featured an extensive garden railway display put on with the cooperation of many Wisconsin Model Railroad club members. The garden railway has become one of the most popular displays during the year and is one of the largest such indoor displays in the Midwest.

=== Tropical Dome ===
The Tropical Dome opened in February 1966. The Tropical Dome features nearly 1,000 species of plants, including many nutritionally important fruit bearing plants such as banana, papaya, ackee, guava, avocado, and cacao. One of the cacao trees is over 60 years old and was transplanted from the old Conservatory. It still sets fruit each year. Hardwoods include big-leaf, little-leaf, and African mahoganies, ebony and lignum vitae. A rare curare vine can also be found growing.

The dome is seasonally decorated with a wide variety of blooming plants, including a number of award-winning orchids. The center of the Dome is dominated by a large kapok tree. It is one of the tallest trees under glass. At one time, its height was up to 95 feet (29 m) high, but is now kept at a more manageable 60 feet (18 m). In addition to the plants, the Tropical Dome is home to a number of colorful birds.

=== Desert Dome ===
The Desert Dome opened in November 1967. It displays a wide variety of plants from the Americas and Africa. The American section contains a large number of plants native to the Sonoran Desert, including shrubs, trees, annuals and bulbs, as well as the familiar cacti. The African section has aloes, crassulas, euphorbias, along with the unusual Welwitschia plant, which has only two continuously growing leaves and may live for over a thousand years.

Another section hosts the succulent flora of Madagascar and includes plants such as Euphorbia, Pachypodium, Adenia, Didierea, Alluaudia, and Operculicarya. Many of them were grown from seed obtained in Madagascar. This area was formally dedicated on September 8, 1984 by Leon Rajaobelina, the Ambassador from Madagascar.

In August 2006, an Encephalartos ferox produced a double red-colored cone. It is only the second time in over 30 years this has happened. The cones are expected to last several months, most likely until spring brings warmer weather.

== Mitchell Park ==
Mitchell Park is one of the six original Milwaukee parks created by the first park commission. It occupies a spot in the Clarke Square neighborhood on the south side of Milwaukee, starting with a core of 5 acres (20,000 m^{2}) that was donated by John L. Mitchell, father of General Billy Mitchell and named for the donor. Further donations brought the total area to just over 60 acres (240,000 m^{2}).

Also found on park grounds, at a bluff overlooking the Menomonee Valley, is a monument marking the site of an early trading post built by Jacques Vieau. Vieau was a settler and fur trader who later became father-in-law to Milwaukee founder Solomon Juneau. Just south of the Conservatory was the site of extensive formal gardens and a sunken water feature. Opened in 1904, it was removed in the late 1980s due to budget cuts.

== Photo gallery ==
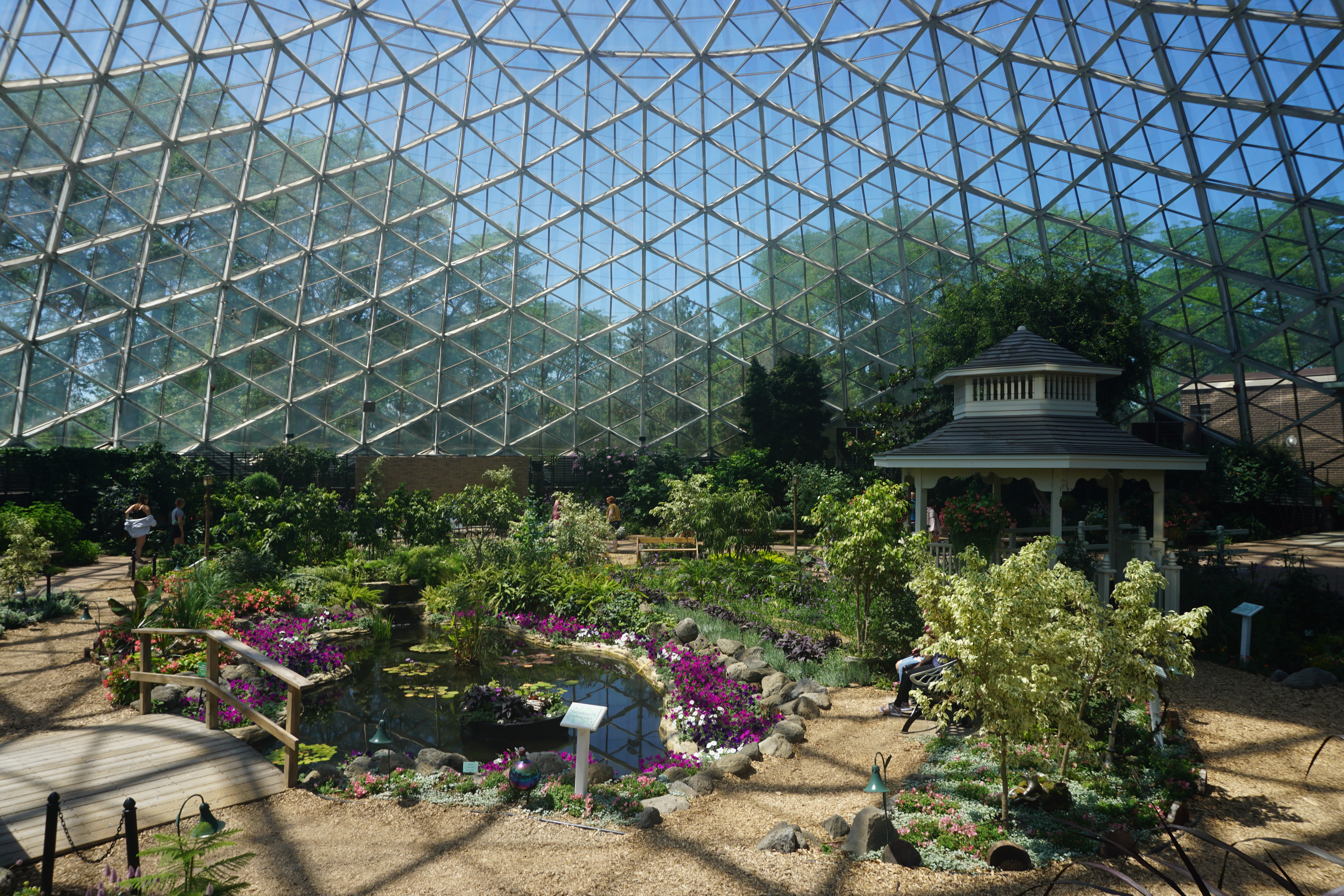
View from within the Floral Show Dome

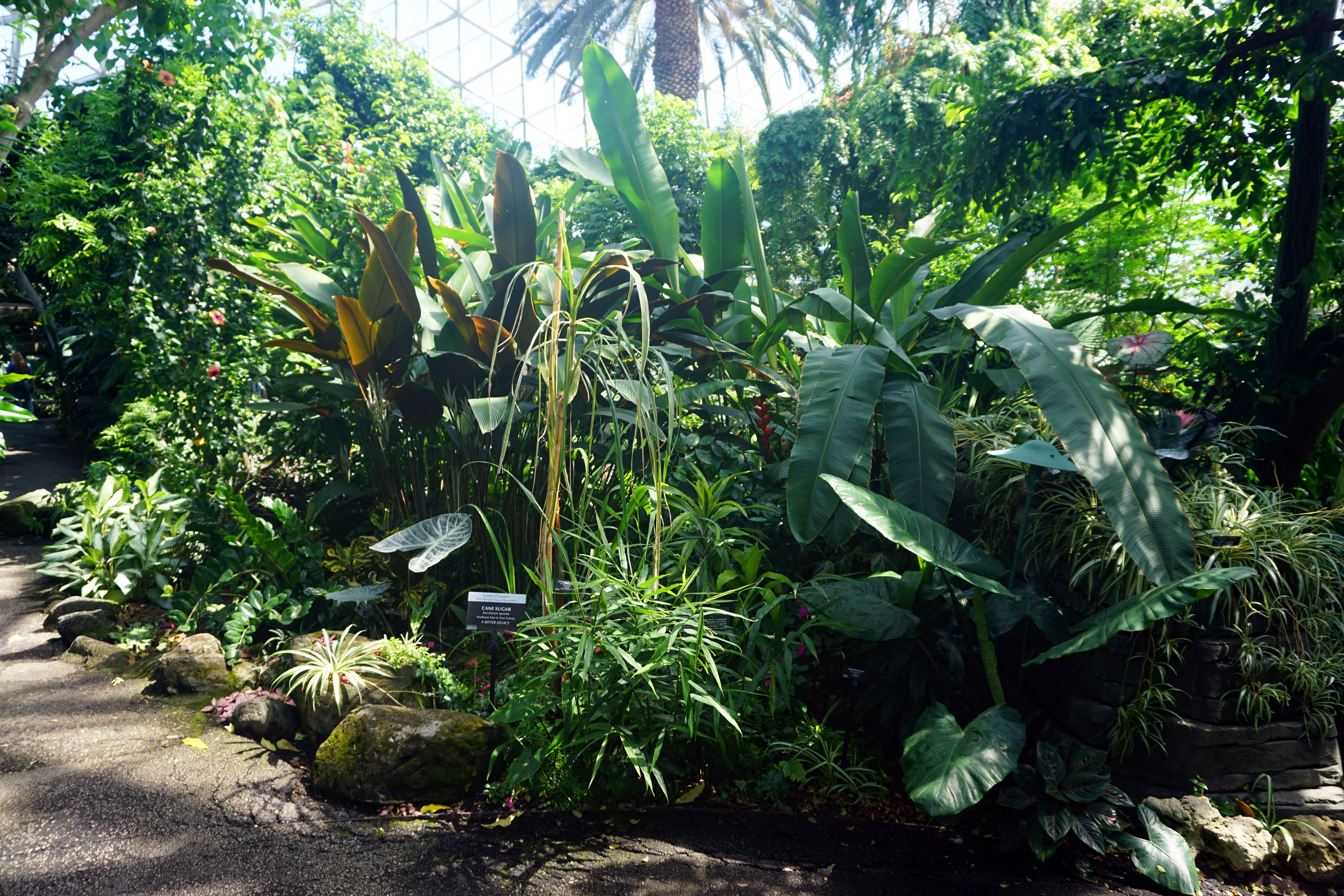
Inside the Tropical Dome

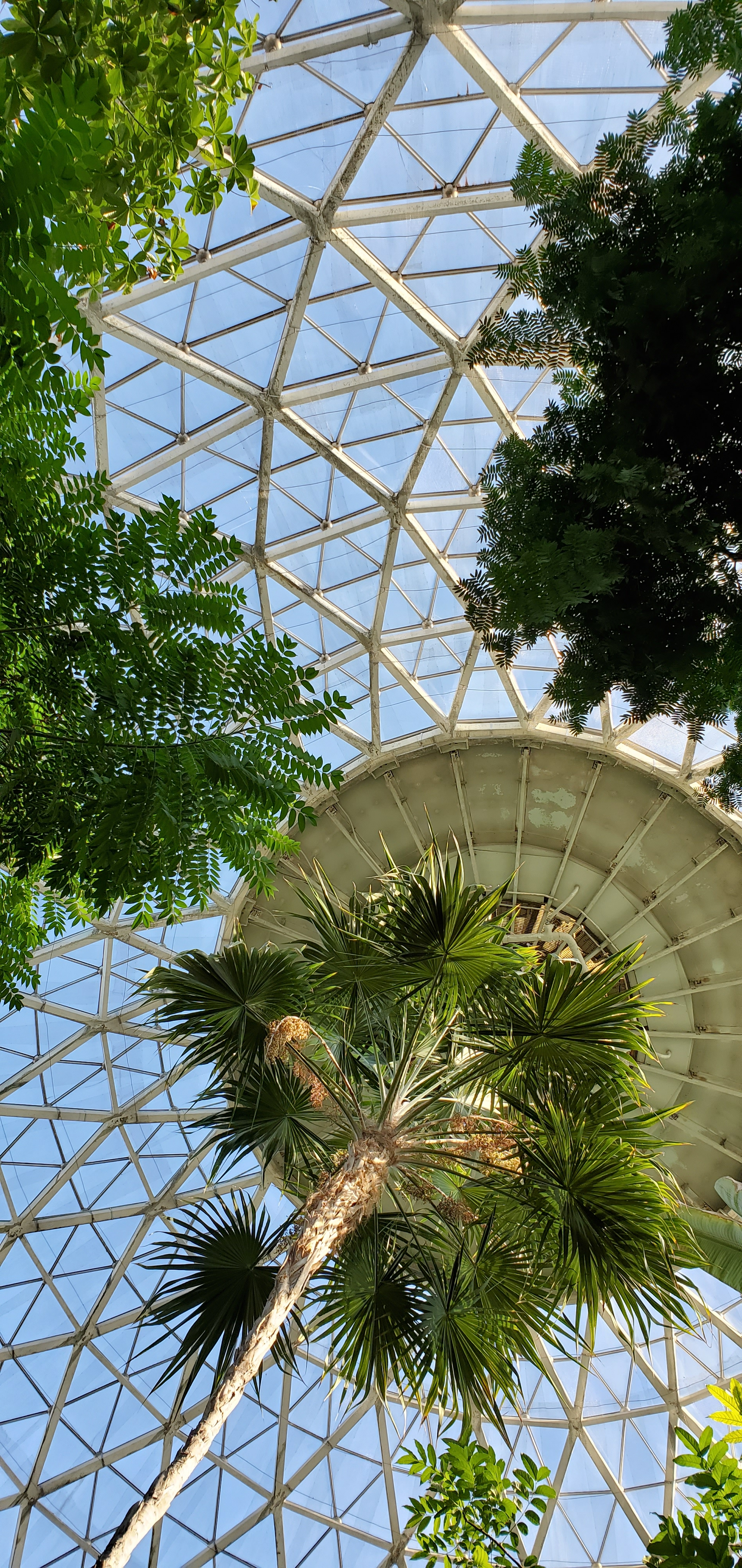
Gazing upward in the Tropical Dome

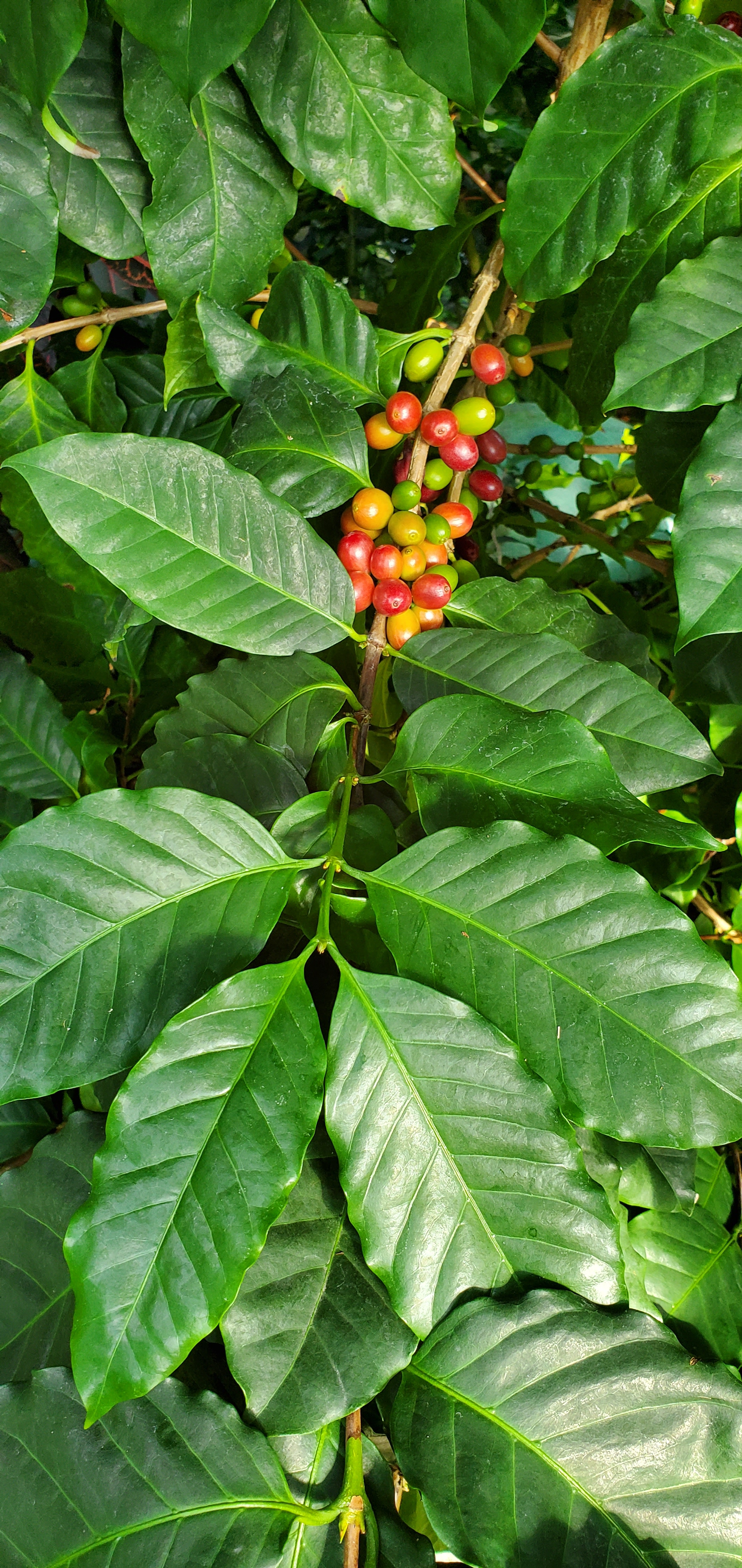
A coffee plant in the Tropical Dome

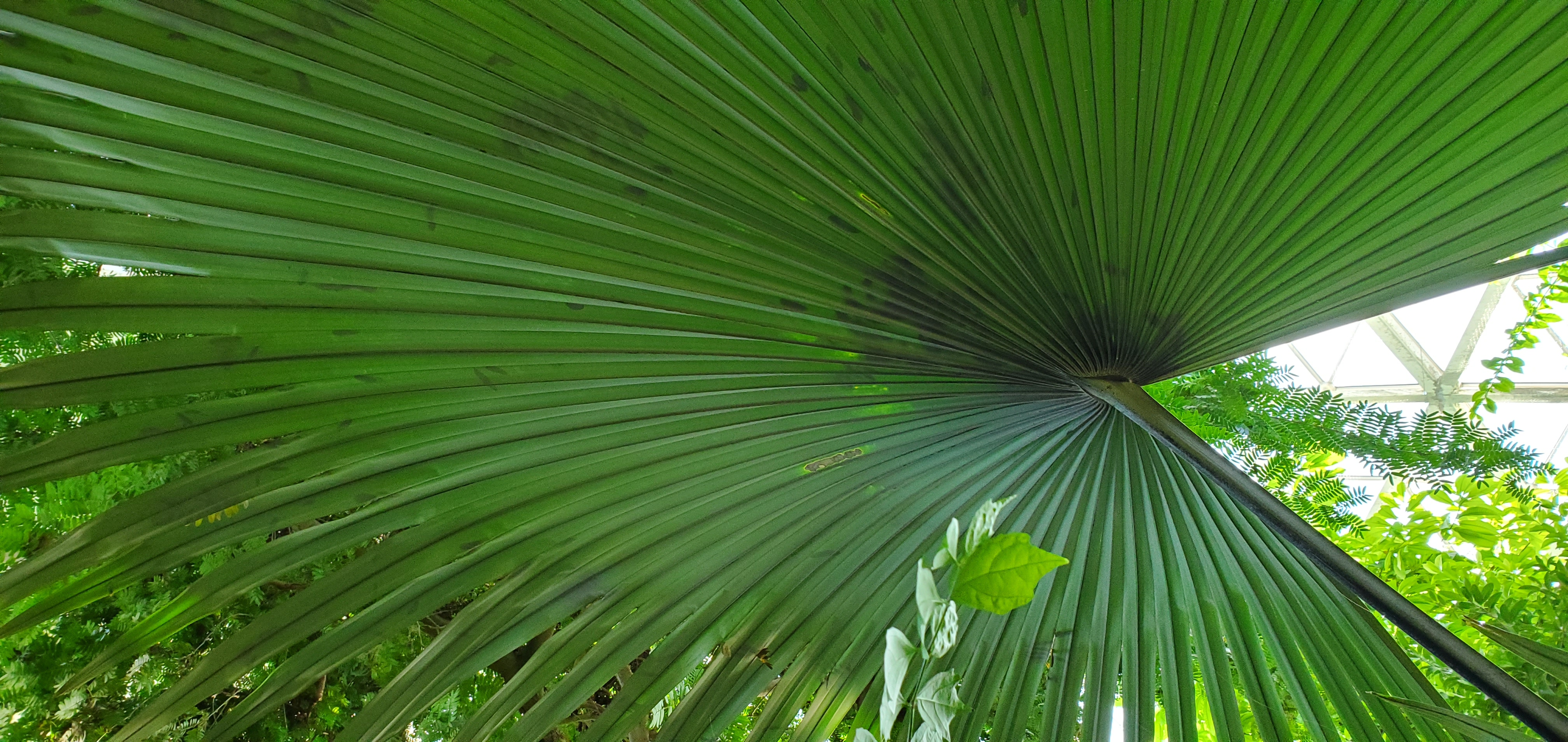
An Elephant Palm in the Tropical Dome

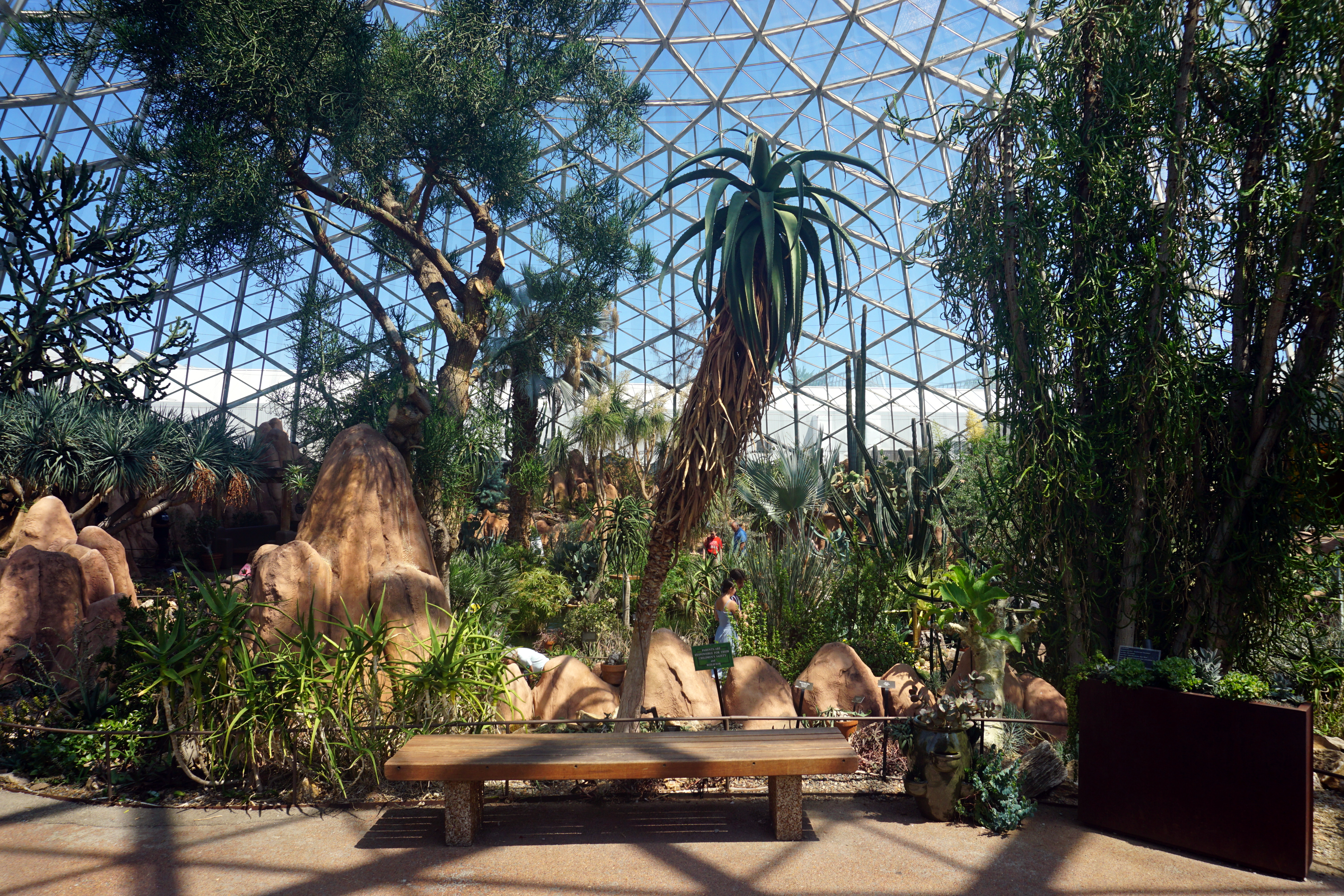
A view of the Desert Dome

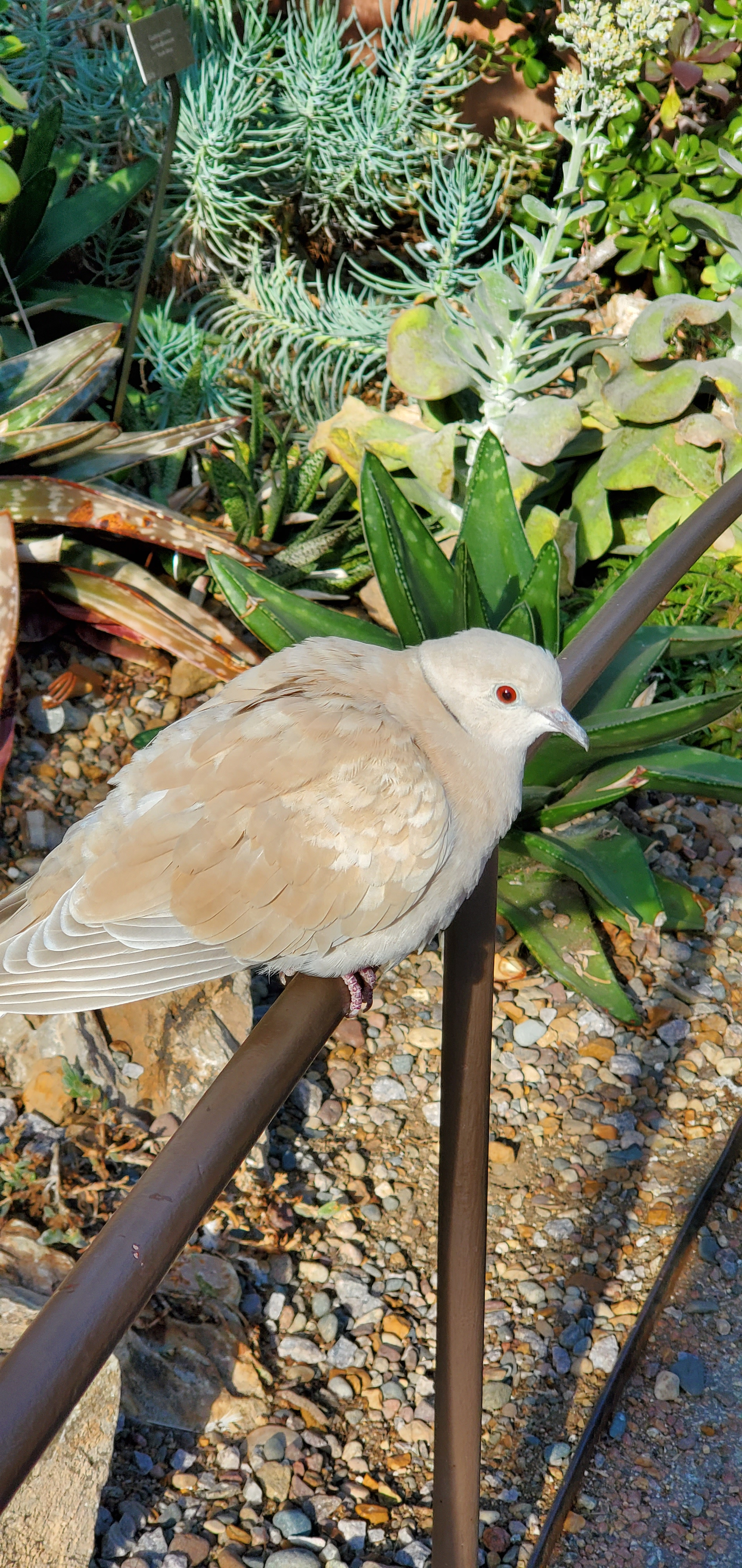
One of the Mexican Doves in the Desert Dome

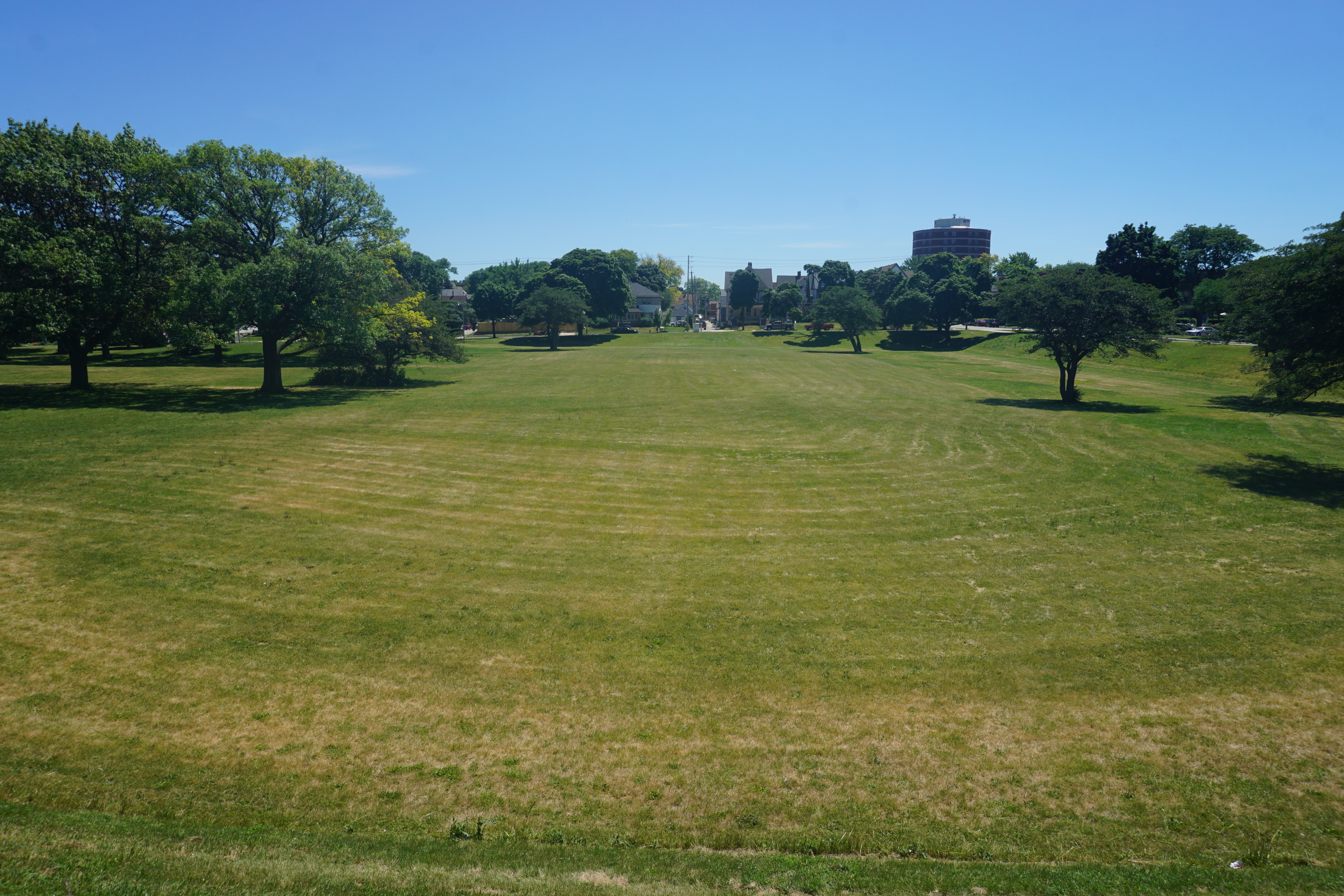
Former sunken gardens

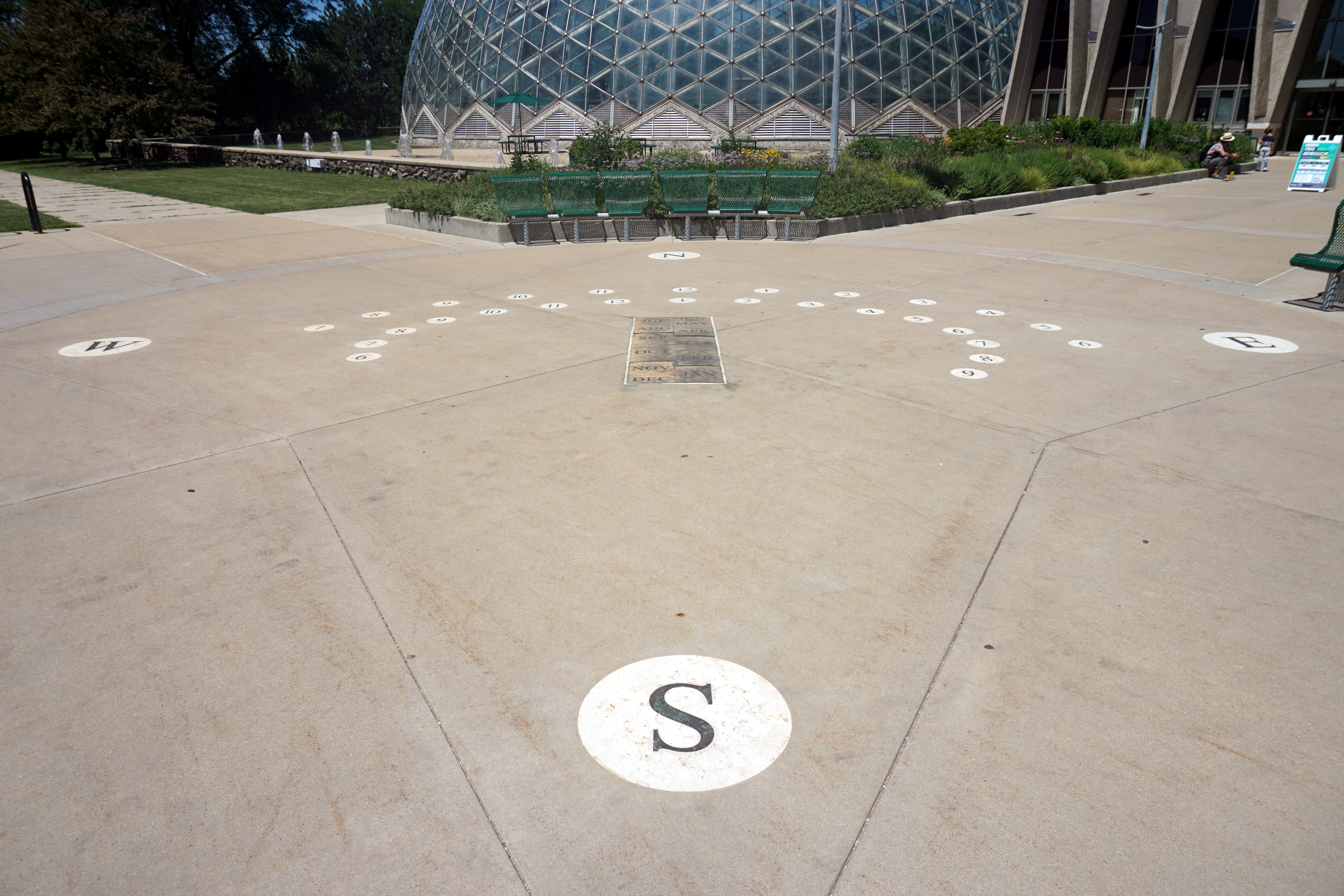
Human gnomon analemmatic sundial

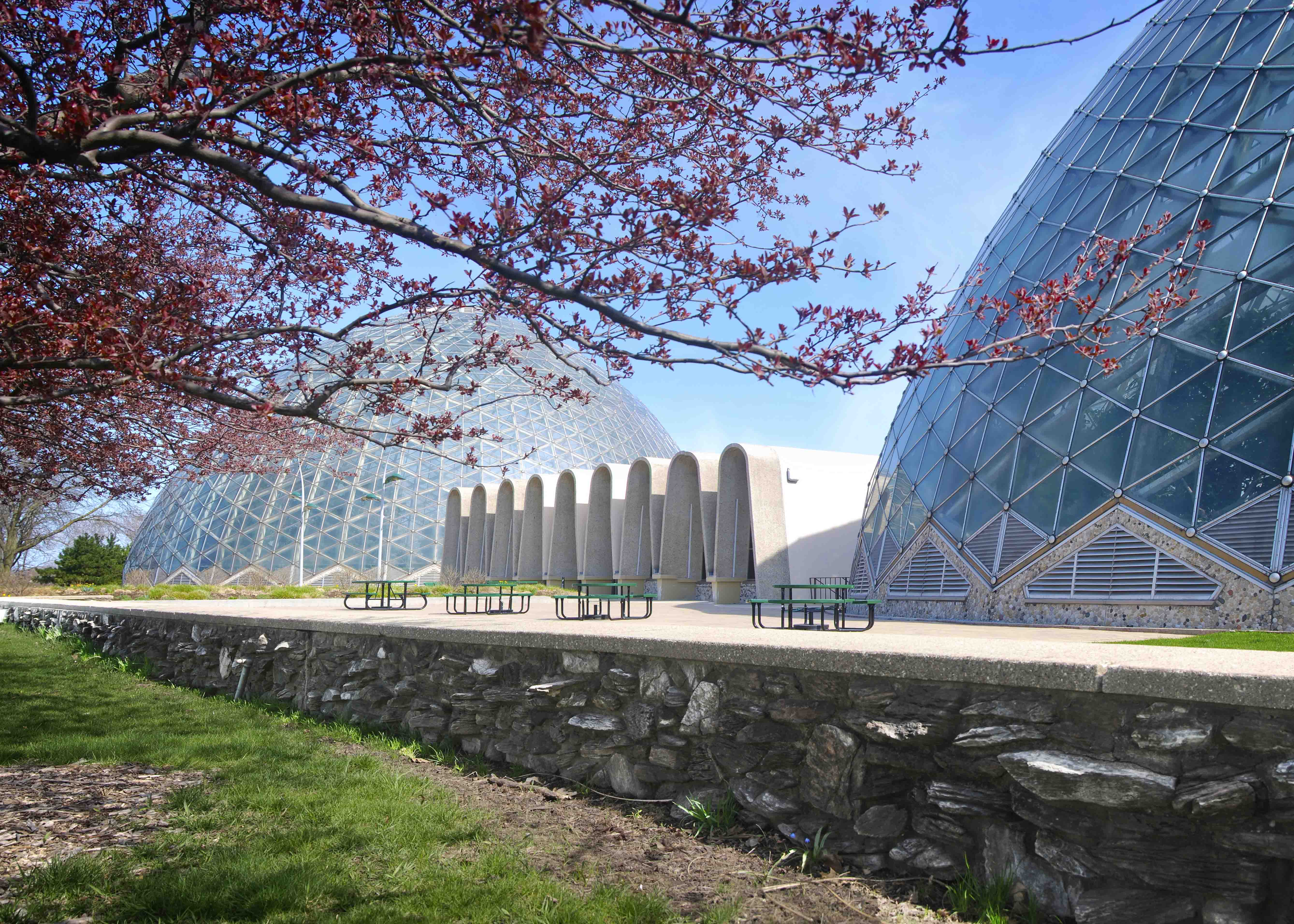
Outside picnic areas

== See also ==
- Biosphere 2
- List of botanical gardens and arboretums in Wisconsin
