= 2006 Falk Corporation explosion =

Industrial accident in Milwaukee, Wisconsin

Coordinates: 43°01′41″N 87°57′08″W

- Date: December 6, 2006; 19 years ago
- Location: Menomonee Valley, Milwaukee, Wisconsin, U.S.
- Deaths: 3
- Injuries: 47

The Falk Corporation explosion refers to a large and fatal propane gas explosion at a Falk Corporation building in the industrial Menomonee River Valley neighborhood of Milwaukee, Wisconsin on December 6, 2006. Three people were killed and forty-seven others injured. Cars were reportedly flipped through the air and debris scattered over several blocks. An investigation of the cause of the disaster uncovered leaks in a pipe running below the building, which supplied propane to the heating system for the complex. Several parties involved in the explosion have launched legal action in connection to the accident.

== Falk Corporation ==
The Falk Corporation manufactures large industrial gears, couplings, chains, bearings and other industrial components and equipment. Located in the Menomonee River Valley in Milwaukee, Wisconsin, it is owned by Rexnord. The complex is more than 61 acres (250,000 m^{2}), and has 1,500,000 square feet (140,000 m^{2}) of buildings. 600 people were inside the complex at the time of the explosion. The building that exploded was located in one corner of the complex. The building that housed the propane tanks was two separate structures joined together. One of the buildings was used as a warehouse for storing components used in the manufacturing process, and was called the Annex. The other building, called the 2-2 building, was a maintenance facility. The two buildings between them housed six propane tanks and covered 50,000 square feet (5,000 m^{2}).

=== Previous disasters involving the Falk Corporation ===
The company was founded in 1856 as a brewery and the original plant was destroyed by fire. Three years later, the replacement brew house, grain elevator, malt house and refrigerator building were destroyed by a second fire. The remains of the business were sold, but one of the family's youngest sons rented part of the complex back and began a manufacturing business, and by 1900 the current compound had been constructed. In 1917 the Menomonee River overflowed its banks, filling the plant with at least 18 inches (460 mm) of muddy water. Cleanup operations took several weeks. During another flood in 1960 waters rose so fast that 75 workers were stranded and required rescue. Recovery operations took several weeks. The Occupational Safety and Health Administration investigated four complaints in the ten years prior to the explosion, but none involved the propane systems.

== Explosion and emergency response ==
Before the explosion, most of the workers had evacuated the building. Police Chief Nannette Hegerty stated that an evacuation had begun 10 to 14 minutes before the explosion. According to reports by the Milwaukee Journal Sentinel, a Falk spokeswoman stated that the evacuation was limited to the area near a propane leak. The Journal's report also stated that a man said that he smelled gas about thirty minutes before the explosion occurred. Another worker reported a propane leak, and shut off the tank and issued a warning, but could still smell the gas. The Journal interviewed six employees who said they were never formally evacuated because it would have led them through the Annex building.

At 8:07 A.M. Central time the entirety of the dual building exploded. The explosion happened while workers were performing a test to switch to a back-up system heating system which used propane instead of gas to heat the facility.

The explosion killed three people and injured 47. It was later discovered that the people who were killed were attempting to repair the leak. Debris landed several blocks away from the site of the explosion and cars were hurled through the air by the force of the blast. The explosion caused widespread damage to an area approximately the size of two football fields. The Department of Neighborhood Services later carried out an inspection of the site; they discovered that buildings within a radius of approximately 500 feet (150 m) had sustained heavy damage, such as torn-off roofs and collapsed walls. Roughly thirty separate vehicles were destroyed in the blast.

The nearest fire station was just six blocks away. Firefighters were initially alerted by the force of the explosion buckling the fire station door. Originally it was thought that a car had struck the fire station, but when firefighters went outside, they quickly realized this was not the case. One of the drivers soon spotted smoke and a fire engine and a paramedic unit were dispatched to go to this smoke. These vehicles were the first rescuers on the scene and arrived just three minutes, forty seconds after the initial explosion. They immediately sent for the department's heavy urban rescue team. Ultimately, 125 firefighters in 34 vehicles, 52 police officers, multiple private ambulances and the American Red Cross all helped at the scene, which was classed by the fire service as a five-alarm emergency.

== Investigation ==
A full investigation was launched into the accident by several government agencies, as well as legal representatives for the families of the deceased. The investigation determined that the leak was initially discovered by employees of the contractor J.M. Brennan Inc., who helped maintain plumbing, heating, air conditioning and ventilation equipment at the plant. These four employees noticed propane gas pooling as Falk employees started the propane system, which the factory uses as a backup fuel supply when natural gas is shut down during peak demand. These employees alerted other workers to the problem. There had been testing conducted on the system for a full 40 minutes prior to the explosion. It is also thought the leak came from an underground pipe that ran from propane tanks to the propane/air mixers, which convert the liquid propane into gaseous form, so that it is in a form usable by the boilers. This is backed up by the discovery of a small pocket of gas trapped below asphalt directly below the Annex building. Pressure testing of the pipe using nitrogen has since confirmed it was leaking. Subsequent excavation showed it had two separate leaks; Metallurgists have examined the damaged sections of pipeline and determined that the pipe corroded. Falk's evacuation procedure will also feature prominently in the investigation.

Based on one person's account, Rexnord accused J.M. Brennan employees of discouraging the evacuation. J.M. Brennan has adamantly denied this. Although they did not design it or install the entire system, J.M. Brennan acknowledged they installed parts of the system, including the pipeline, across 1962-1963. The case settled out of court. Falk also had a fatal explosion in 1964 which killed one person and damaged a car almost a mile from ground zero. Attorney Robert Habush, representing the families, says the line was installed by Brennan, in 1988.

== Legal action ==
Although workers compensation laws deny workers the right to sue their employer, it is possible for them to sue a related third party. Within a week of the explosion Williams Bailey, a law firm based in Houston, Texas, placed half-page advertisements in a local newspaper. The adverts read "Were you seriously injured in last week's explosion?", and directed potential clients to the company website. The advert also claims that the firm has extensive experience in explosion-related cases. Fran Deisinger, director of the Milwaukee Bar Association, said of the ad "It's a little disconcerting because it's such a terrible situation here that I think it probably rubs everybody a little wrong", adding that although he believed the ad to be in poor taste, it didn't breach any rules for lawyer advertising. Although it is unclear whether any workers contacted Williams Bailey, it is known that at least one injured man, and the families of the deceased, have hired personal injury lawyer Bob Habush to represent them, who once before worked on a high-profile industrial case when three people died as a result of a crane collapse in 1991. On February 7, 2007, he launched a suit against Brennan based on these allegations. J.M. Brennan responded with the following statement: "We are proud of our employees and the response they took in response to the explosion. And we're confident that the results of the official investigation will show that J.M. Brennan's work was reasonable and did not contribute to the cause of the explosion." The suit was settled out of court.

== Aftermath ==
In the immediate aftermath of the explosion, Falk was forced to outsource some parts of the production process to other manufacturers, and are continuing to send regular updates of work in progress to customers, including emailing pictures of the products, which are made to order, as they are built. A fund was set up for victims of the explosion. Rexnord made an initial donation of $100,000; by December 2006, the fund had topped $325,000. A separate fund was also set up for the young children of one of the deceased. The company had started to ship finished products again by December 20. By January 10, all 750 Falk Corporation employees had returned to work. The company intends to rebuild on the site. The explosion has, to date, cost Rexnord over $40 million in damage and lost sales. The company is insured for up to $2 billion per incident. When Christmas came, the Salvation Army donated toys to Falk employees for their children, to help with the cost of Christmas at a time when the families were still very distressed. Milwaukee's state representative, Pedro Colón, has said that there were no laws in Wisconsin requiring the inspection of propane tanks, and is now pushing for adoption of such laws. In October 2008, the lawsuit went to trial in Milwaukee. After four weeks of trial, Rexnord was found to be primarily at fault for the explosion and J.M. Brennan was not liable for any of the damages.
