= Menomonee Valley =

Human settlement in Milwaukee, Wisconsin, United States of America

Coordinates: 43.032750°N 87.932990°W

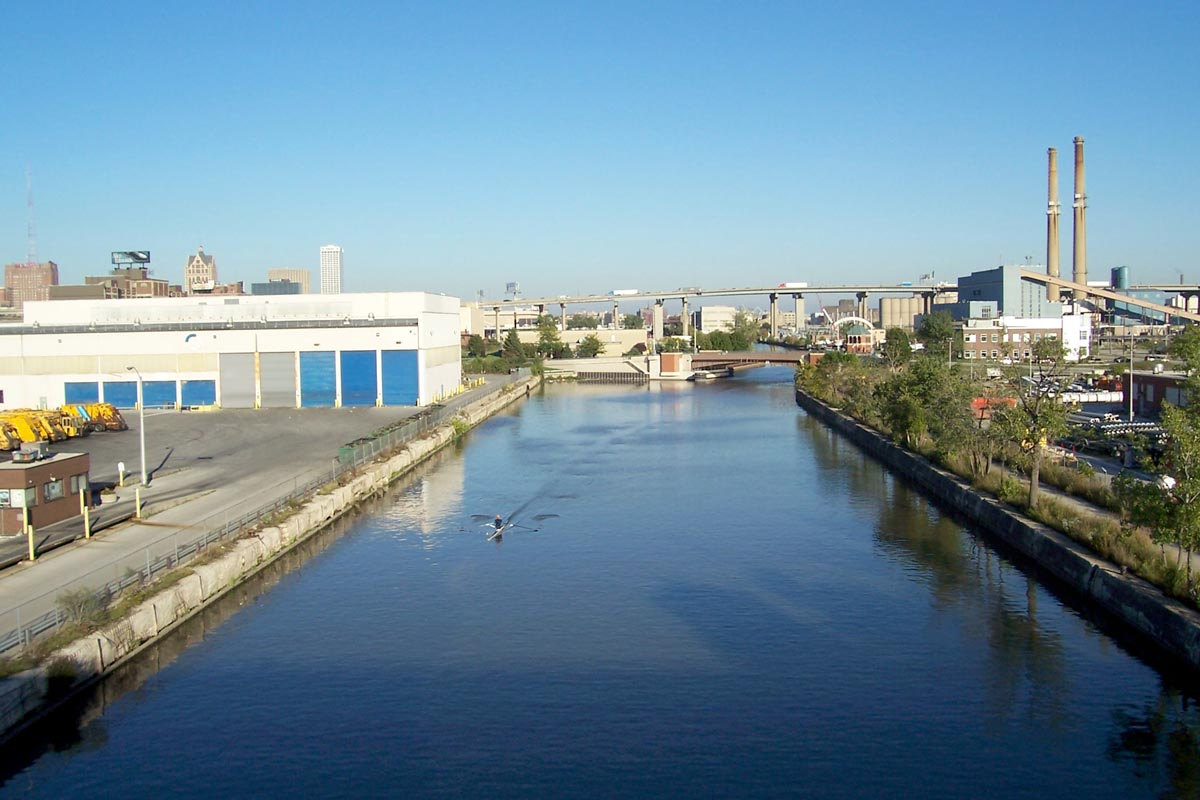
Menomonee River

The Menomonee Valley or Menomonee River Valley is a U-shaped land formation along the southern bend of the Menomonee River in Milwaukee, Wisconsin. Because of its easy access to Lake Michigan and other waterways, the neighborhood has historically been home to the city's stockyards, rendering plants, shipping, and other heavy industry. It was also a primary source of pollution for the river.

Glacial meltwater formed the Menomonee Valley over 10,000 years ago when the Lake Michigan Lobe of the Wisconsin Glaciation retreated and eroded a swath four miles (6 km) long and half of a mile wide. Today, it is roughly bounded by the 6th Street Viaduct near the river confluence and Miller Park stadium to the west. The valley effectively cuts Milwaukee in half, limiting access to a handful of viaducts that span the chasm.

With a historically predominant white south side and black near north side, the valley has been perceived as a social and racial divide during times of civil unrest. In the 1960s, Father James Groppi organized protests against segregation in Milwaukee and led a number of fair housing marches across this symbolic divide. The 16th Street Viaduct has since been renamed in his honor.

== History ==
=== Early settlers ===
Abundant wild rice once grew in the marshland of the confluence and along the shores of the river, which the Menomonee (also spelled Menominee) Indians named for its "good seed." These wetlands provided them with the staples of life and allowed for access further inland. Archaeologist Charles Brown later identified five settlements along the valley rim. Another fourteen archaeological points of interest have since been marked within the valley based on historical accounts, but it is unlikely that anything would be found because of improvements. By the 19th century, displaced Potawatomi were the primary residents.

Missionary Jacques Marquette is the first European known to have explored the area, with other French-Canadian fur traders arriving in the late 17th century. The first permanent trading post was established by Jacques Vieau in 1795, while employed by the North West Company. Vieau built his cabin on top of a bluff overlooking the Menomonee Valley in what is now Mitchell Park. He was later joined by Solomon Juneau in 1818, who started one of three settlements that incorporated into the City of Milwaukee.

=== Development ===
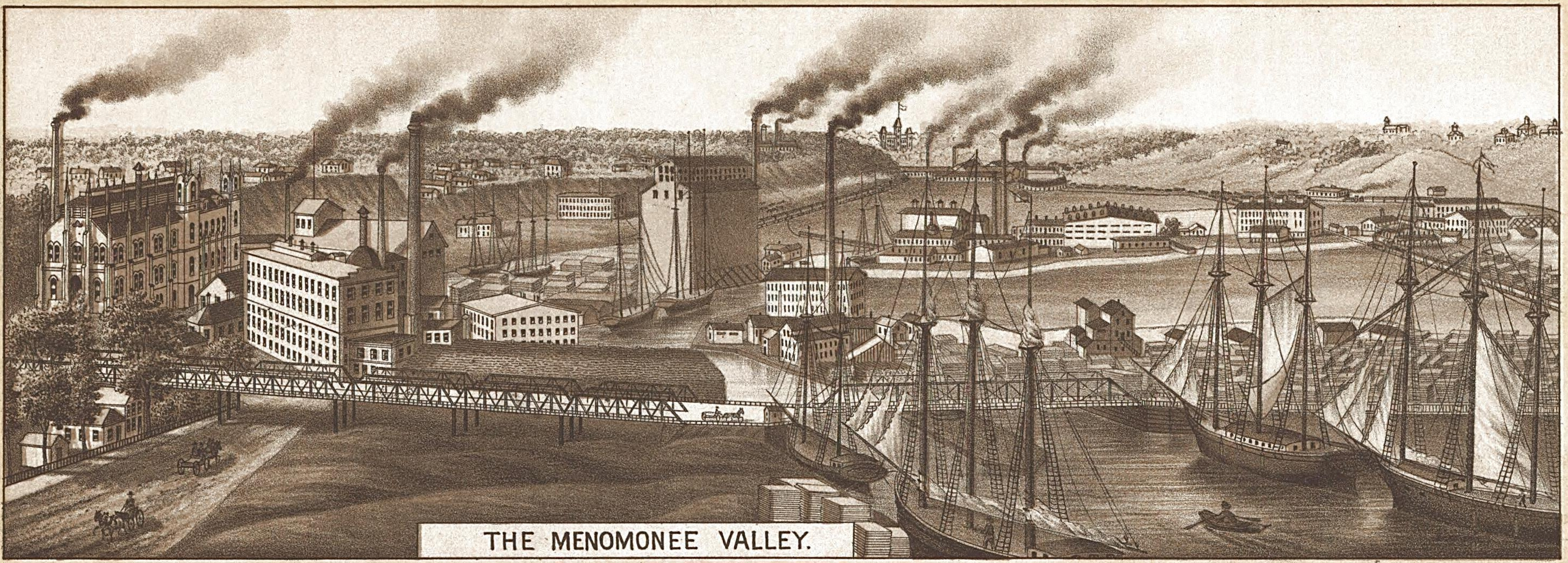
Menomonee Valley in 1882

Reshaping of the valley began with the railroads built by city co-founder Byron Kilbourn to bring product from Wisconsin's farm interior to the port. By 1862 Milwaukee was the largest shipper of wheat on the planet, and related industry developed. Grain elevators were built and, due to Milwaukee's dominant German immigrant population, breweries sprang up around the processing of barley and hops. A number of tanneries were constructed, of which the Pfister & Vogel tannery grew to become the largest in America.

In 1843 George Burnham and his brother Jonathan opened a brickyard near 16th Street. When a durable and distinct cream-colored brick came out of the clay beds, other brickyards sprang up to take advantage of this resource. Because many of the city's buildings were built using this material it earned the nickname "Cream City," and conversely the brick was called Cream City brick. By 1881 the Burnham brickyard, which employed 200 men and peaked at 15 million bricks a year, was the largest in the world.

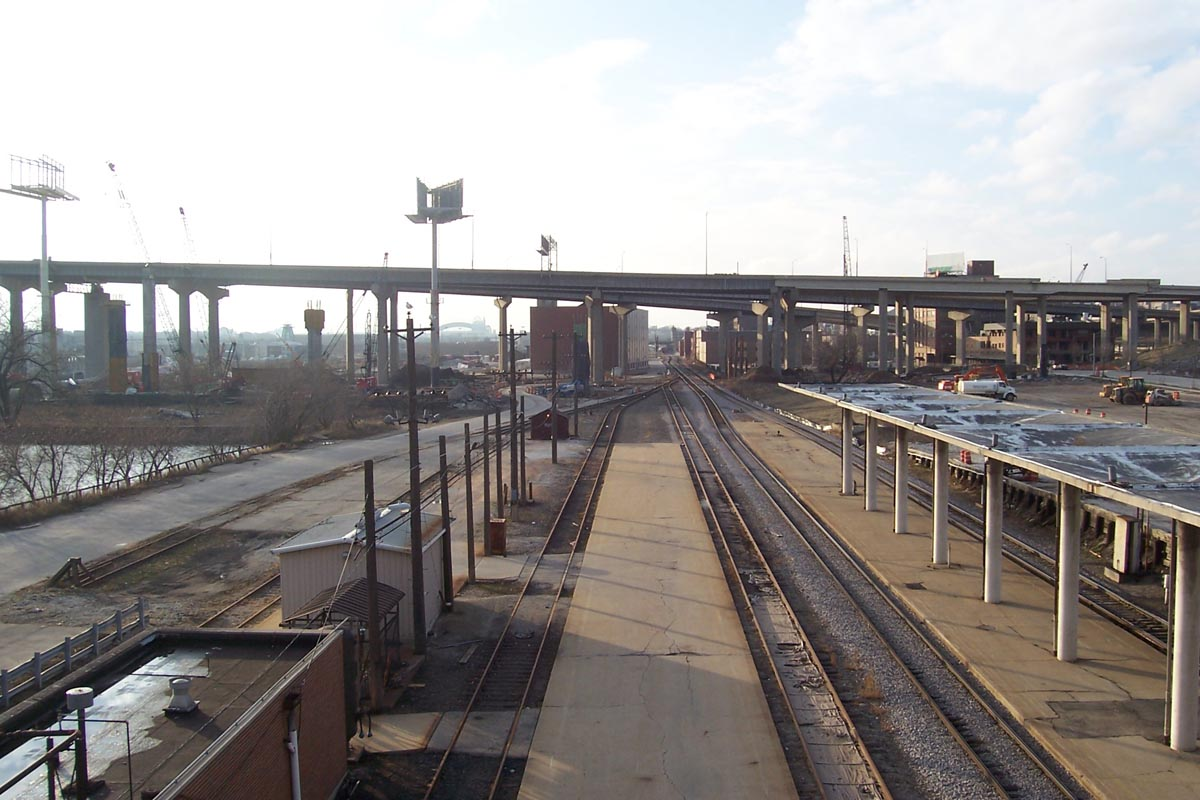
Menomonee Valley in 2006

=== Industrialization ===
Flour mills, packing plants, breweries, railways and tanneries further industrialized the valley. With the marshlands drained and the Kinnickinnic and Milwaukee Rivers dredged, attention turned to the valley. In 1869 an initiative was undertaken to channelize the Menomonee River and build a series of ship canals, which included Kneeland's Canal, Holton's Canal, Menomonee Canal, South Menomonee Canal and Burnham Canal. Part of South Menomonee Canal, Menomonee Canal, Kneeland's Canal and Holton's Canal have since been filled in, and Burhham canal is no longer navigable after extension of 11th St. with street level bridge in mid 1980s.

Unimaginable amounts of fill came down from the bluffs to raise the valley floor an average of 22 feet (6.7 m) and lower the north rim by as much as 60 feet (18 m). The steep inclines of the valley walls were softened, and more rail lines were put in. By the turn of the 20th century, the once natural marshlands teeming with wild rice, and water fowl was all but forgotten.

The first viaduct was completed in 1878 along 6th Street. It was later replaced in 1908 and again in 2002 with a photogenic design-build cable-stayed span touting dual bascule bridges. Other crossings followed with the 16th Street Viaduct in 1895 (replaced in 1929), the 27th Street Viaduct in 1910, and the 35th Street Viaduct in 1933.

By 1879 meat packing became the most important industry in the city, and the Menomonee Valley was a critical supply point for the likes of John Plankinton, Frederick Layton and Philip Armour. Packing houses populated the valley floor near the Milwaukee & St. Paul Railroad stockyard. A young Patrick Cudahy worked his way up through the ranks and went on to become owner of what is now Patrick Cudahy, Inc. Cudahy moved his operations to what later became the Milwaukee suburb of Cudahy, Wisconsin in 1892.

Along with the processing industries, bulk commodity storage and machining & manufacturing entered the scene. The valley was home to the Milwaukee Road, Falk Corporation, Cutler-Hammer, Harnischfeger Corporation, Chain Belt Company, Nordberg Manufacturing Company and other industry giants.

Heavy pollution and noxious odors became a problem as early as 1874 when a distillery was charged for producing "a nuisance simply stupendous in character." A Grand Jury was assembled in 1886 to tour the river and discover the origin of all the filth. One lecturer remarked that he "nearly stifled as the steamer came up the harbor this morning." The city also built an ill-conceived garbage crematory in 1890 that, along with the factories, locomotives and foundries, pumped clouds of acrid smoke which covered the valley in a thick layer of soot.

After World War II the economics of the valley declined because of a shift from rail and ship transportation to the interstate highways. Milwaukee also became part of the Rust Belt as recession set in, and the heavily industrialized Menomonee Valley was affected the most. By the late 1970s the Menomonee Valley was perceived by many to be an ugly blight in the heart of the city.

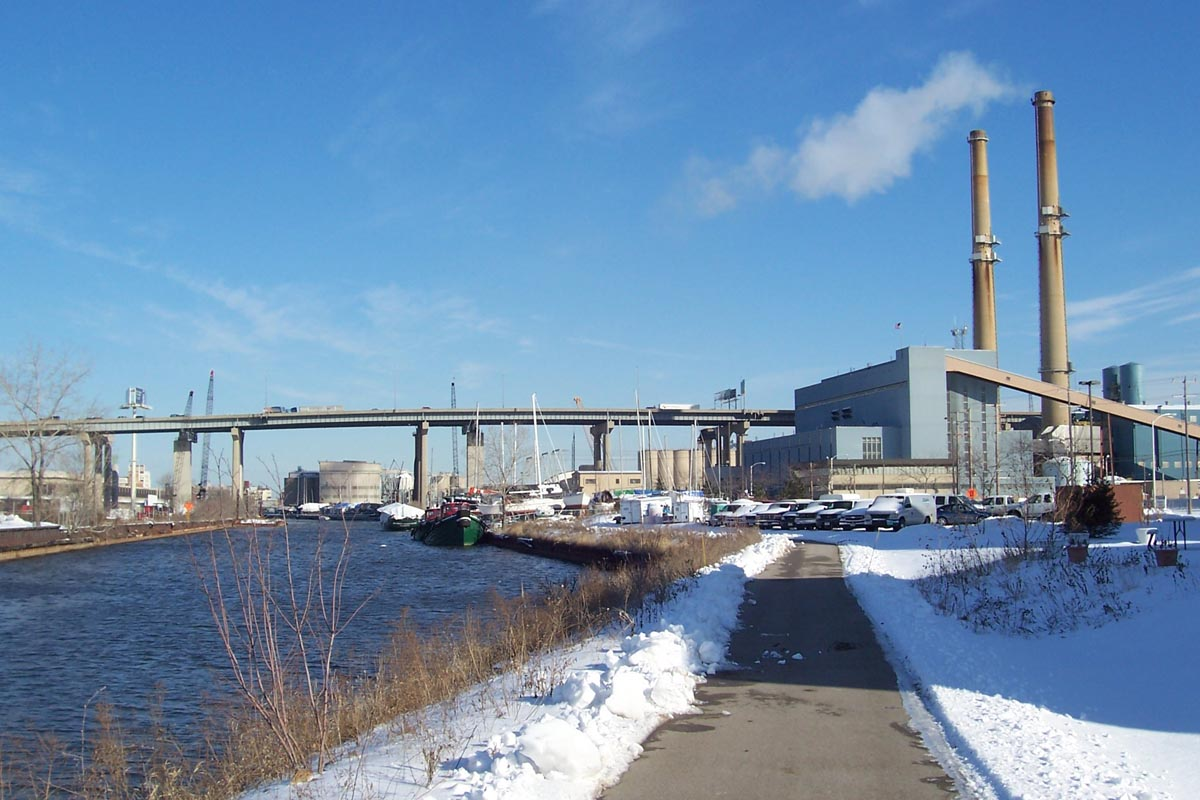
Hank Aaron State Trail

=== Rejuvenation ===
During the administration of Mayor Henry Maier the city purchased land for redevelopment. It paved roads to improve truck access and built a municipal garage along Canal Street, but these token gestures were not enough. It was not until a series of coordinated efforts started by Mayor John Norquist in 1988 that the valley began to see new growth. A "Renew the Valley" initiative was formed to revitalize the Menomonee Valley and increase available green space. Menomonee Valley Partners, Inc., a nonprofit organization, was formed in 1999 through a public-private partnership to oversee and coordinate efforts to revitalize the valley.

Anchors such as Potawatomi Hotel & Casino and a Milwaukee Metropolitan Sewerage District facility spurred development. Marquette University built an athletic field across the river just south of the main campus, and Emmpak Foods helped to beautify the area with a sculpture garden. A segment of the Hank Aaron State Trail was also paved along the Menomonee River to return public access to the waterway. In 2013, the 24-acre Three Bridges Park opened on a former rail yard site along the south bank of the Menomonee River between 27th and 35th streets, incorporating the improved trail as well as new bridge crossings and freshly planted native vegetation. Using leftover fill from the Marquette Interchange reconstruction project, the new park also includes landforms shaped to resemble typical glacial features from the area's geologic past, such as kames, drumlins, and eskers.

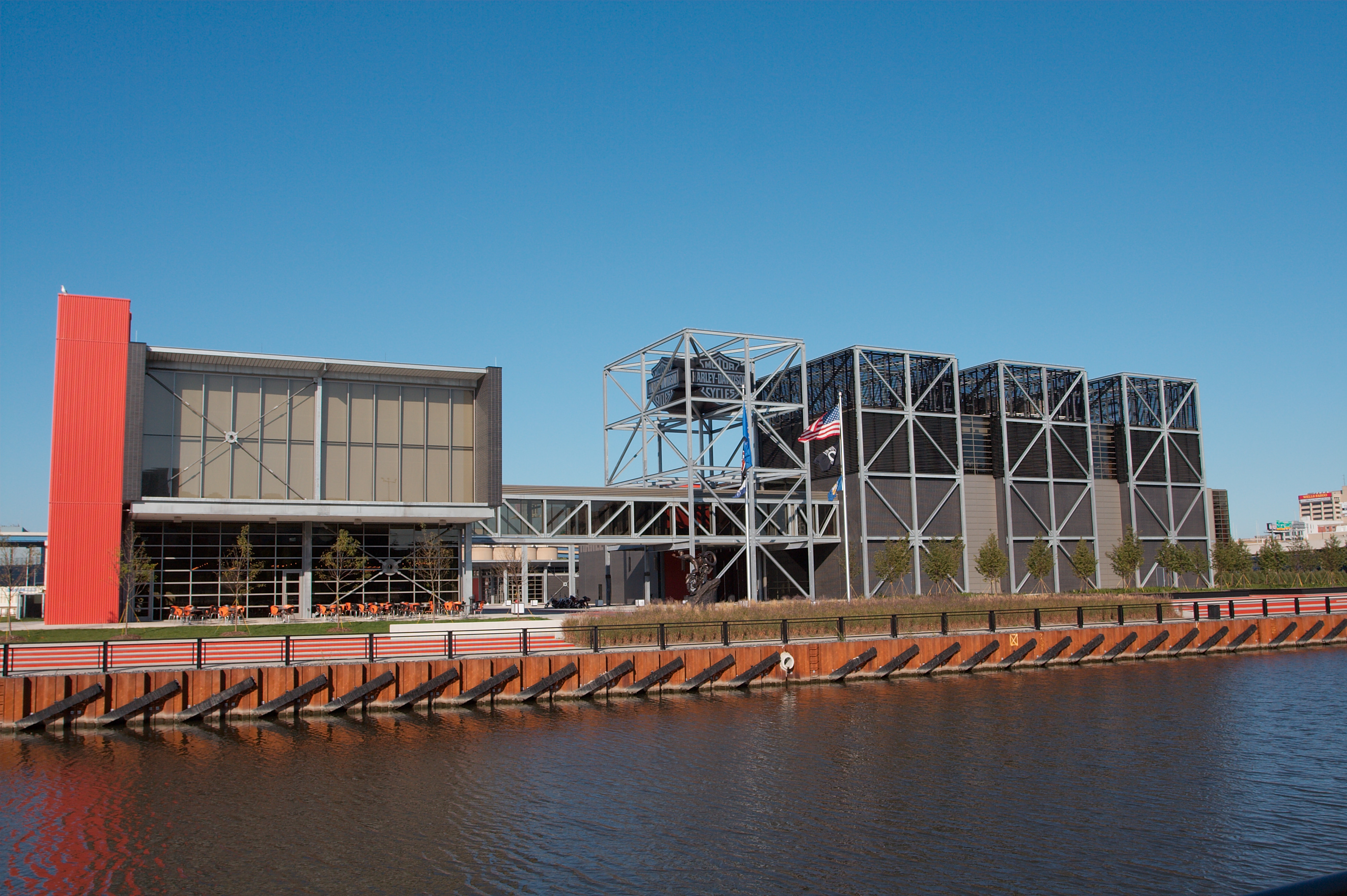
The Harley-Davidson Museum

The abandoned 140-acre (0.57 km^{2}) Milwaukee Road yards have been made into a business park with an innovative storm water runoff buffer using native plants. The $20 million brownfield project has been called the city's "largest environmental clean up in history." Two of the landmark smoke stacks standing in Chimney Park to memorialize what were once the largest rail yards in the nation have since been torn down because they were too unstable.

Harley-Davidson built a $75 million 130,000-square-foot (12,000 m^{2}) Harley-Davidson Museum at 6th & Canal Streets, which broke ground on June 1, 2006. It houses the company's vast collection of historic motorcycles and corporate archives, along with a restaurant, café and meeting space.

In 2015, the City of Milwaukee adopted the area plan Menomonee Valley 2.0 led by LA DALLMAN, the Wisconsin and Boston-based architecture practice of Grace La and James Dallman, in collaboration with numerous stakeholders and members of the community. This updated plan includes the newly created nonprofit Menomonee Valley Partners, along with replacing the 6th St viaduct with bridges that extend access into the valley, and redevelopment of the former Milwaukee Road Shops sites into the Menomonee Valley Industrial Center.

== See also ==
- Neighborhoods of Milwaukee
- 2006 Falk Corporation explosion

== Sources ==
- The Menomonee Valley: A Historical Overview by John Gurda
