= Armand J. Quick =

American chemist (1894–1978)

Armand James Quick (1894 – January 26, 1978) was an American haematologist and expert on blood clotting, having developed the original prothrombin time test.

== Early life and education ==
Quick was born in Theresa, Wisconsin in 1894, the son of a hardware merchant and housewife. At the age of five, Quick developed Pott disease: his father soon died of tuberculosis and his mother opened a dressmaking shop in the home while she taught her son.

Quick graduated from the University of Wisconsin in 1918, receiving a PhD from the University of Illinois in 1922 and an M.D. from Cornell University in 1928.

== Medical career ==
Quick began researching at Cornell and Fifth Avenue Hospital in New York City. While at the hospital, he developed the prothrombin time test (also known as the Quick test), which is used in the regulation of blood-thinning drugs. He also developed the prothrombin consumption time test, which became useful in diagnosing haemophilia.

He later moved to Milwaukee and joined the faculty of Marquette University (now the Medical College of Wisconsin), where he served as associate professor of pharmacology from 1935. He was chair of the Department of Biochemistry from 1944 until 1964.

In 1944, Quick received the American Medical Association's gold medal. In 1950, the Wisconsin State Medical Society awarded him the Council Award for his "attainments in the science and art of medicine and surgery". He received the Modern Medicine Award in 1954.

== Personal life ==
Quick was married to Margaret Koll, and they had a daughter named Edith. He died on January 26, 1978, at the age of 83.

== Legacy ==
The Medical College of Wisconsin named an award after Quick, which is "given to honor the senior students who, in the opinion of the faculty of the Department of Biochemistry, have demonstrated outstanding scholarship in Biochemistry and research with a dedication to future medical research".

Helen Payling Wright described Quick as "distinguished" in a review of his 1957 book Haemorrhagic Diseases. In a review of his 1970 book Bleeding Problems in Clinical Medicine, M. C. G. Israels wrote that "no one has done more to develop the scientific analysis of clinical problems involving excessive bleeding than Professor Quick".

== Selected works ==
=== Books ===
Title	Time of first publication	First edition publisher/publication	Unique identifier	Notes
Haemorrhagic Diseases	1957	Henry Kimpton	OCLC 767911732	
Bleeding Problems in Clinical Medicine	1970	Saunders	OCLC 910212405	
