= Robert B. Wentworth =

19th century American politician

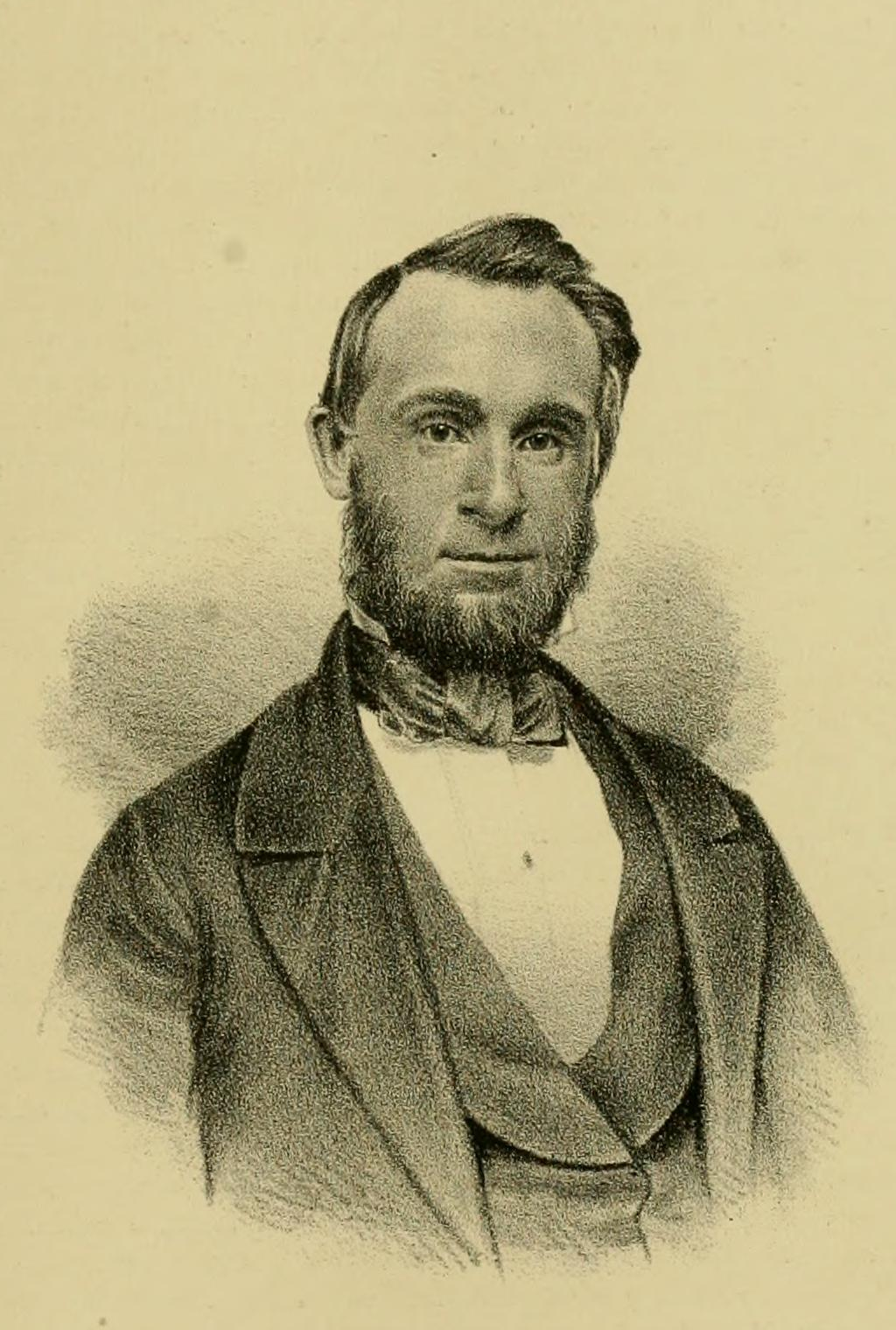
- Portrait from The History of Columbia County, Wisconsin (1880)

Member of the Wisconsin State Assembly from the Dodge 3rd district
- In office January 5, 1857 – January 4, 1858
- Preceded by: Lawrence Connor
- Succeeded by: Paul Juneau

Personal details
- Born: January 18, 1827 Buxton, Maine, U.S.
- Died: August 9, 1914 (aged 87) Portage, Wisconsin, U.S.
- Resting place: Silver Lake Cemetery, Portage, Wisconsin
- Party: Republican
- Spouses: Lydia H. Pike (m. 1850; died 1894); Emma C. Haight (m. 1898–1914)
- Children: Ella Augusta (Carr)^{(b. 1852; died 1923)}; Winfield Scott Wentworth^{(b. 1853; died 1907)}; Florence (Thomas)^{(b. 1855; died 1913)}; John Pike Wentworth^{(b. 1856; died 1859)}

Robert Boyd Wentworth (January 18, 1827 – August 9, 1914) was an American newspaper publisher and Republican politician. He published the first newspaper in Dodge County, Wisconsin—the Dodge County Gazette—and represented Dodge County in the Wisconsin State Assembly during the 1857 session.

== Biography ==
Robert Boyd Wentworth was born in Buxton, Maine, in January 1827. He was raised in that area and worked as a boy at Portland, Maine, learning the printing trade. He came to Wisconsin in 1848 and settled at Madison, Wisconsin, where he worked as a journeyman printer. Subsequently, he moved to Juneau, Wisconsin, where he published the Dodge County Gazette—the first paper in that county. He later renamed the paper the Burr Oak. In 1853, he was one of the 31 founders of the Wisconsin Press Association.

In 1856, he was elected to the Wisconsin State Assembly from Dodge County's 3rd Assembly district.

In 1857, he relocated to Portage, Wisconsin, in Columbia County, and purchased a paper called the Independent from Julius C. Chandler. He renamed it the Portage City Record and published for several years in partnership with Andrew Jackson Turner and Moses M. Davis. Turner later bought out the other two partners and merged the paper with the Wisconsin State Register.

After selling his stake in the Record, Wentworth pursued other business ventures, building a grain elevator on the bank of the ship canal between the Fox and Wisconsin rivers. He subsequently operated a successful grain trade for several years, and through that interest developed into shipping, creating the Portage and Green Bay Transportation Company. He then moved into banking and was one of the founders of the City Bank of Portage. In 1880, he was one of the founders of the Portage Hosiery Company, which became a significant employer in the city. Aside from his business ventures, Wentworth served several years on the Portage city council.

Wentworth died in August 1914 after a brief illness.

== Personal life and family ==
Robert Wentworth was the son of Robert Wentworth and his first wife, Sally (née Harding). The Wentworths were descended from Reginald Wentworth, who was lord of Wentworth in Yorkshire during the time of the Norman Conquest in 1066 AD. Robert B. Wentworth was a seventh generation American, being a direct descendant of William Wentworth, a Puritan elder who came to the Massachusetts Bay Colony in 1636.

Robert B. Wentworth married Lydia H. Pike of Fryeburg, Maine, on October 9, 1850. They had four children together, though their youngest son died in childhood. Lydia died in June 1894 after 44 years of marriage. Wentworth subsequently married Emma C. Haight of Milwaukee, a sister of Elmer E. Haight.

Wisconsin State Assembly
Preceded by Lawrence Connor	Member of the Wisconsin State Assembly from the Dodge 3rd district January 5, 1857 – January 4, 1858	Succeeded by Paul Juneau
