= Theresa, Wisconsin =

Village in Wisconsin, United States

- Village
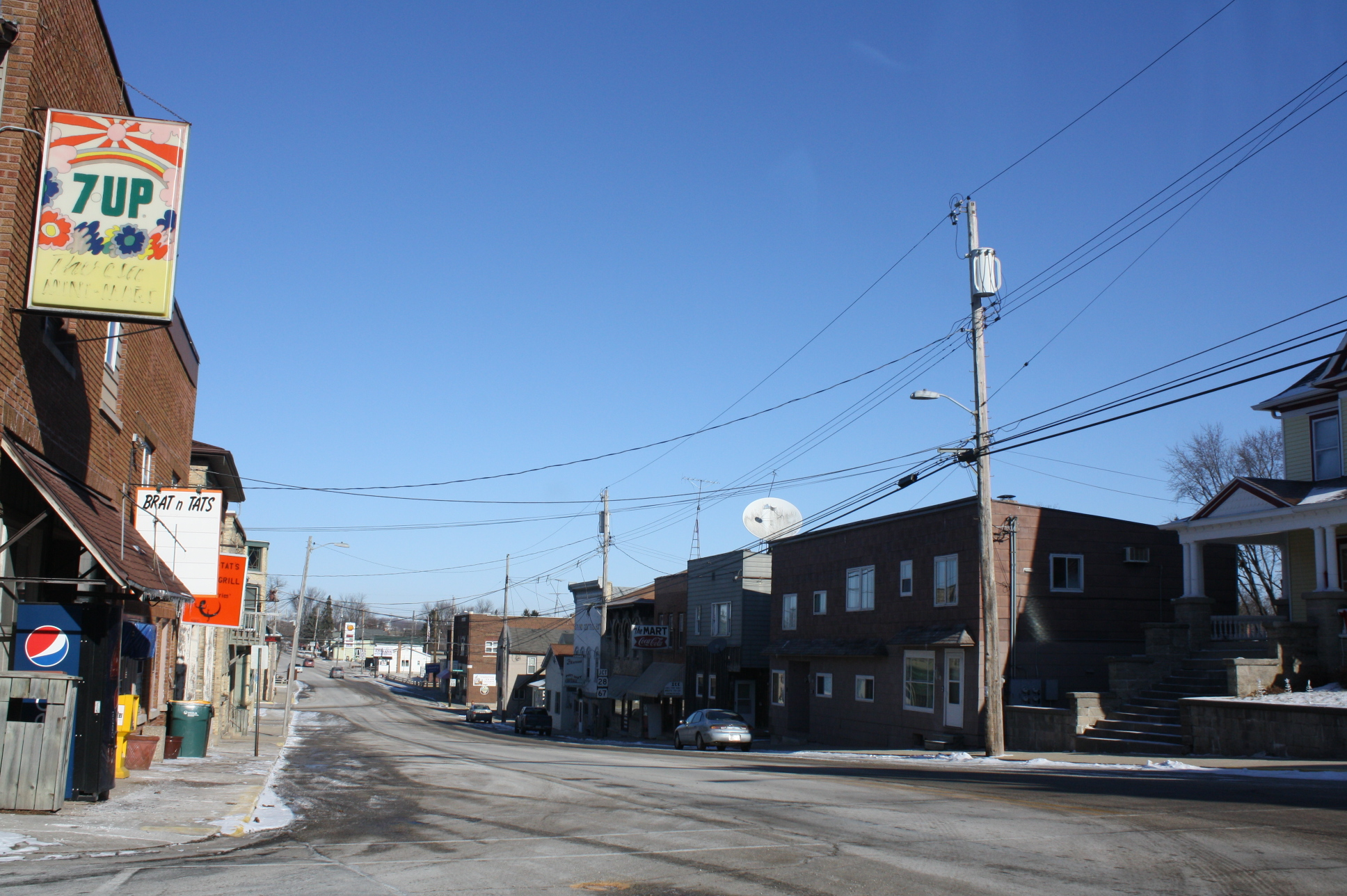
- Looking north in downtown Theresa

- Location of Theresa in Dodge County, Wisconsin.
- Coordinates: 43°30′21″N 88°27′33″W
- Country: United States
- State: Wisconsin
- County: Dodge

Area
  - Total: 0.82 sq mi (2.13 km^{2})
  - Land: 0.80 sq mi (2.08 km^{2})
  - Water: 0.015 sq mi (0.04 km^{2})
- Elevation: 965 ft (294 m)

Population (2020)
  - Total: 1,255
  - Density: 1,560/sq mi (603/km^{2})
- Time zone: UTC-6 (Central (CST))
  - Summer (DST): UTC-5 (CDT)
- Zip Code: 53091
- Area code: 920
- FIPS code: 55-79425
- GNIS feature ID: 1575345
- Website: villageoftheresa.com

Theresa is a village in Dodge County, Wisconsin, United States. The population was 1,255 at the 2020 census. The village is surrounded by the Town of Theresa.

== History ==
Theresa was founded by Solomon Juneau along with his Metis wife, Josette Vieau Juneau, and children in the 1850s. It was named for Solomon's mother, (Marie-)Thérèse Galarneau Juneau.

During World War I, more than 600 people from over a dozen surrounding communities prevented former mayor of Milwaukee and Socialist party member Emil Seidel from holding a "pro-German" meeting in Theresa.

== Geography ==
Theresa is located at 43°31′0″N 88°27′10″W (43.51667, -88.453001).

According to the United States Census Bureau, the village has a total area of 0.82 square miles (2.12 km^{2}), of which 0.80 square miles (2.07 km^{2}) is land and 0.02 square miles (0.05 km^{2}) is water.

== Demographics ==
Historical population
| Census | Pop. | Note | %± |
|---|---|---|---|
| 1880 | 277 | | — |
| 1900 | 355 | | — |
| 1910 | 345 | | −2.8% |
| 1920 | 381 | | 10.4% |
| 1930 | 427 | | 12.1% |
| 1940 | 418 | | −2.1% |
| 1950 | 461 | | 10.3% |
| 1960 | 576 | | 24.9% |
| 1970 | 611 | | 6.1% |
| 1980 | 766 | | 25.4% |
| 1990 | 771 | | 0.7% |
| 2000 | 1,252 | | 62.4% |
| 2010 | 1,262 | | 0.8% |
| 2020 | 1,255 | | −0.6% |
U.S. Decennial Census

=== 2010 census ===
As of the 2010 census, there were 1,262 people, 539 households, and 365 families living in the village. The population density was 1,577.5 inhabitants per square mile (609.1/km^{2}). There were 588 housing units at an average density of 735.0 per square mile (283.8/km^{2}). The racial makeup of the village was 97.5% White, 0.4% African American, 0.6% Native American, 0.2% Asian, 0.6% from other races, and 0.7% from two or more races. Hispanic or Latino of any race were 1.7% of the population.

There were 539 households, of which 26.9% had children under the age of 18 living with them, 54.5% were married couples living together, 7.6% had a female householder with no husband present, 5.6% had a male householder with no wife present, and 32.3% were non-families. 28.4% of all households were made up of individuals, and 11.2% had someone living alone who was 65 years of age or older. The average household size was 2.34 and the average family size was 2.85.

The median age in the village was 42 years. 21.1% of residents were under the age of 18; 6.6% were between the ages of 18 and 24; 27.3% were from 25 to 44; 28.7% were from 45 to 64; and 16.2% were 65 years of age or older. The gender makeup of the village was 51.1% male and 48.9% female.

=== 2000 census ===
As of the 2000 census, there were 1,252 people, 495 households, and 365 families living in the village. The population density was 1,672.8 people per square mile (644.5/km^{2}). There were 528 housing units at an average density of 705.5 per square mile (271.8/km^{2}). The racial makeup of the village was 97.92% White, 0.08% Black or African American, 0.32% Native American, 0.08% Asian, 0.88% from other races, and 0.72% from two or more races. 1.92% of the population were Hispanic or Latino of any race.

There were 495 households, out of which 34.1% had children under the age of 18 living with them, 60.6% were married couples living together, 9.3% had a female householder with no husband present, and 26.1% were non-families. 20.6% of all households were made up of individuals, and 8.5% had someone living alone who was 65 years of age or older. The average household size was 2.53 and the average family size was 2.94.

In the village, the population was spread out, with 26.0% under the age of 18, 6.6% from 18 to 24, 33.7% from 25 to 44, 19.3% from 45 to 64, and 14.4% who were 65 years of age or older. The median age was 36 years. For every 100 females, there were 99.4 males. For every 100 females age 18 and over, there were 98.5 males.

The median income for a household in the village was $44,200, and the median income for a family was $50,795. Males had a median income of $37,216 versus $26,023 for females. The per capita income for the village was $17,906. About 1.7% of families and 3.6% of the population were below the poverty line, including 2.2% of those under age 18 and 9.0% of those age 65 or over.

== Images ==
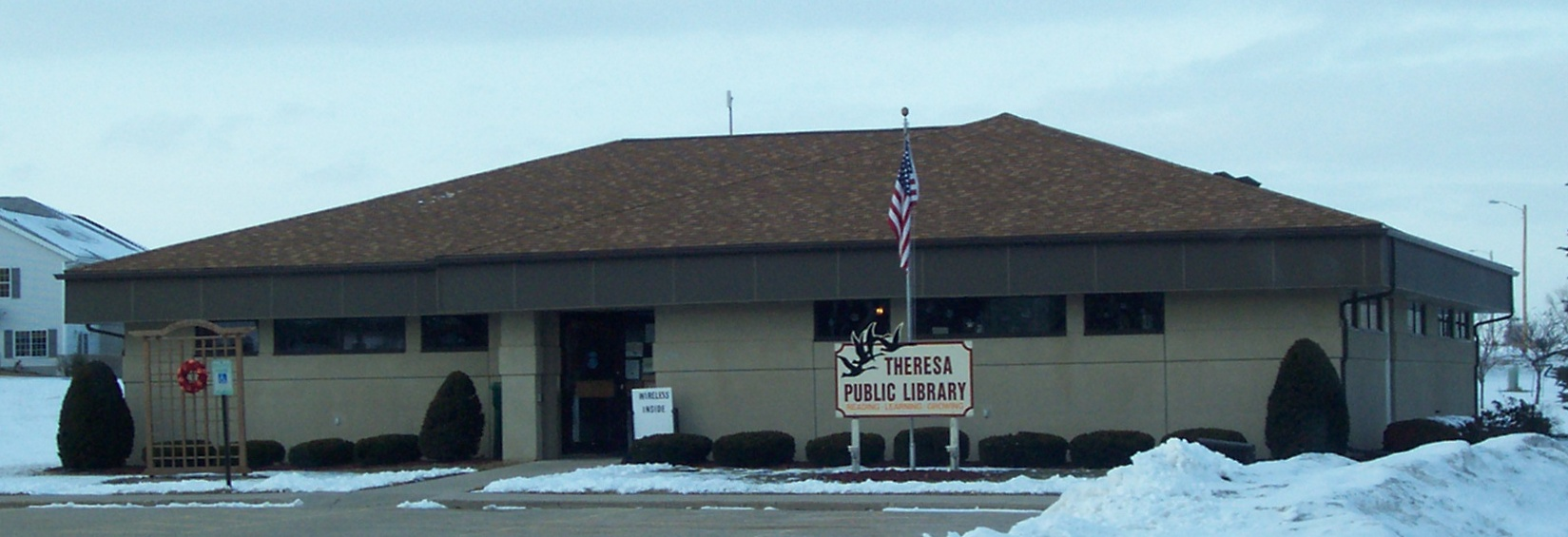
Theresa Public Library

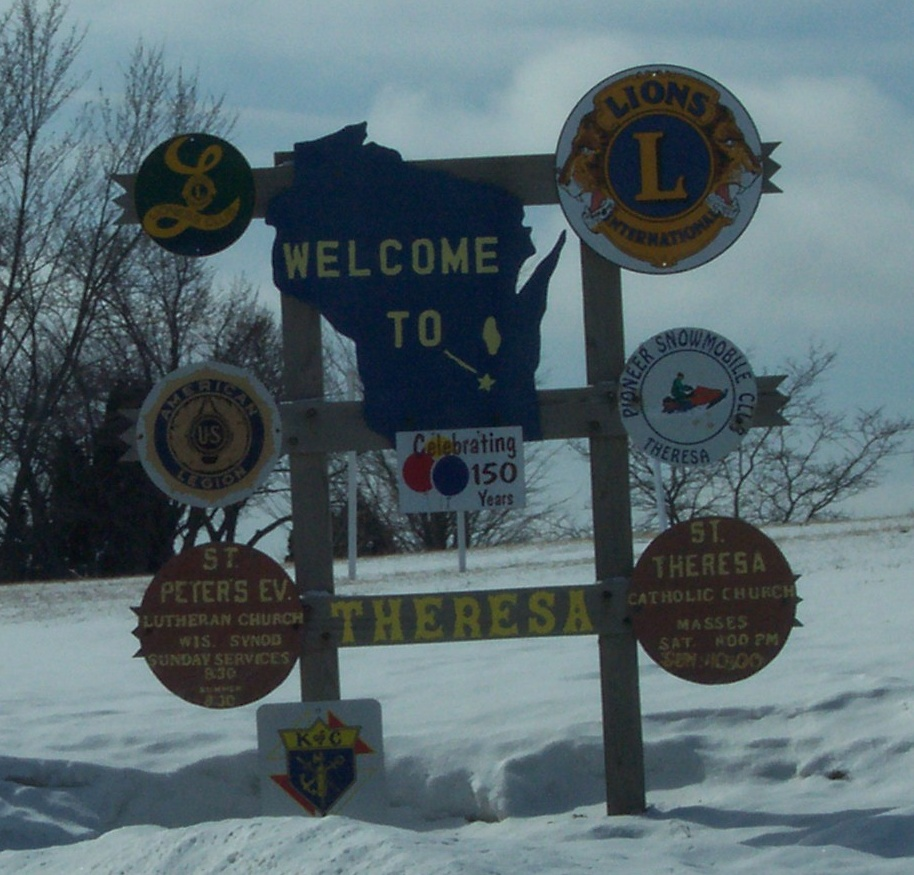
Northern welcome sign

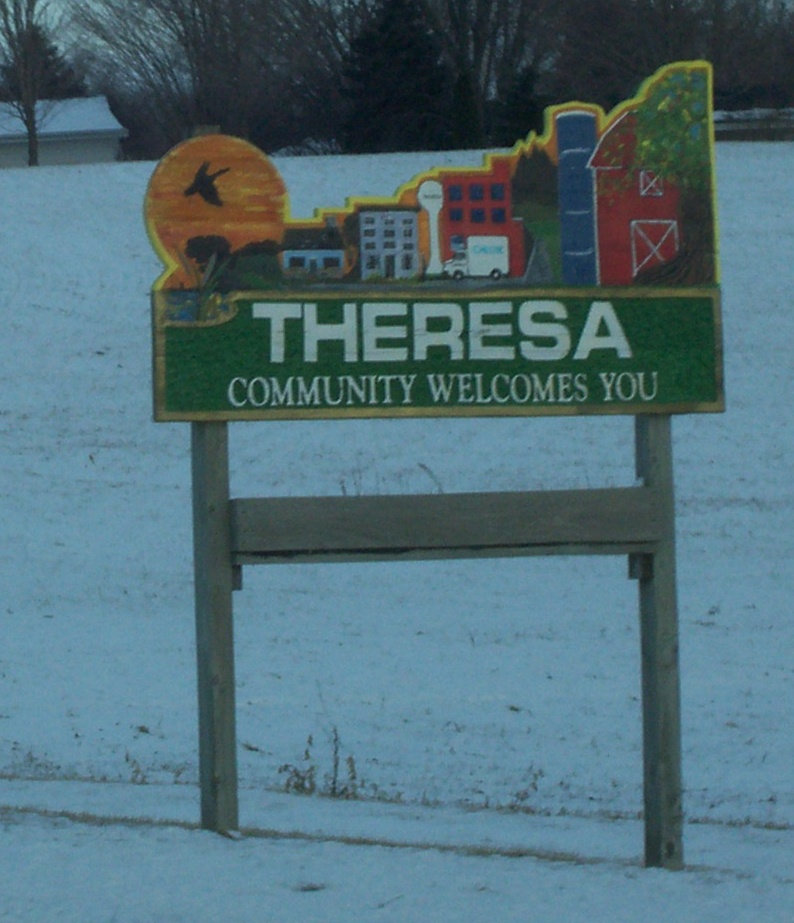
Western welcome sign

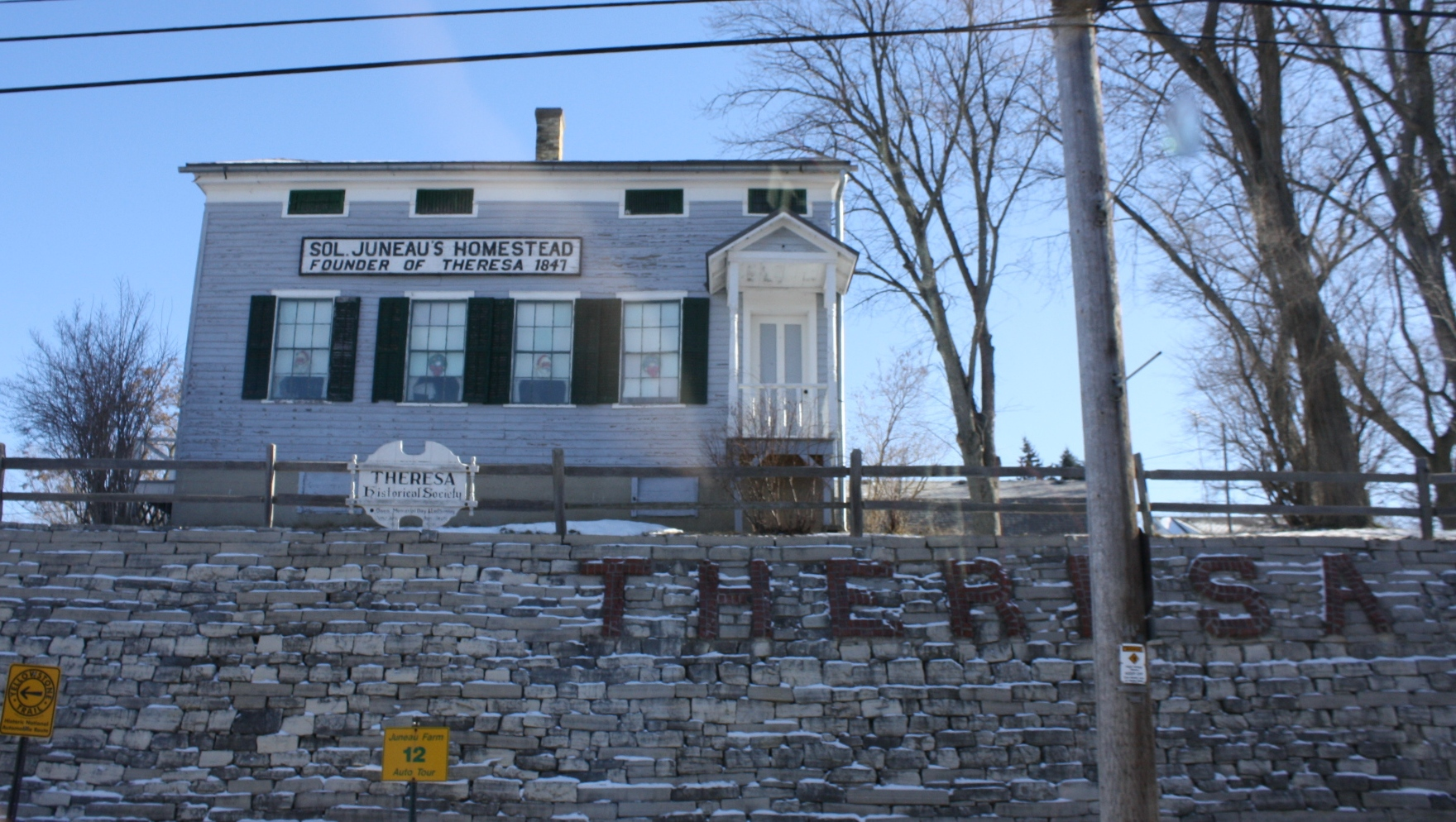
Solomon Juneau house, Theresa founder. Now houses Theresa Historical Society

== Notable people ==
- Jacob Bodden, Wisconsin State Representative, lived in Theresa.
- Peter Langenfeld, Wisconsin State Representative, lived in Theresa.
- George H. Walther, Wisconsin State Assembly, lived in Theresa.
- Ty Bodden, Wisconsin State Representative, previously lived in Theresa.
- Armand J. Quick, Doctor and haematologist
