= Theresa Station, Wisconsin =

- Unincorporated community
- Location within Wisconsin Location within the United States
- Coordinates: 43°31′36″N 88°25′40″W
- Country: United States
- State: Wisconsin
- County: Dodge
- Town: Theresa
- Elevation: 942 ft (287 m)
- Time zone: UTC-6 (Central (CST))
  - Summer (DST): UTC-5 (CDT)
- Area code: 920
- GNIS feature ID: 1575347

Theresa Station is an unincorporated community located in the town of Theresa, Dodge County, Wisconsin, United States. The area was located at a railroad depot for the Minneapolis, St. Paul and Sault Ste. Marie Railroad, commonly known as the Soo Line. The area once featured "two feed mills and a lumberyard." The depot has since been torn down.

Preceding station	Soo Line	Following station
Lomira toward Portal	Main Line	Allenton toward Chicago
