= Solomon Juneau =

American mayor (1793–1856)

Solomon Laurent Juneau
- Laurent-Salomon Juneau
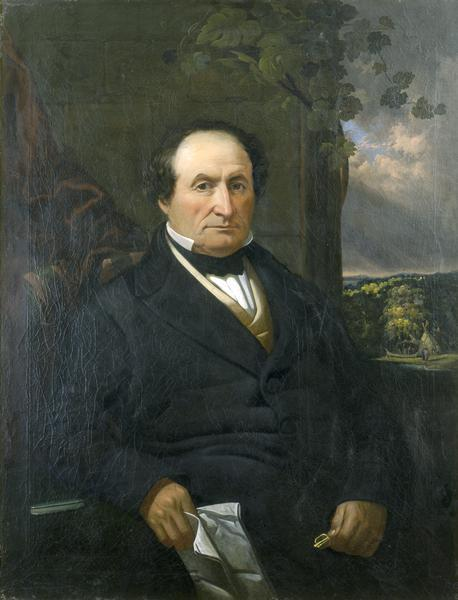
- Juneau in 1856

1st Mayor of Milwaukee
- In office January 31, 1846 – April 1847
- Preceded by: Position established
- Succeeded by: Horatio N. Wells

Personal details
- Born: August 9, 1793 Repentigny, Lower Canada, UK
- Died: November 14, 1856 (aged 63) Keshena, Wisconsin, U.S.
- Resting place: Calvary Cemetery, Milwaukee
- Party: Democratic
- Spouse: Josette Vieau Juneau (m. 1820; died 1855)
- Children: 17, including Narcisse Juneau and Paul Juneau
- Relatives: Paul O. Husting (grandson); Bert Husting (grandson); Joseph Juneau (cousin)
- Occupation: Politician, fur trader, land agent
- Known for: Helped found the city of Milwaukee, Wisconsin

Solomon Laurent Juneau or Laurent-Salomon Juneau (August 9, 1793 – November 14, 1856) was a French Canadian fur trader, land speculator, politician, and pioneer. He was one of the founders of the city of Milwaukee, Wisconsin, and served as the first mayor of Milwaukee in 1846. Juneau's settlement was the earliest of the three villages that later combined into the city of Milwaukee, his Juneautown grew up around a trading post he established in 1818, on the peninsula between Lake Michigan and the Milwaukee River. Juneau was also the founder of the Milwaukee Sentinel newspaper in 1837, which has endured as Milwaukee's paper of record up to the present day as the Milwaukee Journal Sentinel.

Later, Juneau and his sons, Narcisse Juneau and Paul Juneau, would move inland and found settlements in Dodge County, Wisconsin, including Theresa, Wisconsin—named for Solomon's mother. Juneau, Wisconsin, was named for Paul after his accidental death in that village.

Juneau's grandson Paul O. Husting would become a United States senator. Another grandson, Bert Husting, was an early professional baseball player and later a U.S. attorney. Joseph Juneau, the founder of the city of Juneau, Alaska, was a cousin of Solomon Juneau.

== Biography ==
Solomon Juneau was born in Repentigny, Quebec, to François and (Marie-)Thérèse Galarneau Juneau.

After landing at Fort Michilimackinac in 1816, Juneau worked as a clerk in the fur trade before becoming an agent for the American Fur Company in Milwaukee. He had been summoned to the Milwaukee area by Jacques Vieau, a French-Canadian fur trader and the first permanent white settler in Milwaukee, Wisconsin. In 1818 Jacques Vieau hired Juneau, based on the accounting prowess Juneau had become known for, and his reputation for being able to deal well with the local native Americans. Juneau later married one of Vieau's daughters, Josette, and went on to found what was to become the City of Milwaukee.

Juneau settled an area east of the Milwaukee River called Juneautown (present-day East Town) in 1818, which later joined with George H. Walker's Walker's Point and Byron Kilbourn's Kilbourntown (present-day Westown) to incorporate the City of Milwaukee. With Juneau came his personal cook, Joe Oliver, a Black Catholic believed to have been the first African American in Milwaukee history.

In 1831, Juneau began learning English and set in motion the naturalization and citizenship process. By 1835, he was selling plots of land in Juneautown. He built Milwaukee's first store and first inn, and was recognized for his leadership among newcomers to Milwaukee. In 1837 he started the Milwaukee Sentinel, which would become the oldest continuously operating business in Wisconsin. He was the first mayor of Milwaukee from 1846 until 1847, and was appointed its first postmaster. Solomon Juneau High School, built in 1932, is named after him. The school is located at 6415 West Mount Vernon Avenue in Milwaukee. The hour bell in the clock tower of the Milwaukee City Hall, installed in 1896, is also named after him.

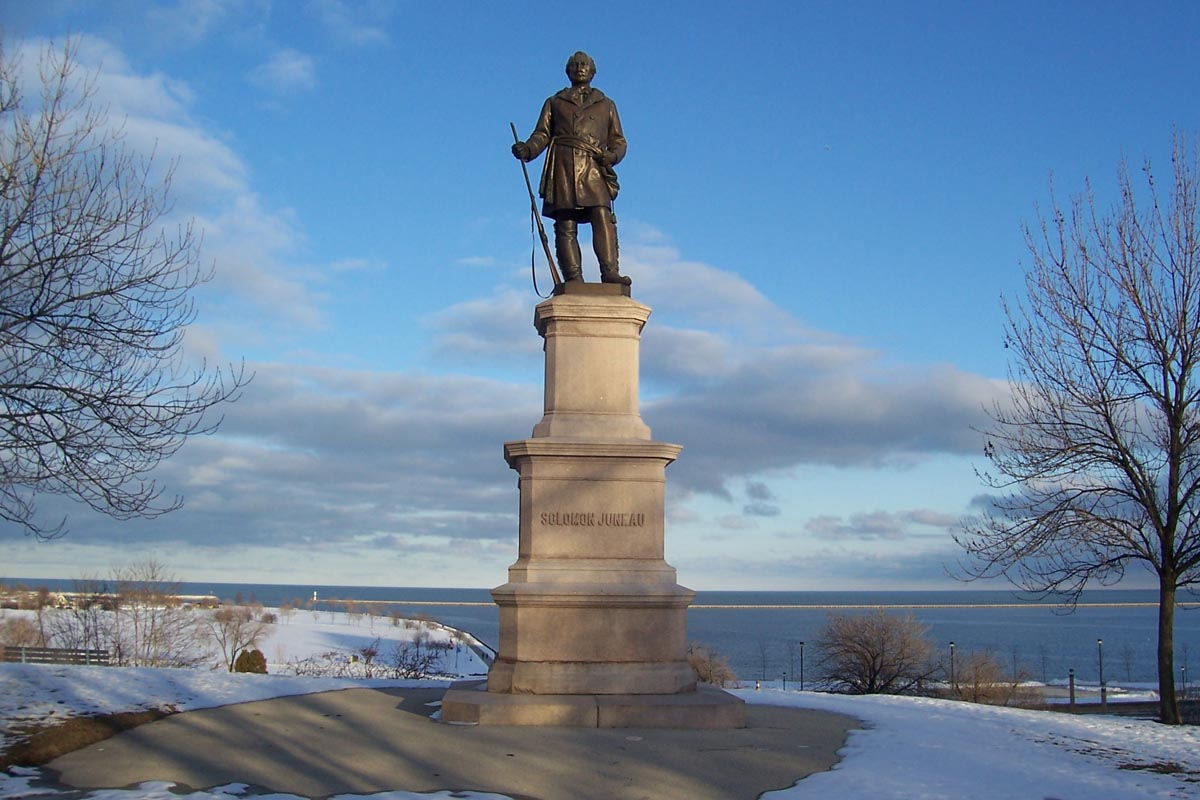
Statue of Juneau in Juneau Park, Milwaukee

=== Personal life ===
In 1820, Juneau married Josette Le-Vieux, the daughter of Jacques Vieau, a fur trader for the North West Company who had built a trading post overlooking the Menomonee Valley years before, and his Menominee wife. Josette was the oldest of 12 children, and was Menominee and French by ancestry. Through her alliances to the tribe, and the relationships fostered through Juneau's business in fur trading, it is reported that Juneau was popular with the Menominee. After the treaty of 1848 between the United States and the Menominee, he registered his wife and children as half-breeds of the Menominee Nation.

Juneau's grave at Calvary Cemetery

In 1854, Juneau and family relocated to Dodge County, Wisconsin, where they founded the village of Theresa, named after Juneau's French-Canadian mother. Josette died there in 1855; Solomon died one year later in Keshena, Wisconsin, on a visit to the Menominee tribe. He died in the arms of Benjamin Hunkins, his "faithful friend and constant nurse." Six Menominee chiefs served as pallbearers at his funeral. He is buried at Calvary Cemetery, Milwaukee, Wisconsin.

Short video of Juneau Monument in Milwaukee

Juneau's grandson Paul O. Husting would be elected as a member of the United States Senate. The property that is believed to have once been the site of Juneau's residence is now the site of the Mitchell Building, listed on the National Register of Historic Places.

== See also ==
- SS Solomon Juneau
- Juneau Monument
- Solomon Juneau Business High School

Political offices
City incorporated	Mayor of Milwaukee; January 31, 1846 – April 1847	Succeeded by Horatio N. Wells
