= Peter Langenfeld =

American politician

Peter Langenfeld (December 8, 1837 – ?) was an American politician, teacher, and businessman.

Born in Prussia, Langenfeld emigrated to the United States settling first in Menasha, Wisconsin, then Iron Ridge, Wisconsin, and finally in Theresa, Wisconsin. He was a teacher and secretary of the town insurance company. Langenfeld served as town clerk and justice of the peace. In 1878, Langenfeld served in the Wisconsin State Assembly and was a Democrat.
