= Theresa (town), Wisconsin =

Theresa
- Town
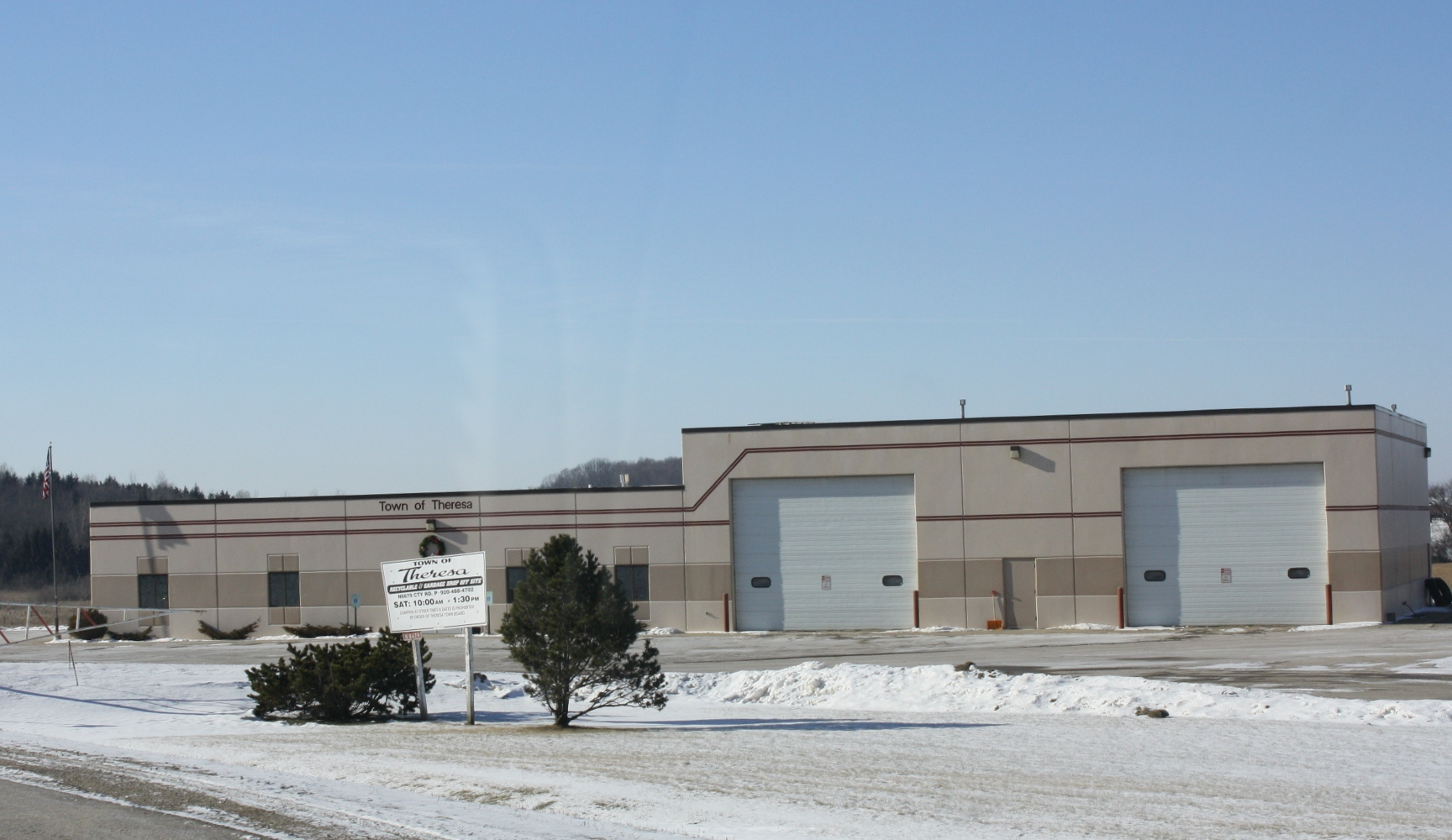
- Town hall

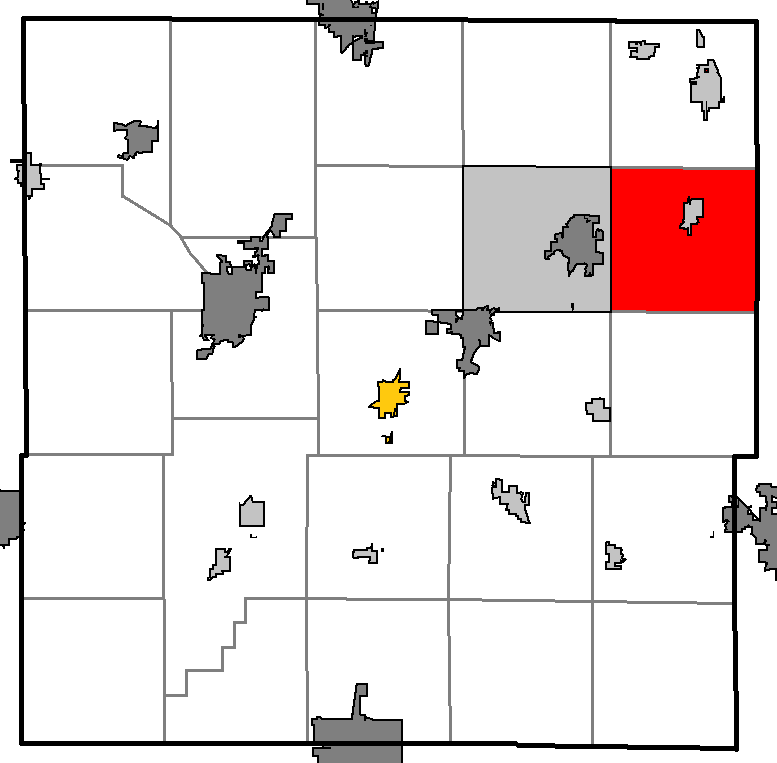
- Location of Theresa, within Dodge County

- Location within the state of Wisconsin
- Coordinates: 43°31′2″N 88°27′12″W
- Country: United States
- State: Wisconsin
- County: Dodge

Area
  - Total: 35.6 sq mi (92.3 km^{2})
  - Land: 35.2 sq mi (91.1 km^{2})
  - Water: 0.46 sq mi (1.2 km^{2})

Population (2020)
  - Total: 1,089
  - Density: 31.0/sq mi (12.0/km^{2})
- Time zone: UTC-6 (Central (CST))
  - Summer (DST): UTC-5 (CDT)
- Area code: 920
- Website: https://townoftheresawi.gov/

Theresa is a town in Dodge County, Wisconsin, United States. As of the census in 2020, the town population was 1,089. The Village of Theresa is located within the town. The unincorporated community of Theresa Station is located in the town. The unincorporated community of Hochheim is also located partially in the town.

== Geography ==
According to the United States Census Bureau, the town has a total area of 35.6 square miles (92.3 km^{2}), of which 35.2 square miles (91.1 km^{2}) is land and 0.5 square mile (1.2 km^{2}) (1.35%) is water.

== Demographics ==
As of the census of 2000, there were 1,080 people, 364 households, and 299 families residing in the town. The population density was 30.7 people per square mile (11.9/km^{2}). There were 374 housing units at an average density of 10.6 per square mile (4.1/km^{2}). The racial makeup of the town was 97.78% White, 1.57% Asian, 0.09% from other races, and 0.56% from two or more races. 0.19% of the population were Hispanic or Latino of any race.

There were 364 households, out of which 39.6% had children under the age of 18 living with them, 76.6% were married couples living together, 1.6% had a female householder with no husband present, and 17.6% were non-families. 14.0% of all households were made up of individuals, and 6.0% had someone living alone who was 65 years of age or older. The average household size was 2.97 and the average family size was 3.30.

In the town, the population was spread out, with 27.7% under the age of 18, 8.3% from 18 to 24, 29.2% from 25 to 44, 26.1% from 45 to 64, and 8.7% who were 65 years of age or older. The median age was 37 years. For every 100 females, there were 105.3 males. For every 100 females age 18 and over, there were 107.7 males.

The median income for a household in the town was $55,417, and the median income for a family was $56,927. Males had a median income of $36,434 versus $25,625 for females. The per capita income for the town was $20,451. About 1.3% of families and 2.2% of the population were below the poverty line, including none of those under age 18 and 6.1% of those age 65 or over.

== Notable people ==
- John M. Dihring, farmer and Wisconsin State Representative, was born in the town
