= Josette Vieau Juneau =

Menominee humanitarian

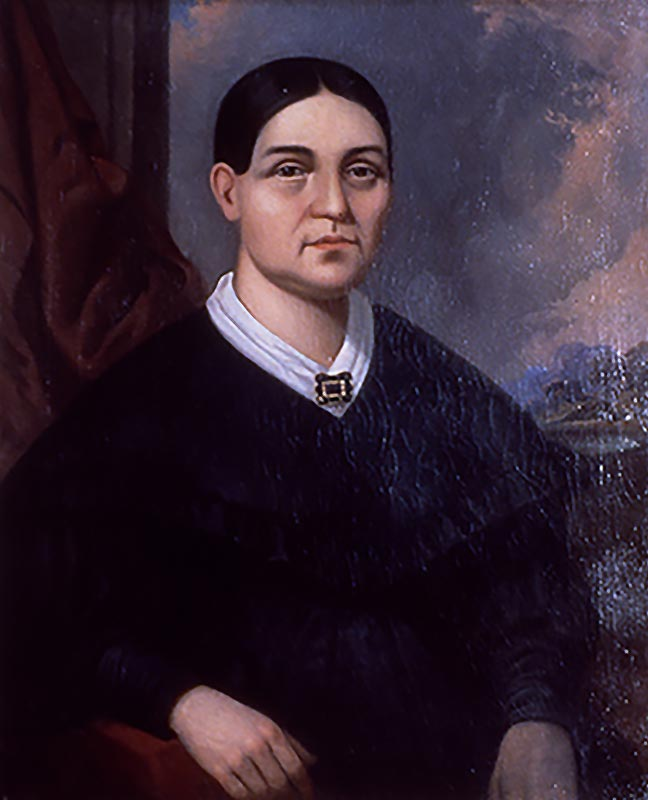
- Born: Josette Vieau; April 16, 1803; Fort Howard (Wisconsin)
- Died: November 19, 1855 (aged 52); Milwaukee
- Spouse: Solomon Juneau (1820–1855)
- Children: 17, including Narcisse Juneau
- Father: Jacques Vieau

Josette Juneau (née Josette Roy Le Vieux dit Vieau; April 16, 1803 – November 19, 1855) was a mixed Indigenous and Settler "founding mother" of Milwaukee, known for her charitable work.

== Early life ==
Josette Viaux was born on April 16, 1803, in Fort Howard to Jacques Vieau, a French Canadian fur trader for the North West Company, and Angelique Roy, a Menominee woman and relative of Potawatomi Indian leaders Ahkanepoway (her maternal grandfather) and Anaugesa. She was the eldest daughter of twelve children. Vieau spent much of her childhood at her father's fur-trading post in Milwaukee. A Catholic, she served at the St. Francis Xavier Mission near Green Bay, Wisconsin. She was multilingual, fluent and literate in French, and fluent in Menominee, Chippewa, Potawatomi, and Winnebago.

== Marriage and life in Milwaukee ==
In 1820, Vieau married one of her father's employees, Solomon Juneau. She worked at the fur post due to the many languages she spoke, and managed it in her husband's frequent absence. The Juneaus had seventeen children, fourteen of whom survived into adulthood. Juneau was active in their education.

Accounts report that Juneau prevented a Potwaomi revenge attack on a settlement on Potawatomi lands by keeping an all-night vigil. Another version of the story claims she spent the night speaking with the Potwaomi, holding off the attack.

Juneau was known for her work in the community and mission work. She hosted many ministers who passed through the area, provided nursing care to locals, and taught domestics and Christian doctrine to young women to help them find work. Juneau hosted Milwaukee's first ever mass in her home. Pope Leo XII sent her a reproduction of the Veil of Veronica commemorating her Catholic missionary work.

Although Solomon Juneau was prominent in the region and the first Milwaukee mayor, Josette Juneau rarely spoke English and rarely interacted with the incoming Americans. The Juneaus built a summer home in Theresa, Wisconsin, to be nearer to the Menominee community, where they retired in 1852.

In 1855, Juneau died at her daughter's house in Milwaukee.

Today, residents of Theresa, a village Solomon Juneau had founded and where the couple had lived, celebrate her and her husband's accomplishments on the local holiday of Founder's Day.
