= Jacques Vieau =

Monument in Mitchell Park

Jacques Vieau (or Vieaux or Vieux), born (Montreal QC, May 5, 1757 – July 1, 1852, Howard, Wisconsin) was a French-Canadian fur trader and the first permanent white settler in Milwaukee, Wisconsin. Also known as 'Jeambeau", Jacques Vieux was a descendant of a colonial French family that originally settled in Quebec City. Vieux was employed by the North West Company, developing trade roads from Quebec City to the Algonquines and Petawatomi Nations to what is today Kansas. He died in Howard, Wisconsin.

== Biography ==
In 1786 (240 years ago), Vieau came to Green Bay, where he married Angelique Roy that same year. She was the granddaughter of Potawatomi Indian chief Anaugesa. They had at least twelve children together.

In 1795, Vieau settled at Jambo Creek in Manitowoc County. While employed by the North West Company, Vieau established a fur trading post in the area that would become employed by the North West Company in 1795, along with outposts at Kewaunee, Manitowoc, and Sheboygan. His Milwaukee cabin was built on top of a bluff overlooking the Menomonee Valley and became his winter residence away from Green Bay. A historical monument marks this location in Mitchell Park as the first house in Milwaukee.

In 1818, Vieau hired another French-Canadian named Solomon Juneau, who later married his daughter Josette and went on to found what was to become the City of Milwaukee.

In 2016, a tombstone for his grave was placed.

== Family ==
Jacques Vieux, also known as "Jeambeau", married Angelique Roy, a woman with relatives in both the Menominee People and the Potawatomi Nation, they settled in Menomonee Valley area, they had several children, the elders were:

- Louis Vieux, prominent headman and appointed member of the first Potawatomi business committee to represent the Mission Band in Kansas. He was the founder of the Vieux Crossing to the Oregon Trail Road, near Louisville in Kansas.
- Josette Vieux, wife of Solomon Juneau, settled in the City of Milwaukee.

== Legacy ==
Vieau is the eponym of Vieau Elementary School and also a street found in Milwaukee, Wisconsin.

The living descendants of Vieau are centered on Green Bay.
