= Wisconsin's Dodge County 6th Assembly district =

Former American legislative district

Wisconsin's Dodge County 6th State Assembly district
- Obsolete
- Notes: 1852–1862

Wisconsin's Dodge County 6th Assembly district was a district in the Wisconsin State Assembly for several years in the early history of the state of Wisconsin, prior to the legislative redistricting reforms of 1972 which created the current numbered districts. Located in central Wisconsin, the district comprised parts of northern Dodge County, Wisconsin.

The district was in use for elections between 1852 and 1861.

== List of representatives ==
List of representatives from the Dodge County 6th district
Member	Party	Residence	Term start	Term end	Leg.
Dodge County was previously divided into the Dodge 1st, Dodge 2nd, Dodge 3rd, Dodge 4th and Dodge 5th Assembly districts
District created by 1852 Wisconsin Act 499
Edwin Hillyer	Dem.	Waupun	January 3, 1853	January 2, 1854	6th
Allen Hiram Atwater	Whig	Oak Grove	January 2, 1854	January 1, 1855	7th
John M. Sherman	Rep.	Burnett	January 1, 1855	January 7, 1856	8th
Henry Butterfield	Rep.	Waupun	January 7, 1856	January 5, 1857	9th
John J. Williams	Rep.	Springfield	January 5, 1857	January 4, 1858	10th
Edward J. Williams	Rep.	Elba	January 4, 1858	January 3, 1859	11th
John Lowth	Dem.	Lowell	January 3, 1859	January 2, 1860	12th
Harvey C. Griffin	Dem.	Oak Grove	January 2, 1860	January 7, 1861	13th
John J. Williams	Rep.	Lowell	January 7, 1861	January 6, 1862	14th
District abolished by 1861 Wisconsin Act 216; Dodge County was re-consolidated into the Dodge 1st, Dodge 2nd, Dodge 3rd, Dodge 4th and Dodge 5th Assembly districts
