= Wisconsin's Dodge County 3rd Assembly district =

Former American legislative district

Wisconsin's Dodge County 3rd State Assembly district
- Obsolete
- Notes: 1848–1896

Wisconsin's Dodge County 3rd Assembly district was a district in the Wisconsin State Assembly for much of the early history of the state of Wisconsin, prior to the legislative redistricting reforms of 1972 which created the current numbered districts. Located in central Wisconsin, the district was one of the 66 original Assembly districts defined in Article XIV of the Constitution of Wisconsin. The Constitution originally allocated five districts for Dodge County, Wisconsin; this district originally comprised part of the southeast corner of Dodge County.

The district was in use for the first 48 years of Wisconsin's history, from 1848 to 1896.

== List of representatives ==
List of representatives from the Dodge County 3rd district
Member	Party	Residence	Term start	Term end	Leg.
District created
Benjamin Randall	Dem.	Lebanon	June 5, 1848	January 1, 1849	1st
George G. King	Dem.	Shields	January 1, 1849	January 7, 1850	2nd
William T. Ward	Dem.	Hustisford	January 7, 1850	January 6, 1851	3rd
Charles B. Whitton	Dem.	Ashippun	January 6, 1851	January 5, 1852	4th
Maximilian Averbeck	Dem.	Emmet	January 5, 1852	January 3, 1853	5th
William M. Dennis	Dem.	Watertown	January 3, 1853	January 2, 1854	6th
Francis McCormick	Dem.	Ashippun	January 2, 1854	January 1, 1855	7th
Fred Schwefel	Ind.	Lebanon	January 1, 1855	January 7, 1856	8th
Lawrence Connor	Dem.	Emmet	January 7, 1856	January 5, 1857	9th
Robert B. Wentworth	Rep.	Juneau	January 5, 1857	January 4, 1858	10th
Paul Juneau	Dem.	Juneau	January 4, 1858	January 3, 1859	11th
Waldo Lyon	Rep.	Hustisford	January 3, 1859	January 2, 1860	12th
Jonathan W. Nash	Rep.	Oak Grove	January 2, 1860	January 7, 1861	13th
David N. Minor	Rep.	Rubicon	January 7, 1861	January 6, 1862	14th
Harvey C. Griffin	Dem.	Oak Grove	January 6, 1862	January 1, 1863	15th
Oscar F. Jones	Dem.	Juneau	January 1, 1863	January 1, 1866	16th 17th 18th
Hiram Sawyer	Dem.	Burnett	January 1, 1866	January 7, 1867	19th
Warren Marston	Dem.	Lomira	January 7, 1867	January 6, 1868	20th
Charles E. Goodwin	Dem.	Mayville	January 6, 1868	January 4, 1869	21st
Arthur K. Delaney	Dem.	Horicon	January 4, 1869	January 3, 1870	22nd
Henry S. Burtch	Dem.	Williamstown	January 3, 1870	January 2, 1871	23rd
William Rusch	Dem.	Herman	January 2, 1871	January 1, 1872	24th
Allen Hiram Atwater	Rep.	Oak Grove	January 1, 1872	January 6, 1873	25th
Wilfred C. Fuller	Dem.	Chester	January 6, 1873	January 5, 1874	26th
Darius L. Bancroft	Rep.	Chester	January 5, 1874	January 4, 1875	27th
John Lloyd	Rep.	Clyman	January 4, 1875	January 3, 1876	28th
George H. Lawrence	Rep.	Burnett	January 3, 1876	January 1, 1877	29th
Leander H. Shepard	Rep.	Burnett	January 1, 1877	January 7, 1878	30th
Eli Hawks	Rep.	Juneau	January 7, 1878	January 6, 1879	31st
James Davison	Dem.	Chester	January 6, 1879	January 5, 1880	32nd
DeWitt C. Williams	Rep.	Waunakee	January 5, 1880	January 3, 1881	33rd
George Jess	Rep.	Waupun	January 3, 1881	January 2, 1882	34th
Samuel McDowell	Rep.	Fox Lake	January 2, 1882	January 1, 1883	35th
Henry Spiering	Dem.	Mayville	January 1, 1883	January 5, 1885	36th
Andrew Bachhuber	Dem.	Lomira	January 5, 1885	January 3, 1887	37th
Henry Spiering	Ind.D.	Mayville	January 3, 1887	January 7, 1889	38th
John A. Barney	Dem.	Mayville	January 7, 1889	January 5, 1891	39th
William S. Schwefel	Dem.	Lebanon	January 5, 1891	January 7, 1895	40th 41st
William Jeche	Dem.	Hustisford	January 7, 1895	January 4, 1897	42nd
District abolished by 1896 Wisconsin Special Session Act 1 Dodge County was consolidated into the Dodge 1st and Dodge 2nd Assembly districts
