= 7th Wisconsin Legislature =

Wisconsin legislative term for 1854

| ← | 6th | 8th | → |
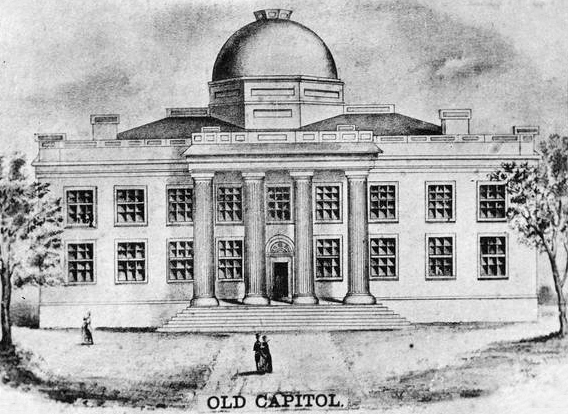
- Wisconsin State Capitol, 1855

Overview
- Legislative body: Wisconsin Legislature
- Meeting place: Wisconsin State Capitol
- Term: January 2, 1854 – January 1, 1855
- Election: November 8, 1853

Senate
- Members: 25
- Senate President: James T. Lewis (W)
- President pro tempore: Benjamin Allen (D)
- Party control: Democratic

Assembly
- Members: 82
- Assembly Speaker: Frederick W. Horn (D)
- Party control: Democratic

Sessions
- 1st: January 11, 1854 – April 3, 1854

The Seventh Wisconsin Legislature convened from January 11, 1854, to April 3, 1854, in regular session.

Senators representing even-numbered districts were newly elected for this session and were serving the first year of a two-year term. Assemblymembers were elected to a one-year term. Assemblymembers and odd-numbered senators were elected in the general election of November 8, 1853. Senators representing odd-numbered districts were serving the second year of their two-year term, having been elected in the general election held on November 2, 1852.

The governor of Wisconsin during this entire term was Democrat William A. Barstow, of Waukesha County, serving the first year of a two-year term, having won election in the 1853 Wisconsin gubernatorial election.

== Major events ==
- January 2, 1854: Inauguration of William A. Barstow as the 3rd Governor of Wisconsin.
- March 11, 1854: A mob of several hundred people led by abolitionist Sherman Booth broke into the Milwaukee County jail and liberated Joshua Glover, who had been ambushed and imprisoned the previous day by a cohort of slave catchers acting on the Fugitive Slave Act of 1850.
- March 20, 1854: A local meeting was held at Ripon, Wisconsin, to oppose the proposed Kansas–Nebraska Act—later cited as the birth of the Republican Party.
- May 30, 1854: U.S. President Franklin Pierce signed the Kansas–Nebraska Act.
- July 13, 1854: The Republican Party of Wisconsin was established at a convention in Madison, Wisconsin.
- November 7, 1854: Wisconsin voters rejected three amendments to the Constitution of Wisconsin which would have doubled legislative terms and instituted biennial legislative sessions.

== Major legislation ==
- January 30, 1854: Act to organize the County of Trempe a l'eau, 1854 Act 2
- February 9, 1854: Act to organize the County of Dunn, 1854 Act 7
- February 11, 1854: Act to divide La Pointe county and create the county of Douglass, 1854 Act 10
- March 6, 1854: Act to divide the sixth Judicial Circuit and organize an eighth Judicial Circuit, and to fix the time for holding the Circuit Courts in the Counties of the respective circuits, 1854 Act 13
- March 24, 1854: Act to divide the county of La Crosse and organize the county of Monroe, 1854 Act 35
- March 30, 1854: Act concerning the terms of office of Judges of the several courts of this State, 1854 Act 41. Standardized state judicial terms as starting the first Monday of the year following the election of that judge.
- March 31, 1854: Act to provide for the appointment of an Assistant Secretary of State and Assistant State Treasurer, and to prescribe their duties, 1854 Act 65
- April 24, 1854: Act to divide the second and third Judicial Circuits and organize the ninth Judicial Circuit, and to fix the time of holding the Circuit Courts in the Counties of said respective Circuits, 1854 Act 75
- April 25, 1854: Act to amend Article Four of the Constitution, 1854 Act 89. Created a referendum to modify the lengths of State Senate terms from two years to four years, and for the Assembly from one year to two years, and to change the Legislative sessions from one year to two years. The referendum was rejected by voters in November.

== Party summary ==
=== Senate summary ===
Senate Partisan composition Democratic: 22 seats Whig: 3 seats

| | Party (Shading indicates majority caucus) | | | | | Total | |
| | Dem. | F.S. | Whig | Ind. | Rep. | Total | Vacant |
|---|---|---|---|---|---|---|---|
| End of previous Legislature | 19 | 0 | 6 | 0 | 0 | 25 | 0 |
| Start of 1st Session | 22 | 0 | 3 | 0 | 0 | 25 | 0 |
| Final voting share | 88.00% | 0.0% | 12.00% | 0.0% | 0.0% | | |
| Beginning of the next Legislature | 13 | 0 | 0 | 1 | 11 | 25 | 0 |

=== Assembly summary ===
Assembly Partisan composition Democratic: 51 seats Free Soil: 4 seats Whig: 27 seats

| | Party (Shading indicates majority caucus) | | | | | Total | |
| | Dem. | F.S. | Whig | Ind. | Rep. | Total | Vacant |
|---|---|---|---|---|---|---|---|
| End of previous Legislature | 55 | 7 | 20 | 0 | 0 | 82 | 0 |
| 1st Session | 51 | 4 | 27 | 0 | 0 | 82 | 0 |
| Final voting share | 62.20% | 4.88% | 32.92% | 0.0% | 0.0% | | |
| Beginning of the next Legislature | 34 | 0 | 0 | 4 | 44 | 82 | 0 |

== Sessions ==
- 1st Regular session: January 11, 1854 – April 3, 1854

== Leaders ==
=== Senate leadership ===
- President of the Senate: James T. Lewis, Lieutenant Governor
- President pro tempore: Benjamin Allen

=== Assembly leadership ===
- Speaker of the Assembly: Frederick W. Horn

== Members ==
=== Members of the Senate ===
Members of the Wisconsin Senate for the Seventh Wisconsin Legislature:

Senate partisan representation Democratic: 22 seats Whig: 3 seats

| District | Counties | Senator | Party | Residence |
|---|---|---|---|---|
| 01 | Calumet, Manitowoc, Sheboygan | Horatio N. Smith | Dem. | Plymouth |
| 02 | Brown, Door, Kewaunee, Marathon, Oconto, Outagamie, Portage, Waupaca | Joseph F. Loy | Dem. | De Pere |
| 03 | Ozaukee | Andrew M. Blair | Dem. | Ozaukee |
| 04 | Washington | Baltus Mantz | Dem. | Meeker |
| 05 | Milwaukee (Northern Half) | Edward M. Hunter | Dem. | Milwaukee |
| 06 | Milwaukee (Southern Half) | Edward McGarry | Dem. | Milwaukee |
| 07 | Racine | John W. Cary | Dem. | Racine |
| 08 | Kenosha | Levi Grant | Dem. | Kenosha |
| 09 | Waukesha (Northern Half) | George R. McLane | Dem. | Hartland |
| 10 | Waukesha (Southern Half) | James D. Reymert | Dem. | Denoon |
| 11 | Dane | Thomas T. Whittlesey | Dem. | Pheasant Branch |
| 12 | Walworth | Eleazer Wakeley | Dem. | Whitewater |
| 13 | Lafayette | Charles Dunn | Dem. | Cottage Inn |
| 14 | Jefferson | Daniel Howell | Dem. | Jefferson |
| 15 | Iowa, Richland | Levi Sterling | Whig | Mineral Point |
| 16 | Grant | Nelson Dewey | Dem. | Lancaster |
| 17 | Rock (Western Half) | Ezra Miller | Dem. | Spring Valley |
| 18 | Rock (Eastern Half) | Louis P. Harvey | Whig | Shopiere |
| 19 | Bad Ax, Buffalo, Chippewa, Clark, Crawford, Jackson, La Crosse, La Pointe, Pierce, Polk, St. Croix | Benjamin Allen | Dem. | Hudson |
| 20 | Fond du Lac | Charles A. Eldredge | Dem. | Fond du Lac |
| 21 | Winnebago | Coles Bashford | Whig | Oshkosh |
| 22 | Dodge | Ezra A. Bowen | Dem. | Mayville |
| 23 | Adams, Marquette, Sauk, Waushara | David S. Vittum | Dem. | Baraboo |
| 24 | Green | Francis H. West | Dem. | Monroe |
| 25 | Columbia | John Q. Adams | Whig | Fall River |

=== Members of the Assembly ===
Members of the Assembly for the Seventh Wisconsin Legislature (82):

Assembly partisan representation Democratic: 51 seats Free Soil: 4 seats Whig: 27 seats

| Senate District | County | District | Representative | Party | Residence |
|---|---|---|---|---|---|
| 23 | Adams & Sauk | | Cyrus C. Remington | Dem. | Baraboo |
| 19 | Bad Ax & Crawford | | William F. Terhune | Dem. | Viroqua |
| 02 | Brown, Door, & Kewaunee | | Francis X. Desnoyers | Whig | Green Bay |
| 19 | Buffalo, Chippewa, Clark, Jackson, & La Crosse | | William J. Gibson | Dem. | Black River Falls |
| 01 | Calumet | | Alexander H. Hart | Dem. | Lima |
| 25 | Columbia | 1 | Asa C. Ketchum | Dem. | Portage |
| 25 | Columbia | 2 | Alfred Topliff | Whig | East Hampden |
| 11 | Dane | 1 | Charles R. Head | Whig | Albion |
| 11 | Dane | 2 | Samuel H. Baker | Dem. | Bristol |
| 11 | Dane | 3 | Peter W. Matts | Whig | Montrose |
| 11 | Dane | 4 | Harry Barnes | Dem. | Middleton |
| 11 | Dane | 5 | Harlow S. Orton | Whig | Madison |
| 22 | Dodge | 1st | Benjamin F. Barney | Dem. | Mayville |
| 22 | Dodge | 2nd | George Fox | Dem. | Herman |
| 22 | Dodge | 3rd | Francis McCormick | Dem. | Ashippun |
| 22 | Dodge | 4th | Ruel Parker | Dem. | Portland |
| 22 | Dodge | 5th | John W. Davis | Dem. | Fox Lake |
| 22 | Dodge | 6th | Allen Hiram Atwater | Whig | Oak Grove |
| 20 | Fond du Lac | 1 | Nicholas M. Donaldson | Whig | Fond du Lac |
| 20 | Fond du Lac | 2 | Edward Boener | Dem. | Waupun |
| 20 | Fond du Lac | 3 | Isaac S. Tallmadge | Dem. | Fond du Lac |
| 20 | Fond du Lac | 4 | Major J. Thomas | Dem. | Ashford |
| 16 | Grant | 1 | Lewis Rood | Whig | Hazel Green |
| 16 | Grant | 2 | William Hull | Dem. | Potosi |
| 16 | Grant | 3 | Edward Estabrook | Whig | Platteville |
| 16 | Grant | 4 | William Jeffrey | Dem. | Ellenboro |
| 16 | Grant | 5 | Milas K. Young | Whig | Cassville |
| 24 | Green | | Abner Mitchell | Whig | Spring Grove |
| 15 | Iowa | 1 | Lemuel W. Joiner | Whig | Wyoming |
| 15 | Iowa | 2 | John Toay | Whig | Mineral Point |
| 14 | Jefferson | 1 | Theodore Bernhardt | Dem. | Watertown |
| 14 | Jefferson | 2 | William Eustis | Whig | Oakland |
| 14 | Jefferson | 3 | David L. Morrison | Dem. | Fort Atkinson |
| 14 | Jefferson | 4 | Charles J. Bell | Whig | Johnson Creek |
| 14 | Jefferson | 5 | Darius Reed | Whig | Sullivan |
| 08 | Kenosha | 1 | Samuel Hale Jr. | Free Soil | Kenosha |
| 08 | Kenosha | 2 | Jesse Hooker | Whig | Salem |
| 13 | Lafayette | 1 | James H. Earnest | Dem. | New Diggings |
| 13 | Lafayette | 2 | James H. Knowlton | Dem. | Shullsburg |
| 13 | Lafayette | 3 | Peter Parkinson | Dem. | Fayette |
| 19 | La Pointe, Pierce, Polk, St. Croix | | William M. Torbert | Dem. | Hudson |
| 01 | Manitowoc | | James L. Kyle | Whig | Manitowoc |
| 02 | Marathon & Portage | | Walter D. McIndoe | Whig | Wausau |
| 23 | Marquette & Waushara | 1 | Archibald Nichols | Whig | Markesan |
| 23 | Marquette & Waushara | 2 | Samuel McCracken | Dem. | Marquette |
| 05 | Milwaukee | 1 | Jackson Hadley | Dem. | Milwaukee |
| 05 | Milwaukee | 2 | William Reinhardt | Dem. | Milwaukee |
| 06 | Milwaukee | 3 | Edward O'Neill | Dem. | Milwaukee |
| 06 | Milwaukee | 4 | Henry Beecroft | Dem. | Milwaukee |
| 06 | Milwaukee | 5 | William E. Webster | Dem. | Milwaukee |
| 06 | Milwaukee | 6 | Timothy Hagerty | Dem. | Franklin |
| 06 | Milwaukee | 7 | Peter Lavies | Dem. | Greenfield |
| 05 | Milwaukee | 8 | John Crawford | Dem. | Milwaukee |
| 05 | Milwaukee | 9 | John Tobin | Dem. | Granville |
| 02 | Oconto–Outagamie–Waupaca | | John B. Jacobs (rem. Jan. 14) | Dem. | Menomonee |
| 02 | Oconto–Outagamie–Waupaca | | David Scott (from Jan. 14) | Dem. | Waupaca |
| 03 | Ozaukee | 1 | Miles M. Whedon | Whig | Ozaukee |
| 03 | Ozaukee | 2 | Frederick W. Horn | Dem. | Ozaukee |
| 07 | Racine | 1 | Charles S. Wright | Dem. | Racine |
| 07 | Racine | 2 | John Smith | Dem. | Caledonia |
| 07 | Racine | 3 | Thomas West | Dem. | Raymond |
| 07 | Racine | 4 | Nelson R. Norton | Dem. | Burlington |
| 15 | Richland | | Nathaniel Wheeler | Dem. | Richland Center |
| 18 | Rock | 1 | Samuel G. Colley | Free Soil | Beloit |
| 18 | Rock | 2 | Joseph Spaulding | Free Soil | Harmony |
| 17 | Rock | 3 | David Noggle | Dem. | Janesville |
| 17 | Rock | 4 | John L. V. Thomas | Dem. | Beloit |
| 01 | Sheboygan | 1 | Adolph Rosenthal | Dem. | Sheboygan |
| 01 | Sheboygan | 2 | John Mathes | Dem. | Rhein |
| 12 | Walworth | 1 | Anderson Whiting | Whig | Richmond |
| 12 | Walworth | 2 | Perry G. Harrington | Dem. | Sugar Creek |
| 12 | Walworth | 3 | Oscar F. Bartlett | Free Soil | East Troy |
| 12 | Walworth | 4 | Simeon W. Spafard | Dem. | Geneva |
| 12 | Walworth | 5 | William P. Allen | Whig | Sharon |
| 12 | Walworth | 6 | Phipps W. Lake | Whig | Walworth |
| 04 | Washington | 1 | Phillip Zimmerman | Dem. | Germantown |
| 04 | Washington | 2 | Adam Schantz | Dem. | Addison |
| 09 | Waukesha | 1 | Denison Worthington | Whig | Summit |
| 09 | Waukesha | 2 | Chauncey H. Purple | Whig | Brookfield |
| 10 | Waukesha | 3 | Edward Lees | Dem. | Ottawa |
| 10 | Waukesha | 4 | Jesse Smith | Whig | Vernon |
| 21 | Winnebago | 1 | George Gary | Whig | Oshkosh |
| 21 | Winnebago | 2 | Corydon L. Rich | Dem. | Vinland |

== Employees ==
=== Senate employees ===
- Chief Clerk: Samuel G. Bugh
- Sergeant-at-Arms: J. M. Sherwood

=== Assembly employees ===
- Chief Clerk: Thomas McHugh
- Sergeant-at-Arms: William H. Gleason
