= Wisconsin's Dodge County 2nd Assembly district =

Former American legislative district

Wisconsin's Dodge County 2nd State Assembly district
- Obsolete
- Notes: 1848–1972

Wisconsin's Dodge County 2nd Assembly district was a district in the Wisconsin State Assembly for most of the history of the state of Wisconsin, up to the legislative redistricting reforms of 1972 which created the current numbered districts. Located in central Wisconsin, the district was one of the 66 original Assembly districts defined in Article XIV of the Constitution of Wisconsin. The Constitution originally allocated five districts for Dodge County, Wisconsin; this district originally comprised parts of central Dodge County.

The district was in use for the first 124 years of Wisconsin's history, from 1848 to 1972.

== List of representatives ==
List of representatives from the Dodge County 2nd district
Member	Party	Residence	Term start	Term end	Leg.
District created
Charles Billinghurst	Dem.	Juneau	June 5, 1848	January 1, 1849	1st
Hiram Barber	Dem.	Oak Grove	January 1, 1849	January 7, 1850	2nd
James Murdock	Dem.	Neosho	January 7, 1850	January 6, 1851	3rd
Asa W. French	Dem.	Herman	January 6, 1851	January 5, 1852	4th
Timothy B. Sterling	Whig	Iron Ridge	January 5, 1852	January 3, 1853	5th
Whitman Sayles	Dem.	Rubicon	January 3, 1853	January 2, 1854	6th
George Fox	Dem.	Herman	January 2, 1854	January 1, 1855	7th
John B. Ribble	Dem.	Horicon	January 1, 1855	January 7, 1856	8th
Daniel Fletcher	Dem.	Hustisford	January 7, 1856	January 5, 1857	9th
Peter Potter	Dem.	LeRoy	January 5, 1857	January 4, 1858	10th
Narcisse Juneau	Dem.	Theresa	January 4, 1858	January 3, 1859	11th
John C. Bishop	Dem.	LeRoy	January 3, 1859	January 2, 1860	12th
Max Bachhuber	Dem.	Farmersville	January 2, 1860	January 7, 1861	13th
Jacob Bodden	Dem.	Theresa	January 7, 1861	January 6, 1862	14th
John F. McCollum	Dem.	Trenton	January 6, 1862	January 4, 1864	15th 16th
William H. Green	Union	Stoughton	January 4, 1864	January 2, 1865	17th
Michael F. Lowth	Dem.	Beaver Dam	January 2, 1865	January 1, 1866	18th
Andrew Willard	Union	Beaver Dam	January 1, 1866	January 7, 1867	19th
James B. Hays	Dem.	Juneau	January 7, 1867	January 6, 1868	20th
Lewis M. Benson	Dem.	Lowell	January 6, 1868	January 4, 1869	21st
Rees Evans	Dem.	Beaver Dam	January 4, 1869	January 3, 1870	22nd
Francis Johnston	Dem.	Chester	January 3, 1870	January 2, 1871	23rd
Allen Hiram Atwater	Rep.	Oak Grove	January 2, 1871	January 1, 1872	24th
Calvin E. Lewis	Rep.	Beaver Dam	January 1, 1872	January 6, 1873	25th
John Runkel	Dem.	Lowell	January 6, 1873	January 5, 1874	26th
David C. Gowdey	Dem.	Beaver Dam	January 5, 1874	January 4, 1875	27th
David M. Coleman	Rep.	Lowell	January 4, 1875	January 3, 1876	28th
Columbus Germain	Dem.	Beaver Dam	January 3, 1876	January 1, 1877	29th
Francis Newhauser	Ref.	Lomira	January 1, 1877	January 7, 1878	30th
Peter Langenfeld	Dem.	Theresa	January 7, 1878	January 6, 1879	31st
Henry Spiering	Dem.	Mayville	January 6, 1879	January 5, 1880	32nd
Joseph Heimerl	Dem.	Farmersville	January 5, 1880	January 3, 1881	33rd
William Liscow	Dem.	Iron Ridge	January 3, 1881	January 2, 1882	34th
Benjamin P. Bishop	Dem.	Brownsville	January 2, 1882	January 1, 1883	35th
Eli Hawks	Rep.	Juneau	January 1, 1883	January 5, 1885	36th
John Leslie	Dem.	Juneau	January 5, 1885	January 3, 1887	37th
Culver Hooker	Rep.	Waupun	January 3, 1887	January 7, 1889	38th
John Stoddart	Dem.	Fox Lake	January 7, 1889	January 5, 1891	39th
Bennett E. Sampson	Dem.	Oakfield	January 5, 1891	January 2, 1893	40th
Michael E. Burke	Dem.	Beaver Dam	January 2, 1893	January 7, 1895	41st
Henry Gilmore	Dem.	Beaver Dam	January 7, 1895	January 4, 1897	42nd
Samuel R. Webster	Rep.	Elba	January 4, 1897	January 2, 1899	43rd
Henry S. Gilmore	Dem.	Beaver Dam	January 2, 1899	January 7, 1901	44th
Josephus Williams	Dem.	Fox Lake	January 7, 1901	January 5, 1903	45th
Daniel L. Hannifin	Dem.	Portland	January 5, 1903	January 7, 1907	46th 47th
John F. Hughes	Dem.	Reeseville	January 7, 1907	January 2, 1911	48th 49th
Henry E. Krueger	Dem.	Beaver Dam	January 2, 1911	January 4, 1915	50th 51st
Joseph Biel	Dem.	Westford	January 4, 1915	January 1, 1917	52nd
Samuel R. Webster	Rep.	Elba	January 1, 1917	January 3, 1921	53rd 54th
Fred E. Moul	Rep.	Burnett	January 3, 1921	January 3, 1927	55th 56th 57th
Philip J. Zink	Dem.	Beaver Dam	January 3, 1927	January 7, 1929	58th
Fred E. Moul	Rep.	Burnett	January 7, 1929	January 5, 1931	59th
Ira E. Burtis	Rep.	Beaver Dam	January 5, 1931	January 2, 1933	60th
Henry E. Krueger	Dem.	Beaver Dam	January 2, 1933	January 2, 1939	61st 62nd 63rd
William E. Jones	Rep.	Beaver Dam	January 2, 1939	January 4, 1943	64th 65th
Jesse A. Canniff	Rep.	Beaver Dam	January 4, 1943	January 3, 1949	66th 67th 68th
Elmer C. Nitschke	Rep.	Burnett	January 3, 1949	January 4, 1971	69th 70th 71st 72nd 73rd 74th 75th 76th 77th 78th 79th
Thomas S. Hanson	Dem.	Beaver Dam	January 4, 1971	January 1, 1973	80th
District abolished by 1971 Wisconsin Act 304; Dodge County was divided between the 53rd, 54th, 72nd, and 81st Assembly districts The Dodge County 2nd district did not have a close analogue in the new map
