= 6th Wisconsin Legislature =

Wisconsin legislative term for 1853

←	5th	7th	→
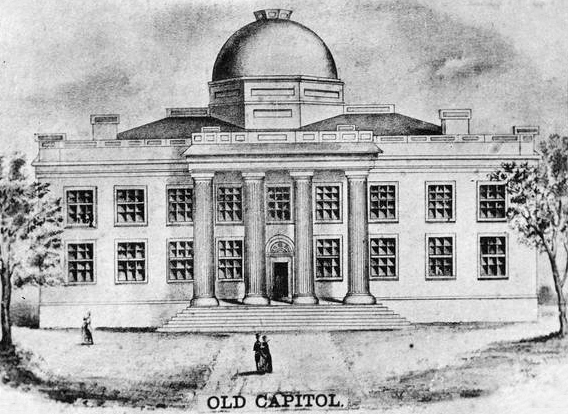
- Wisconsin State Capitol, 1855

Overview
- Legislative body: Wisconsin Legislature
- Meeting place: Wisconsin State Capitol
- Term: January 3, 1853 – January 2, 1854
- Election: November 2, 1852

Senate
- Members: 25
- Senate President: Timothy Burns^{Until September 21, 1853}
- President pro tempore: Duncan Reed
- Party control: Democratic

Assembly
- Members: 82
- Assembly Speaker: Henry L. Palmer
- Party control: Democratic

Sessions
- 1st: January 12, 1853 – April 4, 1853
- Special: June 6, 1853 – July 13, 1853

The Sixth Wisconsin Legislature convened from January 12, 1853, to April 4, 1853, in regular session. They reconvened from June 6 to July 13 to sit as a court of impeachment for Wisconsin Circuit Court Judge Levi Hubbell.

This was the first legislative session after the first expansion and redistricting of the Senate and Assembly. The Senate grew from 19 to 25 seats; the Assembly grew from 66 to 82 seats.

Senators representing odd-numbered districts were newly elected for this session and were serving the first year of a two-year term. Assemblymembers were elected to a one-year term. Assemblymembers and odd-numbered senators were elected in the general election of November 2, 1852. Senators representing even-numbered districts were serving the second year of their two-year term, having been elected in the general election held on November 4, 1851, or were elected in the 1852 election for a newly created district and were serving a one-year term.

The governor of Wisconsin during this entire term was Whig Leonard J. Farwell, of Dane County, serving the second year of a two-year term, having won election in the 1851 Wisconsin gubernatorial election. He was Wisconsin's only Whig governor.

== Major events ==
- March 4, 1853: Inauguration of Franklin Pierce as the 14th President of the United States.
- March 5, 1853: Wisconsin State Assembly voted to impeach Wisconsin Circuit Court Judge Levi Hubbell.
- July 11, 1853: Judge Levi Hubbell was acquitted in a trial of impeachment in the Wisconsin State Senate.
- September 21, 1853: Lieutenant Governor Timothy Burns died in office.
- November 8, 1853: William A. Barstow elected Governor of Wisconsin.

== Major legislation ==
- February 11, 1853: Act to divide the County of La Crosse and create the County of Jackson, 1853 Act 8
- February 16, 1853: Act to incorporate the County of Shawanaw, 1853 Act 9
- March 4, 1853: Act to incorporate the State Historical Society of Wisconsin, 1853 Act 17
- March 7, 1853: Act for the division of the county of Washington, and the creation of the county of Ozaukee, 1853 Act 21
- March 14, 1853: Act to divide Saint Croix, and create the counties of Pierce and Polk, 1853 Act 31
- March 19, 1853: Act to organize a Seventh Judicial Circuit, and to provide for the election of a Judge thereof, 1853 Act 40
- March 19, 1853: Act to provide for contesting elections of members of the Senate and Assembly, 1853 Act 41
- March 25, 1853: Act providing for the Geological Survey of the State, 1853 Act 47
- April 2, 1853: Act providing for the organization of Joint Stock Companies, 1853 Act 68
- June 6, 1853: Act to amend article four of the Constitution, 1853 Act 95, to change state senate terms from two years to four years. This act was eventually put to a referendum in 1854, where it was defeated by a 2-to-1 margin.
- July 6, 1853: Act to divide the county of Jackson, and create the counties of Buffalo and Clarke, 1853 Act 100
- July 6, 1853: Act to submit to the people the question of a Prohibitory Liquor Law, 1853 Act 101
- July 12, 1853: Act to provide for the punishment of murder in the first degree, and to abolish the penalty of death, 1853 Act 103. With this act, Wisconsin became the first U.S. state to abolish the death penalty.

== Party summary ==
=== Senate summary ===
Senate Partisan composition Democratic: 19 seats Whig: 6 seats

	Party (Shading indicates majority caucus)			Total	
	Dem.	F.S.	Whig	Total	Vacant
End of previous Legislature	12	1	6	19	0
Start of 1st Session	19	0	6	25	0
from May 1	18	0	6	24	1
from June 8	19	0	6	25	0
Final voting share	68%	0%	32%		
Beginning of the next Legislature	22	0	3	25	0

=== Assembly summary ===
Assembly Partisan composition Democratic: 55 seats Free Soil: 7 seats Whig: 20 seats

	Party (Shading indicates majority caucus)			Total	
	Dem.	F.S.	Whig	Total	Vacant
End of previous Legislature	28	6	32	66	0
1st Session	55	7	20	82	0
Final voting share	67%	9%	24%		
Beginning of the next Legislature	51	4	27	82	0

== Sessions ==
- 1st Regular session: January 12, 1853 – April 4, 1853
- Special Impeachment session: June 6, 1853 – July 13, 1853

== Leaders ==
=== Senate leadership ===
- President of the Senate: Timothy Burns, Lieutenant Governor (Until his death, September 21, 1853)
- President pro tempore: Duncan Reed

=== Assembly leadership ===
- Speaker of the Assembly: Henry L. Palmer

== Members ==
=== Members of the Senate ===
Members of the Wisconsin Senate for the Sixth Wisconsin Legislature (25):

Senate Partisan representation Democratic: 19 seats Whig: 6 seats

District	Counties	Senator	Party	Residence
01	Calumet, Manitowoc, Sheboygan	Horatio N. Smith	Dem.	Sheboygan
02	Brown, Door, Oconto, Outagamie, Marathon, Portage, Waupaca	James S. Alban	Whig	Plover
03	Washington (Eastern Part)	Andrew M. Blair	Dem.	Fond du Lac
04	Washington (Western Part)	Baruch S. Weil	Dem.	West Bend
05	Milwaukee (Northern Half)	Edward M. Hunter	Dem.	Milwaukee
06	Milwaukee (Southern Half)	Duncan C. Reed	Dem.	Milwaukee
07	Racine	John W. Cary	Dem.	Racine
08	Kenosha	John R. Sharpstein	Dem.	Milwaukee
09	Waukesha (Northern Half)	George R. McLane	Dem.	Summit
10	Waukesha (Southern Half)	Marvin H. Bovee	Dem.	Waukesha
11	Dane	Thomas T. Whittlesey	Dem.	Madison
12	Walworth	Eleazer Wakeley	Dem.	Whitewater
13	Lafayette	Charles Dunn	Dem.	Belmont
14	Jefferson	Alva Stewart	Whig	Fort Atkinson
15	Iowa, Richland	Levi Sterling	Whig	Mount Sterling
16	Grant	Joel C. Squires (Until May 1)	Dem.	Lancaster
16	Grant	James W. Seaton (From June 8)	Dem.	Potosi
17	Rock (Western Half)	Ezra Miller	Dem.	Beloit
18	Rock (Eastern Half)	John R. Briggs Jr.	Whig	Beloit
19	Bad Ax, Chippewa, Crawford, La Crosse, La Pointe, St. Croix	Benjamin Allen	Dem.	Pepin
20	Fond du Lac	Bertine Pinckney	Dem.	Rosendale
21	Winnebago	Coles Bashford	Whig	Oshkosh
22	Dodge	Judson Prentice	Whig	Watertown
23	Adams, Marquette, Sauk, Waushara	David S. Vittum	Dem.	Baraboo
24	Green	Thomas S. Bowen	Dem.	Waupun
25	Columbia	James T. Lewis	Dem.	Columbus

=== Members of the Assembly ===
Members of the Assembly for the Sixth Wisconsin Legislature (82):

Assembly Partisan representation Democratic: 55 seats Free Soil: 7 seats Whig: 20 seats

Senate District	County	District	Representative	Party	Redidence
23	Adams, Sauk		Charles Armstrong	Whig	Baraboo
19	Bad Ax, Crawford		Hiram A. Wright	Dem.	Prairie du Chien
02	Brown, Door, Kewaunee		Randall Wilcox	Dem.	De Pere
01	Calumet		James Robinson	Dem.	Chilton
19	Chippewa, La Crosse		Albert D. La Due	Dem.	La Crosse
25	Columbia	1	Orrin D. Coleman	Dem.	Marcellon
25	Columbia	2	John Q. Adams	Whig	Fall River
11	Dane	1	Perez C. Burdick	Dem.	Albion
11	Dane	2	Henry L. Foster	Dem.	Deerfield
11	Dane	3	Storer W. Field	Whig	Fitchburg
11	Dane	4	Harry Barnes	Dem.	Middleton
11	Dane	5	Mathew Roche	Dem.	Westport
22	Dodge	1st	Edward N. Foster	Whig	Mayville
22	Dodge	2nd	Whitman Sayles	Dem.	Rubicon
22	Dodge	3rd	William M. Dennis	Dem.	Watertown
22	Dodge	4th	Patrick Kelly	Dem.	Elba
22	Dodge	5th	John W. Davis	Dem.	Fox Lake
22	Dodge	6th	Edwin Hillyer	Dem.	Waupun
20	Fond du Lac	1	Nicholas M. Donaldson	Whig	Waupun
20	Fond du Lac	2	Charles D. Gage	Dem.	New Fane
20	Fond du Lac	3	Isaac S. Tallmadge	Dem.	Fond du Lac
20	Fond du Lac	4	Querin Loehr	Dem.	Calumet
16	Grant	1	Henry D. York	Whig	Hazel Green
16	Grant	2	Hyman E. Block	Whig	Potosi
16	Grant	3	Titus Hayes	Whig	Platteville
16	Grant	4	J. Allen Barber	Whig	Lancaster
16	Grant	5	Jeremiah Dodge	Dem.	Lancaster
24	Green		Thomas Fenton	Dem.	Attica
15	Iowa	1	Henry Madden	Dem.	Dodgeville
15	Iowa	2	Phillip W. Thomas	Whig	Mineral Point
14	Jefferson	1	Patrick Rogan	Dem.	Watertown
14	Jefferson	2	James H. Ostrander	Whig	Aztalan
14	Jefferson	3	John Edwin Holmes	Dem.	Jefferson
14	Jefferson	4	William W. Woodman	Dem.	Farmington
14	Jefferson	5	David J. Powers	Whig	Palmyra
08	Kenosha	1	C. Latham Sholes	Free Soil	Kenosha
08	Kenosha	2	James C. McKisson	Dem.	Wheatland
13	Lafayette	1	Eli Robinson	Dem.	Benton
13	Lafayette	2	Philemon Simpson	Dem.	Shullsburg
13	Lafayette	3	Nathan Olmsted	Dem.	Cottage Inn
19	La Pointe & St. Croix		Orrin T. Maxson	Dem.	Prescott
01	Manitowoc		Ezekiel Ricker	Dem.	Manitowoc
02	Marathon & Portage		George W. Cate	Dem.	Amherst
23	Marquette & Waushara	1	Edwin B. Kelsey	Dem.	Montello
23	Marquette & Waushara	2	Ezra Wheeler	Dem.	Berlin
05	Milwaukee	1	John Hubbard Tweedy	Whig	Milwaukee
05	Milwaukee	2	Herman Haertel (until May)	Dem.	Milwaukee
05	Milwaukee	2	R. N. Messenger (from June 5)	Dem.	Milwaukee
06	Milwaukee	3	Edward McGarry	Dem.	Milwaukee
06	Milwaukee	4	Henry L. Palmer	Dem.	Milwaukee
06	Milwaukee	5	William A. Hawkins	Whig	Milwaukee
06	Milwaukee	6	Joseph Meyer	Dem.	Milwaukee
06	Milwaukee	7	Enoch Chase	Whig	Milwaukee
05	Milwaukee	8	Henry C. West	Dem.	Milwaukee
05	Milwaukee	9	Richard Carlisle	Dem.	Milwaukee
02	Oconto, Outagamie, Waupaca		Arthur Resley	Dem.	Appleton
07	Racine	1	Horace T. Sanders	Dem.	Racine
07	Racine	2	William H. Roe	Dem.	Mount Pleasant
07	Racine	3	Thomas West	Dem.	Raymond
07	Racine	4	Philo Belden	Whig	Burlington
15	Richland		Henry Conner	Dem.	Port Andrew
18	Rock	1	William D. Murray	Whig	Beloit
18	Rock	2	Harvey Holmes	Whig	Janesville
17	Rock	3	Charles Stevens	Dem.	Janesville
17	Rock	4	Harrison Stebbins	Whig	Union
01	Sheboygan	1	David Taylor	Whig	Sheboygan
01	Sheboygan	2	Charles B. Coleman	Dem.	Greenbush
12	Walworth	1	James Lauderdale	Whig	La Grange
12	Walworth	2	John Bell	Dem.	Lafayette
12	Walworth	3	Oscar F. Bartlett	Free Soil	East Troy
12	Walworth	4	Thomas W. Hill	Free Soil	Springfield
12	Walworth	5	Joseph W. Seaver	Free Soil	Darien
12	Walworth	6	Timothy H. Fellows	Free Soil	Genoa
03	Washington	1	James W. Porter	Dem.	Port Washington
03	Washington	2	Charles E. Chamberlain	Dem.	Grafton
04	Washington	3	Charles Schutte	Dem.	Meeker
04	Washington	4	William P. Barnes	Dem.	Barton
09	Waukesha	1	Orson Reed	Dem.	Summit
09	Waukesha	2	Elisha Pearl	Free Soil	Lisbon
10	Waukesha	3	Edward Lees	Dem.	Ottawa
10	Waukesha	4	Winchel D. Bacon	Free Soil	Waukesha
21	Winnebago	1	Lucas M. Miller	Dem.	Oshkosh
21	Winnebago	2	Curtis Reed	Dem.	Menasha

== Employees ==
=== Senate employees ===
- Chief Clerk: John K. Williams
- Sergeant-at-Arms: Thomas Hood

=== Assembly employees ===
- Chief Clerk: Thomas McHugh
- Sergeant-at-Arms: Richard F. Wilson

== Changes from the 5th Legislature ==
The most significant structural change to the Legislature between the 5th and 6th sessions was the reapportionment and redistricting of legislative seats. The new districts were defined in 1852 Wisconsin Act 499, passed into law in the 5th Wisconsin Legislature.

=== Senate redistricting ===
==== Summary of changes ====
- 12 districts were simply renumbered without border adjustments.
- Waukesha County went from having one senator to two (9, 10).
- Rock County went from having one senator to two (17, 18).
- Washington County went from having one senator to two (3, 4)—the territory comprising the 3rd district became a separate county, Ozaukee, during the 6th Legislature.
- Columbia County became its own senate district (25), after previously having been in a shared district with Adams, Marathon, Marquette, Portage, Sauk, and Waushara.
- Fond du Lac and Winnebago counties became separate senate districts (20, 21), after previously having been in a shared district with Waupaca.
- Adams, Marquette, Sauk, and Waushara counties became a senate district (23).
- Calumet, Manitowoc, and Sheboygan counties became a senate district (1), separating from the previous vast multi-county northeast district.
- Brown, Door, Marathon, Oconto, Outagamie, Portage, and Waupaca counties constituted the new multi-county northeast district (2).

==== Senate districts ====
Dist.	9th Legislature	10th Legislature
1	Brown, Calumet, Door, Oconto, Manitowoc, Sheboygan counties	Calumet, Manitowoc, Sheboygan counties
2	Adams, Columbia, Marathon, Marquette, Portage, Sauk, Waushara counties	Brown, Door, Marathon, Oconto, Outagamie, Portage, Waupaca counties
3	Bad Ax, Chippewa, Crawford, La Crosse, La Pointe, St. Croix	Eastern Washington County (Ozaukee County)
4	Fond du Lac, Waupaca, Winnebago counties	Western Washington County (Washington County)
5	Iowa, Richland counties	Northern Milwaukee County
6	Grant County	Southern Milwaukee County
7	Lafayette County	Racine County
8	Green County	Kenosha County
9	Dane County	Northern Waukesha County
10	Dodge County	Southern Waukesha County
11	Washington County	Dane County
12	Jefferson County	Walworth County
13	Waukesha County	Lafayette County
14	Walworth County	Jefferson County
15	Rock County	Iowa, Richland counties
16	Kenosha County	Grant County
17	Racine County	Western Rock County
18	Southern Milwaukee County	Eastern Rock County
19	Northern Milwaukee County	Bad Ax, Chippewa, Crawford, La Crosse, La Pointe, St. Croix counties
20	Did not exist in 5th Legislature	Fond du Lac County
21	Did not exist in 5th Legislature	Winnebago County
22	Did not exist in 5th Legislature	Dodge County
23	Did not exist in 5th Legislature	Adams, Marquette, Sauk, Waushara counties
24	Did not exist in 5th Legislature	Green County
25	Did not exist in 5th Legislature	Columbia County

=== Assembly redistricting ===
==== Summary of changes ====
- Columbia County went from having 1 district to 2.
- Dane County went from having 3 districts to 5.
- Dodge County went from having 5 districts to 6.
- Fond du Lac County went from having 2 districts to 4.
- Grant County went from having 4 districts to 5.
- Iowa County went from having 1 district and 1 shared district with Richland to having 2 districts.
- Jefferson County went from having 3 districts to 5.
- Lafayette County went from having 2 districts to 3.
- Marquette and Waushara counties went from sharing 1 district to sharing 2 districts.
- Milwaukee County went from having 7 districts to 9.
- Racine County went from having 3 districts to 4.
- Richland County became its own assembly district, after previously having been in a shared district with Iowa County.
- Rock County went from having 5 districts to 4.
- Walworth County went from having 5 districts to 6.
- Washington County went from having 5 districts to 4—the eastern 2 districts became Ozaukee County during the 6th Legislature.
- Waukesha County went from having 5 districts to 4.

==== Assembly districts ====
County	Districts in 5th Legislature	Districts in 6th Legislature	Change
Adams	Shared with Marathon, Portage	Shared with Sauk	Steady
Bad Ax	Shared with Chippewa, Crawford, La Crosse	Shared with Crawford	Steady
Brown	Shared with Door, Kewaunee, Oconto, Outagamie	Shared with Door, Kewaunee	Steady
Calumet	1 District	1 District	Steady
Chippewa	Shared with Bad Ax, Crawford, La Crosse	Shared with La Crosse	Steady
Columbia	1 District	2 Districts	▲
Crawford	Shared with Bad Ax, Chippewa, La Crosse	Shared with Bad Ax	Steady
Dane	3 Districts	5 Districts	▲
Dodge	5 Districts	6 Districts	▲
Door	Shared with Brown, Kewaunee, Oconto, Outagamie	Shared with Brown, Kewaunee	Steady
Fond du Lac	2 Districts	4 Districts	▲
Grant	4 Districts	5 Districts	▲
Green	1 District	1 District	Steady
Iowa	2 shared with Richland	2 Districts	▲
Jefferson	3 Districts	5 Districts	▲
Kenosha	2 Districts	2 Districts	Steady
Kewaunee	Shared with Brown, Door, Oconto, Outagamie	Shared with Brown, Door	Steady
La Crosse	Shared with Bad Ax, Chippewa, Crawford	Shared with Chippewa	Steady
La Pointe	Shared with St. Croix	Shared with St. Croix	Steady
Lafayette	2 Districts	3 Districts	▲
Manitowoc	1 District	1 District	Steady
Marathon	Shared with Adams, Portage	Shared with Portage	Steady
Marquette	Shared with Waushara	2 Shared with Waushara	▲
Milwaukee	7 Districts	9 Districts	▲
Oconto	Shared with Brown, Door, Kewaunee, Outagamie	Shared with Outagamie, Waupaca	Steady
Outagamie	Shared with Brown, Door, Kewaunee, Oconto	Shared with Oconto, Waupaca	Steady
Portage	Shared with Adams, Marathon	Shared with Marathon	Steady
Racine	3 Districts	4 Districts	▲
Richland	1 shared with Iowa	1 District	▲
Rock	5 Districts	4 Districts	▼
Sauk	1 District	Shared with Adams	▼
Sheboygan	2 Districts	2 Districts	Steady
St. Croix	Shared with La Pointe	Shared with La Pointe	Steady
Walworth	5 Districts	6 Districts	▲
Washington	5 Districts	4 Districts	▼
Waukesha	5 Districts	4 Districts	▼
Waupaca	Shared with Fond du Lac, Winnebago	Shared with Oconto, Outagamie	Steady
Waushara	Shared with Marquette	2 Shared with Marquette	▲
Winnebago	Shared with Fond du Lac, Waupaca	2 Districts	▲
