= Wisconsin's Dodge County 5th Assembly district =

Former American legislative district

Wisconsin's Dodge County 5th State Assembly district
- Obsolete
- Notes: 1848–1867

Wisconsin's Dodge County 5th Assembly district was a district in the Wisconsin State Assembly for several years in the early history of the state of Wisconsin, prior to the legislative redistricting reforms of 1972 which created the current numbered districts. Located in central Wisconsin, the district was one of the 66 original Assembly districts defined in Article XIV of the Constitution of Wisconsin. The Constitution originally allocated five districts for Dodge County, Wisconsin; this district originally comprised the northwest quadrant of Dodge County.

The district was in use for the first 18 years of Wisconsin's history, from 1848 to 1866.

== List of representatives ==
List of representatives from the Dodge County 5th district
Member	Party	Residence	Term start	Term end	Leg.
District created
Monroe Thompson	Whig	Fox Lake	June 5, 1848	January 1, 1849	1st
Parker Warren	F.S.	Beaver Dam	January 1, 1849	January 7, 1850	2nd
Malcolm Sellers	Whig	Beaver Dam	January 7, 1850	January 6, 1851	3rd
William E. Smith	Whig	Fox Lake	January 6, 1851	January 5, 1852	4th
Horace Patch	Dem.	Beaver Dam	January 5, 1852	January 3, 1853	5th
John W. Davis	Dem.	Fox Lake	January 3, 1853	January 1, 1855	6th 7th
Solomon L. Rose	Dem.	Beaver Dam	January 1, 1855	January 7, 1856	8th
Charles Burchard	Rep.	Beaver Dam	January 7, 1856	January 5, 1857	9th
A. Scott Sloan	Rep.	Beaver Dam	January 5, 1857	January 4, 1858	10th
Frederick H. Kribs	Dem.	Beaver Dam	January 4, 1858	January 3, 1859	11th
Lorenzo Merrill	Rep.	Burnett	January 3, 1859	January 2, 1860	12th
David Ordway	Rep.	Beaver Dam	January 2, 1860	January 7, 1861	13th
Frederick H. Kribs	Rep.	Beaver Dam	January 7, 1861	January 6, 1862	14th
David Hoppcock	Dem.	Rubicon	January 6, 1862	January 1, 1863	15th
Ferdinand Wagner	Dem.	Watertown	January 1, 1863	January 4, 1864	16th
John G. Daily	Dem.	Hustisford	January 4, 1864	January 2, 1865	17th
Ferdinand Gnewuch	Dem.	Hustisford	January 2, 1865	January 1, 1866	18th
William M. Morse	Dem.	Ashippun	January 1, 1866	January 7, 1867	19th
District abolished by 1866 Wisconsin Act 101; Dodge County was consolidated into the Dodge 1st, Dodge 2nd, Dodge 3rd, and Dodge 4th Assembly districts
