= Edwin Hillyer =

American businessman (1825–1908)

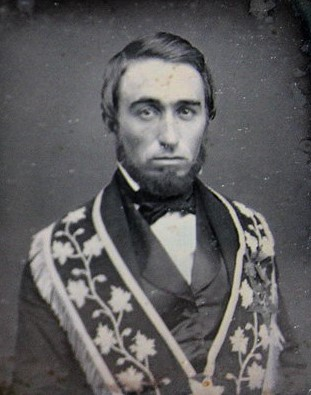
- Capt. Edwin Hillyer c. 1849

Member of the Wisconsin State Assembly from the Dodge 6th district
- In office January 3, 1853 – January 2, 1854
- Preceded by: District established
- Succeeded by: Allen Hiram Atwater

Personal details
- Born: September 30, 1825 Atwater, Ohio, U.S.
- Died: December 8, 1908 (aged 83) Saint Petersburg, Florida, U.S.
- Resting place: Forest Mound Cemetery, Waupun, Wisconsin
- Party: Democratic
- Spouse: Angeline Hillyer
- Children: 5
- Parents: David Hillyer (father); Charity Hillyer (mother)
- Profession: Businessman

Military service
- Allegiance: United States
- Branch/service: United States Volunteers; Union Army
- Years of service: 1861–1863
- Rank: Captain, USV
- Commands: 10th Reg. Wis. Vol. Infantry
- Battles/wars: American Civil War

Edwin Hillyer (September 30, 1825 – December 8, 1908) was an American businessman, Democratic politician, and Wisconsin pioneer. He was an early settler at Waupun, Wisconsin, and represented that part of northern Dodge County in the Wisconsin State Assembly during the 6th Wisconsin Legislature (1853).

== Life ==
Edwin Hillyer was born in Ohio on September 30, 1825. Edwin, along with his brother, Joseph Talcott Hillyer, settled in Waupun in 1847, eight years after Seymour Wilcox, the settlement's founder. When they first arrived, both of them worked in lumber. In 1849, Edwin and eight other Waupun settlers came down with gold fever and formed a company to travel to California. They all returned in 1852.

=== Civic Life ===
Hillyer was heavily connected to several early Waupun industries. When he returned from California, he engaged in a store business with his brother before he sold his share a few years later. He and others established the Dodge County Mutual Insurance Company, and Hillyer worked there for the entirety of its existence. In 1856, he played a major role in constructing the Milwaukee & Horicon Railroad between Waupun and Horicon. Hillyer was also a leader in the formation of the Forest Mound Cemetery.

For a time, Hillyer was the deputy warden at the Wisconsin State Prison. It was also he who directed the landscaping in front of the original building.

Hillyer had also served in the Assembly for the 6th Wisconsin Legislature. He ran as a Democrat.

==== Waupun Public Library ====
The Waupun Library Association was established in 1858 through the efforts of Hillyer and William Euen. Hillyer was the first librarian and ran the library out of his insurance office. When it began, the library only had nine feet of shelving. In 1895, citing his advanced age and the job's strenuous work, he turned the book stock over to the city. When the city took ownership of the library, the mayor appointed a new library board which included Hillyer and Lucius D. Hinkley, another prominent Waupun industrialist. He was involved in the 1904 construction of the Carnegie Library in Waupun. Hillyer served on the board until his death.

=== Military service ===
When the Civil War broke out in 1861, Hillyer raised part of two companies for the Wisconsin Volunteer Infantries. Company D. of the 3rd and Company K. of the 10th. He was appointed captain of Company K. He served until he fell ill in 1863 and resigned from his post. He was honorably discharged from the military.

=== Death and legacy ===
Edwin Hillyer died at the age of 83 on December 8, 1908.

In 1966 the Wisconsin Magazine of History published the first half of Hillyer's Gold Rush Journal, which chronicled his journey from Waupun to California.
