= Horatio N. Smith =

American politician (1820–1886)

Member of the Wisconsin Senate from the 1st district
- In office January 3, 1853 – January 1, 1855
- Preceded by: Theodore Conkey
- Succeeded by: David Taylor

Member of the Wisconsin State Assembly from the Sheboygan 1st district
- In office January 7, 1850 – January 6, 1851
- Preceded by: Harrison Carroll Hobart
- Succeeded by: Albert La Due

Personal details
- Born: March 20, 1820 Royalton, Vermont, U.S.
- Died: August 4, 1886 (aged 66) Hilbert, Wisconsin, U.S.
- Resting place: Union Cemetery Plymouth, Wisconsin
- Party: Democratic
- Spouse: Laura Anner Chase (m. 1844–1886)
- Children: Anna Ingraham (O'Brien)^{(b. 1846; died 1888)}; Stafford Smith^{(b. 1847; died 1864)}; Mary Chase (Gardam)^{(b. 1855; died 1912)}; Martha Nelson (Yenowine) (McCan)^{(b. 1861; died 1933)}; Laura Grover Smith^{(b. 1864; died 1946)}; Frances Margaret (Trottman)^{(b. 1865; died 1958)}
- Parent: Stafford Smith (father)

Horatio Nelson Smith (March 20, 1820 – August 4, 1886) was an American public administrator, Democratic politician, and Wisconsin pioneer. He served two years in the Wisconsin Senate (1853, 1854), and one year in the Wisconsin State Assembly (1850), representing Sheboygan County. Later, he served six years as warden of the Wisconsin State Prison at Waupun, Wisconsin.

== Biography ==
Horatio Nelson Smith was born on March 20, 1820, in Royalton, Vermont, son of Colonel Stafford Smith. His father was a veteran of the War of 1812.

Smith moved to Sheboygan, in the Wisconsin Territory, in 1847 and to Milwaukee, Wisconsin, in 1880.

== Career ==
Smith was elected as Democrat to the Wisconsin State Assembly for 1850 before representing the 1st Senate district in the Wisconsin State Senate from 1853 to 1855. In 1874, he was appointed Warden of the Wisconsin State Prison and remained in the job for six years. After his public service, he moved to Milwaukee and became employed with the Milwaukee & Northern Railroad, working on the northern extension of the railroad. He retired after suffering an accident in 1885.

== Personal life and family ==
Horatio Smith married Laura Anner Chase on Christmas of 1844. Chase was a granddaughter of Episcopal bishop Philander Chase, niece of U.S. Senator Dudley Chase and cousin of U.S. Representative Dudley Chase Denison, and U.S. Treasury Secretary and Chief Justice of the U.S. Supreme Court Salmon P. Chase. They had six children.

After his 1885 accident, Smith went to California with his family. On the way back he suffered a pulmonary hemorrhage. He recovered for a short time, but died on August 5, 1886, in Hilbert, Wisconsin. He was buried in Plymouth, Wisconsin, where he was a vestryman.
