= Senator Mosher =

Senator Mosher may refer to:

- Charles Adams Mosher (1906–1984), Ohio State Senate
- Lafayette F. Mosher (1824–1890), Oregon State Senate
- Orville W. Mosher (1853–1933), Wisconsin State Senate

== See also ==
- Harold G. Mosier (1889–1971), Ohio State Senate
