= Calvin E. Lewis =

American politician (1834–1926)

Calvin E. Lewis (August 26, 1834 – April 24, 1926) was a businessman and manufacturer of woolens from Wisconsin who served as a member of the Wisconsin State Assembly from Dodge County, and later was on the park board of Milwaukee.

== Background ==
Lewis was born on August 26, 1834, in Rouses Point, New York, and received a public school education. He moved to Wisconsin in 1849, initially settling in Beaver Dam, Wisconsin, and went into woolen manufacturing.

== Legislature ==
Lewis was elected to the Assembly's newly-redistricted 2nd Dodge County seat (the City of Beaver Dam, and the Towns of Beaver Dam and Lowell for the 1872 session as a Republican, with 748 votes to 603 for Democrat W. L. Parker (incumbent Allen Hiram Atwater was re-elected to the revised 3rd district). He was assigned to the standing committee on state affairs. He was not the Republican nominee in 1872, and was succeeded by Democrat John Runkel.

== Milwaukee ==
He later moved to Milwaukee, where he was involved in various civic affairs. In 1889, he was one of three purchasers of the Milwaukee Academy of Music, a theater designed by Edward Townsend Mix which in 1882 had been the first in Milwaukee to install electric lighting.

He served on that city's first park board. He died in Milwaukee in 1926, and was buried in Beaver Dam's Oakwood Cemetery.
