= Alto Dairy Cooperative =

Former dairy cooperative in Waupun, Wisconsin, US

- Type: Subsidiary
- Industry: Food
- Founded: 1894 in Waupun, Wisconsin
- Number of locations: 2
- Products: Cheese, cream, liquid veal food, whey, & whey protein concentrate
- Parent: Saputo Inc. (2008–present)
- Website: blackcreekcheese.com

Alto Dairy Cooperative (ADC) was a farmer-owned dairy cooperative in Waupun, Wisconsin. Founded in 1894, it is the oldest farmer-owned cooperative in the state of Wisconsin and boasts the nation's largest cheese producing plant east of the Mississippi River. As of 2007, ADC had two cheese plants, one in Black Creek and one in Waupun, as well as 467 employees. The cooperative has a membership of about 500 farmers. In 2007, it handled $378 million in sales and had a net income of $19.6 million.

== Sale of Alto Dairy ==
In 2008, Alto Dairy Cooperative was sold to Saputo Inc., a Canadian cheese company. Alto Dairy still operates under its original name as a subsidiary. This sale was approved by 98% of the farmers who are active in the cooperative, allowing Saputo Cheese USA, Inc. to purchase the dairy cooperative for $160 million.

== Notable achievements ==
In 2007, ADC appeared on the History channel series Modern Marvels. The show interviewed employees and filmed the production process at the Black Creek cheese plant, chosen for its diverse cheese-making abilities. Alto Dairy Colby-Jack cheese won an award at the World Championship Cheese and butter contest in 2006 and 2008. The prize-winning cheese was from the Black Creek cheese plant.
