= Waldo Lyon (Nebraska pioneer) =

American pioneer (1810–1884)

Member of the Nebraska Senate from the 6th district
- In office January 1875 – January 1877
- Preceded by: L. W. Osborn
- Succeeded by: W. C. Walton

Member of the Wisconsin State Assembly from the Dodge 3rd district
- In office January 3, 1859 – January 2, 1860
- Preceded by: Paul Juneau
- Succeeded by: Jonathan W. Nash

Personal details
- Born: 1810 Vermont, U.S.
- Died: October 17, 1884 (aged 73–74) Lyons, Nebraska, U.S.
- Resting place: Lyons Cemetery, Lyons, Nebraska
- Party: Republican; Whig (before 1854)
- Spouse: Lydia Hall (m. 1837; died 1879)
- Children: Waldo H. Lyon^{(b. 1841; died 1922)}; Mary E. (Smith)^{(b. 1845; died 1917)}; John B. Lyon^{(b. 1850)}

Waldo Lyon (1810 – October 17, 1884) was an American farmer, land speculator, and pioneer of Wisconsin and Nebraska. He was the founder and namesake of Lyons, Nebraska; a staunch advocate for temperance, he established a strict and lasting prohibition on alcohol sales within the town. He served one term in the Nebraska Senate, representing Burt and Washington counties in the 1875 term. Before moving to Nebraska, he was an early settler of Dodge County, Wisconsin, and served one term in the Wisconsin State Assembly, representing Dodge County's 3rd Assembly district during the 12th Wisconsin Legislature (1859).

== Biography ==
Waldo Lyon was born in Vermont in 1810. As a young man, Lyon resided in Connecticut.

He went west to the Wisconsin Territory in the early 1840s, and became one of the earliest settlers in what is now the town of Oak Grove, Dodge County, Wisconsin. Shortly after arriving in Wisconsin, Lyon became active with the Whig Party, and ran as a Whig Party candidate for delegate to Wisconsin's 1847–1848 constitutional convention. The Democratic slate won all three delegate slots from Dodge County.

After the ratification of the constitution in March 1848, Lyon sought the Whig nomination for Wisconsin Senate, in the 10th Senate district, but the Whig convention nominated Charles S. Bristol instead; Bristol lost the general election. A year later, the Whigs nominated Lyon as their nominee for state Senate, but he was also defeated in the 1849 general election.

Over the next several years, Lyon remained active as a leading Whig in Dodge County, but didn't make further runs for office as a Whig. During those years, he was also active in the movement to establish agricultural societies in the state, and was one of the initial officers of the Dodge and Jefferson Counties Agricultural Society.

In 1854, the Whig Party folded and the Republican Party rose up in its place. Lyon quickly adhered to the new Republican Party, and, in 1858, he was the Republican nominee for Wisconsin State Assembly in Dodge County's 3rd Assembly district. This time, Lyon was elected; he went on to serve in the 12th Wisconsin Legislature.

In 1859, there was a split within the Dodge County Republican Party, and Lyon ran for re-election as an independent candidate against the regular Republican nominee Jonathan W. Nash. Nash prevailed in the general election by 12 votes.

In 1860, Lyon briefly indicated that he would seek the Republican nomination to run for U.S. House in Wisconsin's 3rd congressional district, but ultimately his name was not announced as a candidate at the district convention, though he attended as a delegate.

During the American Civil War, Lyon remained active speaking on behalf of the Republican and Union cause.

In 1865, Lyon visited the Nebraska Territory and began acquiring land there. The following year, he led a band of Wisconsinites to Nebraska and settled at what is now Lyons, Nebraska. Waldo immediately became a leading citizen in the new settlement, owning about 480 acres in the area and establishing a grain mill there in partnership with his son.

He was a delegate to the 1871 constitutional convention in Nebraska, which attempted to draft a constitution for the new state—this attempt ended in failure. Subsequently, Lyon was elected to the Nebraska Senate in the 1874 fall election, running on the Republican Party ticket. He won the election and went on to represent the 6th Senate district, then comprising his home county, Burt, and neighboring Washington County. In 1875, the legislature moved toward another constitutional convention, which ultimately produced the Constitution of Nebraska later that year.

Although his settlement in Nebraska was informally referred to as "Lyons" for many years before, the village was officially named for him in 1880.

Waldo Lyon died at his home in Lyons on October 17, 1884.

== Personal life and family ==
Waldo Lyon was the seventh of ten children born to Josiah Lyon and his wife, Mary (née Cole). Waldo's elder brother, Durkee, followed him to Wisconsin, but remained there after Waldo's move to Nebraska.

Waldo Lyon married Lydia Hall in 1837, in Sullivan County, New Hampshire. They had three children together. Their eldest child, Waldo H. Lyon, served in the 1st Wisconsin Infantry Regiment through most of the American Civil War, and became his father's business partner in Lyons, Nebraska.

== Electoral history ==
=== Wisconsin constitutional convention (1847) ===
Wisconsin Constitutional Convention, Dodge County Delegate Election, 1847
Party	Candidate	Votes	%
Special Election, December 5, 1847 (vote for 3)
Democratic	Charles H. Larrabee	701	20.41%
Democratic	Samuel W. Lyman	679	19.77%
Democratic	Stoddard Judd	604	17.59%
Whig	Waldo Lyon	448	13.05%
Whig	S. S. Van Orden	424	12.35%
Whig	Lewis Mann	407	11.85%
Liberty	S. H. Taylor	59	1.72%
Liberty	J. A. Northrop	56	1.63%
Liberty	Nelson Gilbert	56	1.63%
Total votes		3,434	100.0%
Democratic win (new seat)			
Democratic win (new seat)			
Democratic win (new seat)			

=== Wisconsin Assembly (1858, 1859) ===
Wisconsin Assembly, Dodge County 3rd District Election, 1859
Party	Candidate	Votes	%
General Election, November 8, 1859
Republican	Jonathan W. Nash	317	50.96%
Independent Republican	Waldo Lyon (incumbent)	305	49.04%
Plurality		12	1.92%
Total votes		622	100.0%
Republican hold			

Wisconsin State Assembly
Preceded by Paul Juneau	Member of the Wisconsin State Assembly from the Dodge 3rd district January 3, 1859 – January 2, 1860	Succeeded by Jonathan W. Nash
