= Martin K. Dahl House =

Historic house in Wisconsin, United States

- U.S. National Register of Historic Places
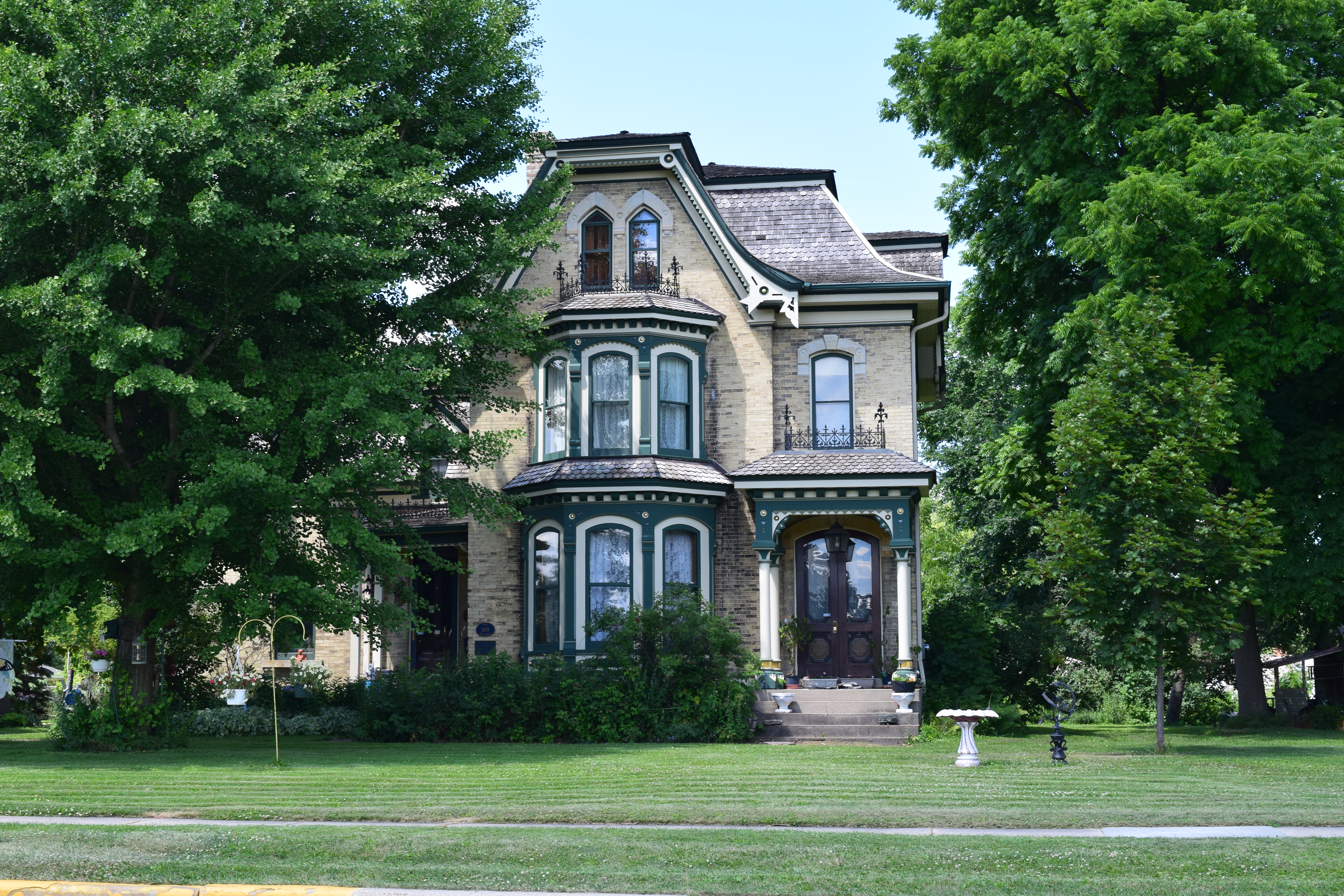
- Martin K. Dahl House
- Location: 314 Beaver Dam St., Waupun, Wisconsin
- Coordinates: 43°37′46″N 88°44′43″W
- Area: less than one acre
- Built: 1879
- Architect: Newell Whiting
- Architectural style: Second Empire
- NRHP reference No.: 75000062
- Added to NRHP: September 11, 1975

The Martin K. Dahl House is located in Waupun, Wisconsin.

== History ==
Martin K. Dahl was a Norwegian immigrant blacksmith and investor in farmlands in Minnesota and Dakota, a civic leader, and the builder of the "first mansion" in Waupun, this house. It was listed on the National Register of Historic Places in 1975 and on the State Register of Historic Places in 1989.
