= The Recording Angel =

- U.S. National Register of Historic Places
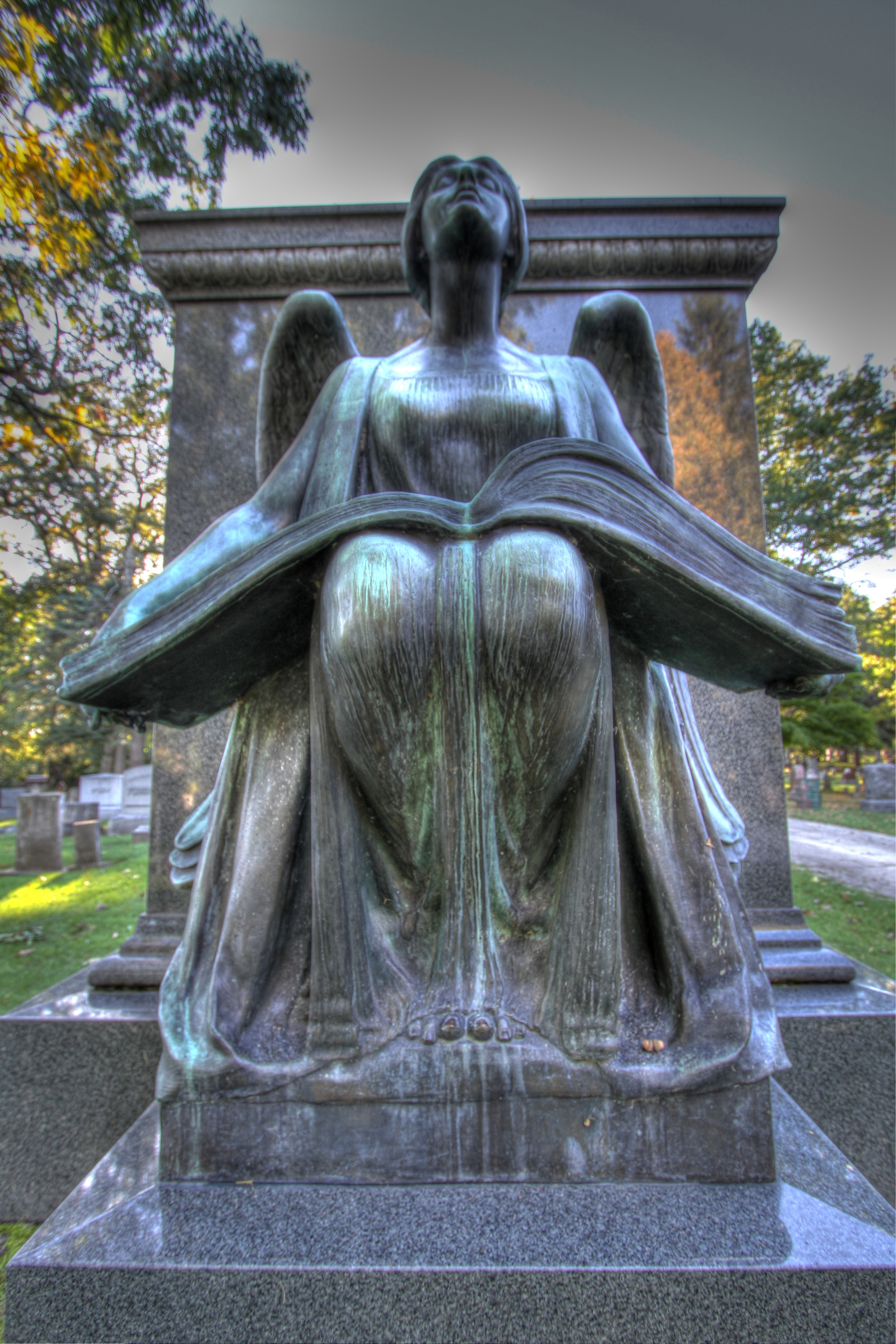
- Location: Forest Mound Cemetery; Waupun, Wisconsin
- NRHP reference No.: 74000088
- Added to NRHP: July 15, 1974

The Recording Angel is a sculpture located in Waupun, Wisconsin, United States. It was added to the National Register of Historic Places in 1974. A recording angel is assigned by God with the task of recording the events, actions, and prayers of each individual human.

== History ==
The angel was sculpted by Lorado Taft. He was commissioned to create the sculpture by his friend, Clarence Addison Shaler, in memory of his wife, Blanche.
