= Wisconsin's Dodge County 1st Assembly district =

Former American legislative district

Wisconsin's Dodge County 1st State Assembly district
- Obsolete
- Notes: 1848–1972

Wisconsin's Dodge County 1st Assembly district was a district in the Wisconsin State Assembly for most of the history of the state of Wisconsin, up to the legislative redistricting reforms of 1972 which created the current numbered districts. Located in central Wisconsin, the district was one of the 66 original Assembly districts defined in Article XIV of the Constitution of Wisconsin. The Constitution originally allocated five districts for Dodge County, Wisconsin; this district originally comprised the northwest quadrant of Dodge County.

The district was in use for the first 124 years of Wisconsin's history, from 1848 to 1972.

== List of representatives ==
List of representatives from the Dodge County 1st district
| Member | Party | Residence | Term start | Term end | Leg. |
|---|---|---|---|---|---|
District created
| Lorenzo Merrill | Dem. | Beaver Dam | June 5, 1848 | January 1, 1849 | 1st |
| Paul Juneau | Dem. | Theresa | January 1, 1849 | January 7, 1850 | 2nd |
| Oscar Hurlbut | Dem. | Lomira | January 7, 1850 | January 6, 1851 | 3rd |
| John Muzzy | Dem. | Mayville | January 6, 1851 | January 5, 1852 | 4th |
| Darius L. Bancroft | Whig | Waupun | January 5, 1852 | January 3, 1853 | 5th |
| Edward N. Foster | Whig | Mayville | January 3, 1853 | January 2, 1854 | 6th |
| Benjamin F. Barney | Dem. | Mayville | January 2, 1854 | January 1, 1855 | 7th |
| Narcisse Juneau | Dem. | Theresa | January 1, 1855 | January 7, 1856 | 8th |
| Benjamin F. Barney | Dem. | Williamstown | January 7, 1856 | January 5, 1857 | 9th |
| Edward N. Foster | Rep. | Mayville | January 5, 1857 | January 4, 1858 | 10th |
| John Steiner | Dem. | Woodland | January 4, 1858 | January 3, 1859 | 11th |
| Thomas Palmer | Dem. | Mayville | January 3, 1859 | January 2, 1860 | 12th |
| Elva Simpson | Dem. | Iron Ridge | January 2, 1860 | January 7, 1861 | 13th |
| Peter Peters | Dem. | Rubicon | January 7, 1861 | January 6, 1862 | 14th |
| Quartus H. Barron | Rep. | Fox Lake | January 6, 1862 | January 1, 1863 | 15th |
| Oliver Ashley | Rep. | Fox Lake | January 1, 1863 | January 4, 1864 | 16th |
| George H. Adams | Union | Danville | January 4, 1864 | January 2, 1865 | 17th |
| James M. McGuire | Union | Danville | January 2, 1865 | January 19, 1866 | 18th |
| --Vacant-- | | | January 19, 1866 | February 20, 1865 | 18th |
| Stoddard Judd | Union | Fox Lake | February 20, 1865 | January 1, 1866 | 18th |
| Oliver Ashley | Union | Westford | January 1, 1866 | January 7, 1867 | 19th |
| Miles Burnham | Union | Westford | January 7, 1867 | January 6, 1868 | 20th |
| Lawrence Connor | Dem. | Fox Lake | January 6, 1868 | January 4, 1869 | 21st |
| Cyrus Perry | Rep. | Waterloo | January 4, 1869 | January 3, 1870 | 22nd |
| E. Adams Fowler | Rep. | Calamus | January 3, 1870 | January 2, 1871 | 23rd |
| William E. Smith | Rep. | Fox Lake | January 2, 1871 | January 1, 1872 | 24th |
| Michael Adams | Rep. | Elba | January 1, 1872 | January 6, 1873 | 25th |
| John W. Davis | Dem. | Fox Lake | January 6, 1873 | January 5, 1874 | 26th |
| Edward J. Boomer | Rep. | Trenton | January 5, 1874 | January 4, 1875 | 27th |
| Owen R. Jones | Rep. | Beaver Dam | January 4, 1875 | January 3, 1876 | 28th |
| Patrick Griffin | Dem. | Portland | January 3, 1876 | January 1, 1877 | 29th |
| William Zeiman | Dem. | Horicon | January 1, 1877 | January 7, 1878 | 30th |
| Carl Dowe | Dem. | Horicon | January 7, 1878 | January 6, 1879 | 31st |
| William Fleming | Dem. | Emmet | January 6, 1879 | January 3, 1881 | 32nd 33rd |
| John Steele | Dem. | Ashippun | January 3, 1881 | January 2, 1882 | 34th |
| William Jeche | Dem. | Hustisford | January 2, 1882 | January 1, 1883 | 35th |
| Jacob Martin | Dem. | Beaver Dam | January 1, 1883 | January 5, 1885 | 36th |
| Felix Lynch | Dem. | Elba | January 5, 1885 | January 3, 1887 | 37th |
| Thomas F. Solon | Dem. | Shields | January 3, 1887 | January 5, 1891 | 38th 39th |
| Michael E. Burke | Dem. | Beaver Dam | January 5, 1891 | January 2, 1893 | 40th |
| Bennett E. Sampson | Dem. | LeRoy | January 2, 1893 | January 7, 1895 | 41st |
| Herman Rosenkranz | Dem. | Lomira | January 7, 1895 | January 4, 1897 | 42nd |
| Jesse Clason | Gold D. | Neosho | January 4, 1897 | January 2, 1899 | 43rd |
| John Kessler | Dem. | Watertown | January 2, 1899 | January 7, 1901 | 44th |
| Henry R. Moldenhauer | Dem. | Lebanon | January 7, 1901 | January 2, 1905 | 45th 46th |
| Frank S. Bauer | Dem. | LeRoy | January 2, 1905 | January 4, 1909 | 47th 48th |
| Charles Lentz | Dem. | Herman | January 4, 1909 | January 1, 1917 | 49th 50th 51st 52nd |
| Edmund J. Labuwi | Rep. | Neosho | January 1, 1917 | January 6, 1919 | 53rd |
| Jacob Scharpf | Rep. | Juneau | January 6, 1919 | January 3, 1921 | 54th |
| Herman A. Ziemer | Rep. | Emmet | January 3, 1921 | January 5, 1925 | 55th 56th |
| John M. Dihring | Rep. | Brownsville | January 5, 1925 | January 5, 1931 | 57th 58th 59th |
| Frank E. Panzer | Rep. | Oakfield | January 5, 1931 | January 2, 1933 | 60th |
| Lorenz Becker | Dem. | Woodland | January 2, 1933 | January 7, 1935 | 61st |
| Elmer L. Genzmer | Dem. | Mayville | January 7, 1935 | January 6, 1947 | 62nd 63rd 64th 65th 66th 67th |
| Elmer L. Genzmer | Rep. | Mayville | January 6, 1947 | January 7, 1963 | 68th 69th 70th 71st 72nd 73rd 74th 75th |
| Esther Doughty Luckhardt | Rep. | Horicon | January 7, 1963 | January 1, 1973 | 76th 77th 78th 79th 80th |
District abolished by 1971 Wisconsin Act 304; Dodge County was divided between the 53rd, 54th, 72nd, and 81st Assembly districts The Dodge County 1st district did not have a close analogue in the new map
