= David F. Simpson =

American judge

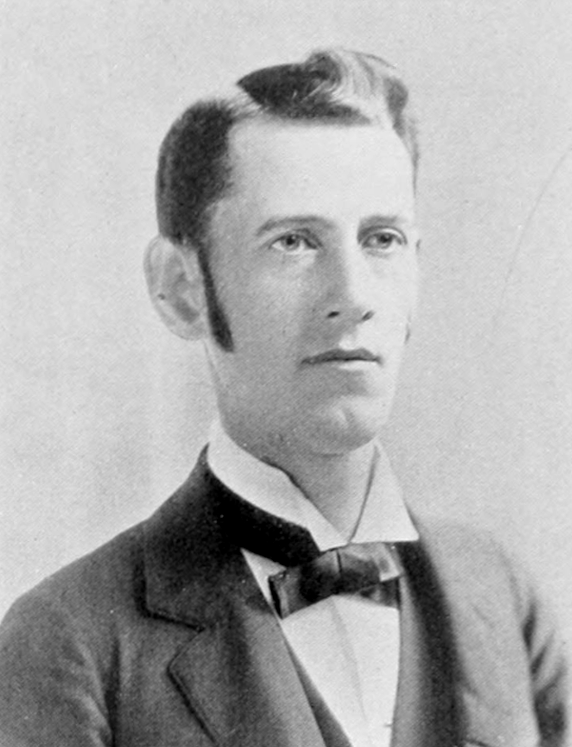
David Ferguson Simpson

David Ferguson Simpson (June 13, 1860 – October 11, 1925) was an American jurist and lawyer.

== Life ==
Born in Waupun, Wisconsin, Simpson went to Ripon College and then received his bachelor's degree from University of Wisconsin in 1882. In 1884, Simpson received his law degree from Columbia Law School and then practiced law in Minneapolis, Minnesota. He served as Minneapolis city attorney and then as Minnesota District Court judge from 1897 until 1911. Simpson served briefly on the Minnesota Supreme Court in 1911. Simpson then resumed his law practice in Minneapolis, Minnesota. Simpson died in Minneapolis on October 11, 1925, as a result of injuries sustained in a car accident three weeks earlier.
