= John Sharpstein =

American lawyer and judge (1823–1892)

The Honorable John R. Sharpstein
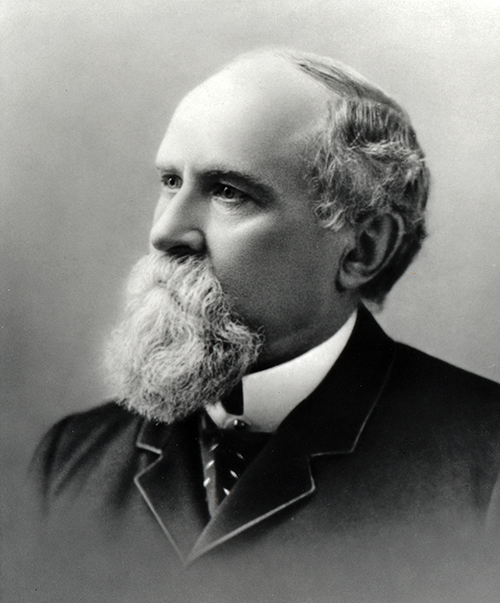

Associate Justice of the California Supreme Court
- In office January 5, 1880 – December 28, 1892
- Preceded by: Position Established
- Succeeded by: William F. Fitzgerald

United States Attorney for the District of Wisconsin
- In office 1853–1857
- President: Franklin Pierce
- Preceded by: George W. Lakin
- Succeeded by: Don A. J. Upham

Member of the Wisconsin Senate from the 8th district
- In office January 1, 1853 – January 1, 1854
- Preceded by: Thomas Bowen
- Succeeded by: Levi Grant

Member of the Wisconsin Senate from the 16th district
- In office January 1, 1852 – January 1, 1853
- Preceded by: Orson S. Head
- Succeeded by: Joel C. Squires

Member of the Wisconsin State Assembly from the Milwaukee 1st district
- In office January 1, 1863 – January 1, 1864
- Preceded by: Henry L. Palmer
- Succeeded by: Levi Hubbell

Personal details
- Born: John Randolph Sharpstein; May 3, 1823 Richmond, New York, U.S.
- Died: December 28, 1892 (aged 69) San Francisco, California, U.S.
- Spouse: Catherine C. Crittenden (m. 1845)
- Children: 4

John Randolph Sharpstein (May 3, 1823 – December 28, 1892) was an American lawyer and judge. He was an associate justice of the Supreme Court of California for twelve years, and previously served as a member of the Wisconsin State Senate and Wisconsin State Assembly.

== Biography ==
Sharpstein was born on May 3 or May 23, 1823 in Richmond, New York. In 1847, he moved to Sheboygan County, Wisconsin.

Sharpstein was a member of the Wisconsin State Senate from 1852 to 1853, representing the 16th district in 1852 and the 8th district in 1853. He was a member of the Wisconsin State Assembly in 1863.

Sharpstein was a District Attorney of Sheboygan County and of Kenosha County, Wisconsin. From 1853 to 1857, he was U.S. Attorney of Wisconsin. In 1854, he represented the government in the fugitive slave cases, Ableman v. Booth and United States v. Booth (18 How. 476, 21 How. 506), appealing up to the Supreme Court of the United States, where Chief Justice Roger Taney wrote the unanimous opinion. In April 1857, Sharpstein became Postmaster of Milwaukee, Wisconsin, and then was a delegate to the 1860 Democratic National Convention.

In 1864, Sharpstein moved to California, was admitted to the California bar in January 1865, and began practicing law there. In 1872, he published a book on insurance law. In January 1874, Governor Newton Booth appointed Sharpstein a judge of the Twelfth District Court in California, replacing Elisha W. McKinstry. In October 1875, he ran for election on the Republican ticket but lost the election to the district court to William E. Daingerfield.

In October 1879, when adoption of a new constitution required elections for all Supreme Court seats, Sharpstein was nominated by Democratic and Workingmen's Parties and won a position as associate justice. When the term began January 5, 1880, the justices drew lots to determine their length of term, and he and Erskine M. Ross both drew three-year terms. In November 1882, both Ross and Sharpstein were re-elected on the Democratic ticket to 12-year terms. Among Sharpstein's notable opinions is Tape v. Hurley, 66 Cal. 473 (1885), holding the City of San Francisco excluding a Chinese child from public school violated the California Constitution. In July 1886, former Chief Justice David S. Terry filed a petition which unsuccessfully sought the removal of both Chief Justice Robert F. Morrison and Sharpstein on the basis of incompetence due to age.

Sharpstein remained a member of the court until his death on December 28, 1892.

== Civic activities ==
In 1878, Sharpstein was a member of the first board of trustees of the Hastings College of the Law.

== Personal life ==
On November 17, 1845, Sharpstein married Catherine C. Crittenden in Macomb, Michigan. They had two daughters, who both died young in Michigan, and two sons, Jay Pitt Sharpstein, who lived in Berkeley, and William Crittenden Sharpstein, who graduated from Hastings College of Law and became an attorney.

== Selected publications ==
- Sharpstein, John R. (1872). A Digest of American, English, Scotch and Irish Reports of Life and Accident Insurance Cases. San Francisco, CA: Sumner Whitney & Co.

== See also ==
- List of justices of the Supreme Court of California

Legal offices
Preceded by Elections under new constitution of 1879	Associate Justice of the California Supreme Court; 1880–1892	Succeeded by William F. Fitzgerald
