= Fred E. Moul =

American politician (1878–1955)

Fred Ernest Moul (June 5, 1878 – August 23, 1955) was a member of the Wisconsin State Assembly.

Moul was born in Burnett, Wisconsin on June 5, 1878. Moul was elected to the Assembly in 1920, 1922, 1924 and 1928. In addition, he was town chairman (similar to mayor) and town treasurer of Burnett, Wisconsin. He was a Republican. He died at Waupun Memorial Hospital on August 23, 1955.
