= Denoon, Wisconsin =

Former settlement in Waukesha and Racine counties, Wisconsin

Denoon, Wisconsin Denoon, Wisconsin
- Ghost town
- Location within Wisconsin
- Coordinates: 42°50′36″N 88°09′44″W
- Country: United States
- State: Wisconsin

Denoon (also called DeNoon or De Noon) was a village established by James DeNoon Reymert in 1852, straddling the county line between Waukesha and Racine counties in Wisconsin, 15 miles southeast of Waukesha, in range 20 E. of the towns of Muskego and Norway, on the shore of Lake Denoon. It was on the plank road between Milwaukee and Rochester, which Reymert is generally credited with getting built.

In a gazetteer published in 1853, it was described as having a population of about 100, including dwellings, a store, a hotel, a Lutheran church, and "several mechanical shops". It was depopulated as the result of a cholera epidemic in the 1850s.
