= Thomas Bowen (Wisconsin politician) =

19th century American politician

Member of the Wisconsin Senate
- In office January 3, 1853 – January 2, 1854
- Preceded by: District established
- Succeeded by: Francis H. West
- Constituency: 24th district
- In office January 5, 1852 – January 3, 1853
- Preceded by: William Rittenhouse
- Succeeded by: John Sharpstein
- Constituency: 8th district

Personal details
- Born: May 1, 1808 Bennington County, Vermont, U.S.
- Died: October 20, 1883 (aged 75) Clarno, Wisconsin, U.S.
- Resting place: Bowen Family Homestead Cemetery, Clarno, Wisconsin
- Party: Democratic
- Spouses: Louisa Grannis (m. 1829; died 1854); Margaret Gibler (m. 1862–1883)
- Children: with Louisa Grannis; Anna Olive (Howe)^{(b. 1828; died 1912)}; Avis West (McElhiney)^{(b. 1830; died 1917)}; Celestia Armida (Staver)^{(b. 1836; died 1902)}; John William Bowen^{(b. 1840)}; Phebe Statisa (Sigworth)^{(b. 1842; died 1890)}; Farmer Joseph Bowen^{(b. 1844; died 1870)}; Remember (Thorp)^{(b. 1847; died 1921)}; Smith Cameron Bowen^{(b. 1848; died 1937)}; Daniel Davy Bowen^{(b. 1853; died 1926)}; with Margaret Gibler; Louisa (Gray)^{(b. 1863; died 1944)}; Thomas Smith Bowen Jr.^{(b. 1867)}

Thomas Smith Bowen (May 1, 1808 – October 20, 1883) was an American farmer, Democratic politician, and Wisconsin pioneer. He was a member of the Wisconsin Senate, representing Green County during the 1852 and 1853 sessions.

== Biography ==
Thomas Smith Bowen was born in Bennington County, Vermont, on May 1, 1808. He was raised and educated in New England, moving west to the Wisconsin Territory in 1836. He settled on a farm in the town of Clarno, Wisconsin, in what is now Green County, where he resided for much of the rest of his life. At the time, there were only about six houses in the township and no roads.

Smith was recalled in an anecdote from the pioneer years of the Wisconsin Territory, during the difficult Winter of 1842–1843. Corn was scarce and cattle were dying of starvation. Smith, who had a supply of corn from his farm, vocally resisted plans to hike prices or hoard, and was remembered for his honesty.

After Wisconsin became a state, he was elected to the county board of supervisors when Green County was established in 1849, and served through the end of 1851. That year, he was elected to the Wisconsin Senate, running on the Democratic Party ticket. His district comprised all of Green County, which constituted the 8th Senate district during the 5th Wisconsin Legislature (1852), then—after a redistricting act was passed in that session—it became the 24th Senate district in 1853. He took a leave of absence from the legislature and missed most of the 1853 session after his wife fell ill. She died in April 1854.

He returned to the county board in 1856, 1860, and 1861. The Democratic Party dropped in popularity after the start of the American Civil War. Bowen ran for State Senate again in 1863, but was defeated by Walter S. Wescott. He then ran for county coroner in 1865, but lost again. He fell ill in 1866 and moved to the village of Monroe, Wisconsin, leaving his farm in the hands of his sons. After 12 years in Monroe, he returned to his farm in Clarno, where he died on October 20, 1883.

== Personal life and family ==
Thomas Bowen married twice. His first wife was Louisa Grannis; they married in 1829 and had nine children before her death in 1854. One child died young. Bowen eventually married again, in 1862, with Margaret Gibler of Stephenson County, Illinois. He had two more children with his second wife, who survived him.

He was buried on the farm property, in what's now known as the Bowen Family Homestead Cemetery. Bowen's descendants still own and operate the farm.

Wisconsin Senate
Preceded by William Rittenhouse	Member of the Wisconsin Senate from the 8th district January 5, 1852 – January 3, 1853	Succeeded by John Sharpstein
District created by 1852 Wis. Act 499	Member of the Wisconsin Senate from the 24th district January 3, 1853 – January 2, 1854	Succeeded by Francis H. West
