= Waupun Carnegie Library (Waupun Heritage Museum) =

- Waupun Heritage Museum (Waupun Carnegie Library)
- U.S. National Register of Historic Places
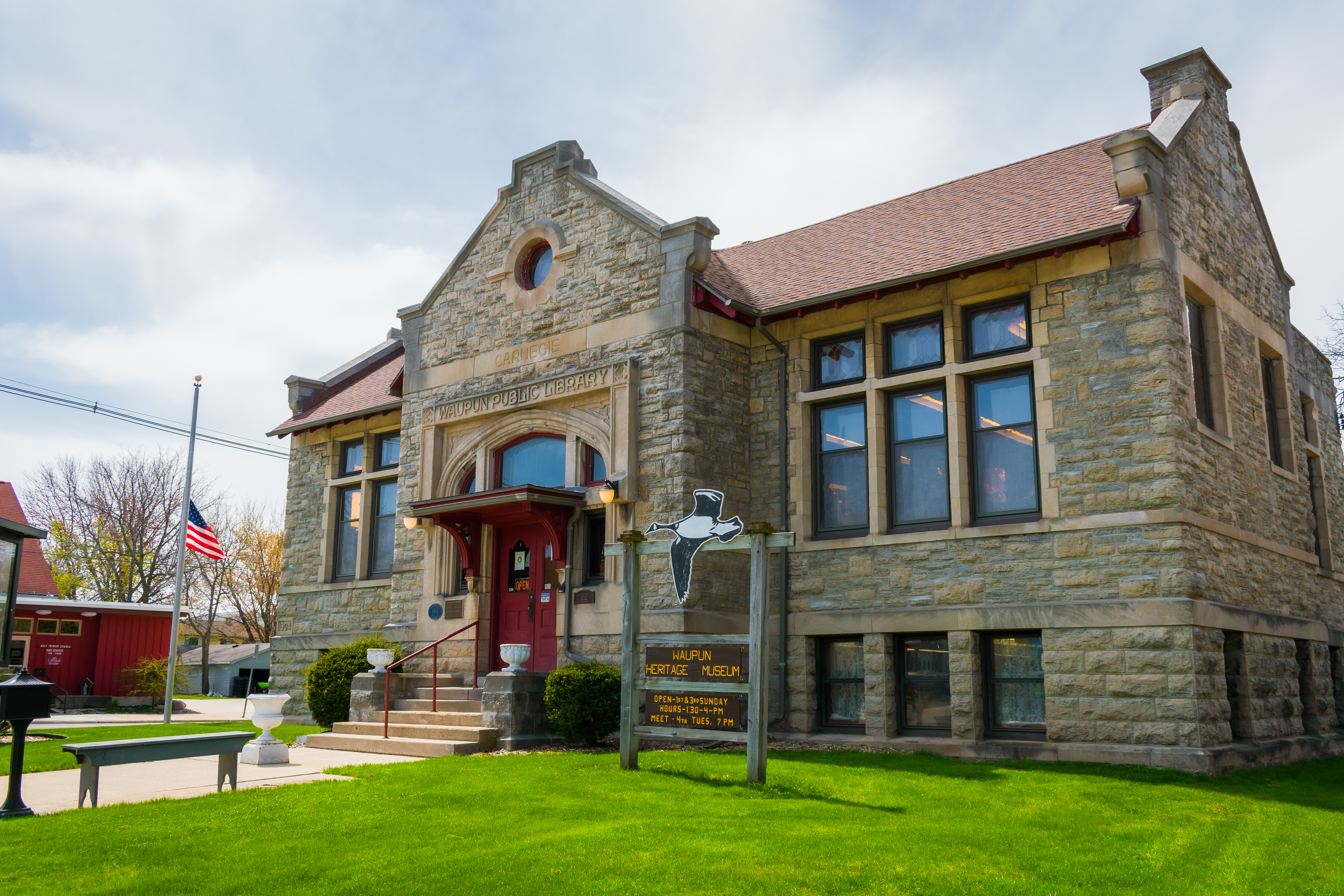
- Waupun Heritage Museum
- Location: 22 S. Madison St., Waupun, Wisconsin
- Coordinates: 43°37′57″N 88°43′48″W
- Area: 0.2 acres (0.081 ha)
- Built: 1904
- Architect: H. A. Foeller
- Architectural style: Gothic Revival
- NRHP reference No.: 79000072
- Added to NRHP: September 4, 1979

The Waupun Carnegie Library building is in Waupun, Wisconsin and currently serves as the Waupun Heritage Museum.

== History ==
A Carnegie library, the building began construction October 11, 1904 and was completed a year later on October 22, 1905. It served in its original function as the library until 1968 when a new library was completed. It was leased to the Waupun Historical Society in 1971.

The building was listed on the National Register of Historic Places in 1979 and on the State Register of Historic Places in 1989.
