= Henry Spiering =

American politician

Henry Spiering (June 7, 1831 – June 16, 1908) was an American editor and politician.

Born in Brandenberg, Prussia, Spiering emigrated with his parents to the United States in 1846 and went to Milwaukee, Wisconsin Territory. In 1849, Spiering settled in Mayville, Wisconsin. Spiering was a printer and editor of the newspapers Horicon Volksfreund and the Horicon News. He served as chairman of the Williamstown Town Board and as the Williamstown town treasurer. He was also clerk and president of the village of Mayville. In 1879, 1883 and 1887, he served in the Wisconsin State Assembly and was a Democrat. Spiering died in Mayville after a short illness.
