= Orville W. Mosher =

American politician

Orville Watson Mosher
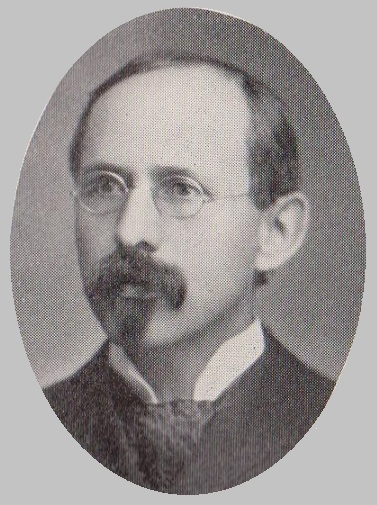

Member of the Wisconsin Senate from the 10th district
- In office 1901–1905
- Succeeded by: James A. Frear

Wisconsin State Assembly
- In office 1899–1901

Personal details
- Born: November 8, 1853 Waupun, Wisconsin
- Died: October 6, 1933 (aged 79)
- Party: Republican
- Spouse: Delia H. Mosher (1845 - 1923)

Orville Watson Mosher (November 8, 1853 – October 6, 1933) was a member of the Wisconsin State Assembly and the Wisconsin State Senate.

== Biography ==
Mosher was born on November 8, 1853, near Waupun, Wisconsin. He graduated from Ripon College in 1879. He was the principal of the New Richmond High School from 1879 to 1883. After 1883 he engaged in milling and dealing in grain and farm produce. He was the president of the New Richmond School board for nine years. He was elected as a trustee for the St. Croix County Asylum for the Insane when it opened in 1896, and was reelected to that position several times.

He died on October 6, 1933, and is buried in New Richmond Cemetery, in New Richmond. He was married to Delia H. Mosher (née Tobie, 1845–1923).

== Career ==
Mosher was a member of the Assembly from 1899 to 1901 and of the Senate from 1901 to 1907. He was a Republican.
