= Henry E. Krueger =

American politician

Henry E. Krueger (May 14, 1882 – November 30, 1960) was a member of the Wisconsin State Assembly.

== Biography ==
Krueger was born on May 14, 1882, in Beaver Dam, Wisconsin. He graduated from the University of Wisconsin in 1907. On October 3, 1911, he married Martha Fisher. He died at a Beaver Dam hospital on November 30, 1960.

== Career ==
Krueger was a member of the Assembly during the 1911, 1913, 1933, 1935 and 1937 sessions. In addition, he was chairman (similar to mayor), clerk, and assessor of Beaver Dam. He was a Democrat.
