= Samuel R. Webster =

American politician (1854–1948)

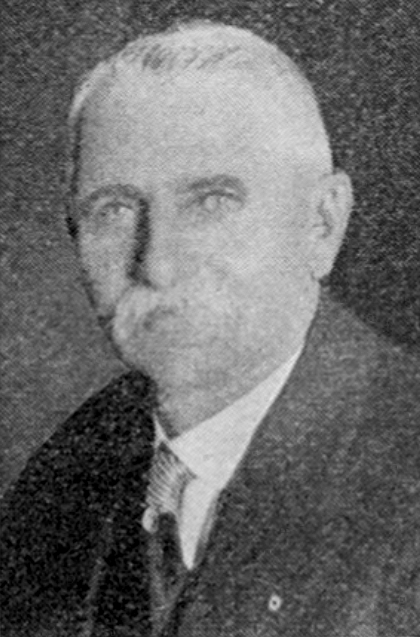

Member of the Wisconsin State Assembly
- In office 1897, 1917, 1919

Personal details
- Born: Samuel Robert Webster; July 7, 1854 Elba, Wisconsin, US
- Died: March 12, 1948 (aged 93) Columbus, Wisconsin, US
- Party: Republican
- Spouse: Harriet Chamberlin (m. 1879; died 1939)
- Education: Ripon College

Samuel Robert Webster (July 7, 1854 – March 12, 1948) was a member of the Wisconsin State Assembly.

== Biography ==
Webster was born on the Webster farm in Elba, Wisconsin, east of Columbus. He attended high school in Danville, Wisconsin and Columbus before attending Ripon College and the Milwaukee Business College. Webster's son, Harold, became County Surveyor of Milwaukee County, Wisconsin. The elder Webster and his family were Congregationalists. Webster married Harriet Chamberlin (1854–1939) in 1879. Webster died in Columbus on March 12, 1948.

== Career ==
Webster was elected to the Assembly in 1896, 1916 and 1918. He was a Republican.
