= David Vittum =

American politician (1820–1880)

David Sands Vittum (October 30, 1820 – April 10, 1880) was an American soldier, lawyer, politician, and businessman.

Born in Sandwich, New Hampshire, Vittum graduated from Dartmouth College in 1845. He then studied law and practiced in Meredith, New Hampshire. Vittum then moved to Baraboo, Wisconsin, in 1851, and continued to practice law. He served in the Wisconsin State Senate in 1853 and 1854 as a Democrat. He also edited the Sauk County Democrat. During the Civil War, Vittum served in the 3rd Wisconsin Volunteer Cavalry Regiment, Company F, as a captain and then lieutenant colonel. After the war, he returned to Baraboo and was president of a bank (the First National Bank of Baraboo for seven years. He also was involved in a woolen company. He died in Baraboo, Wisconsin.

David Sands Vittum was a companion member of the Military Order of the Loyal Legion of the United States. He became the first of the "Vittum Folk" to graduate college when he graduated Dartmouth College in 1845. He was a descendant of William and Jeane Vittum (aka "Vittom" and likely "Vieuxtemps" in French), who immigrated from France to Hampton, New Hampshire, in the late 17th century. William (or "Guilliame") was a French Huguenot, and having married Jeane, a Catholic, felt compelled to flee France after the revocation of the Edict of Nantes.
