= Darius L. Bancroft =

American politician (born 1819)

Darius L. Bancroft (born February 15, 1819) was an American politician. He was a member of the Wisconsin State Assembly.

== Biography ==
Bancroft was born on February 15, 1819, in New Berlin, New York. On September 3, 1843, he married Sarah Merriam. They would have nine children. Bancroft settled in Chester, Wisconsin, in 1845.

== Career ==
Bancroft was a member of the Assembly during the Sessions of 1852 and 1874. Additionally, he was Superintendent of Schools, Town Clerk and Chairman of the Town Board of Chester. Originally a Whig, he later became a Republican.
