= Williamstown, Wisconsin =

- Town
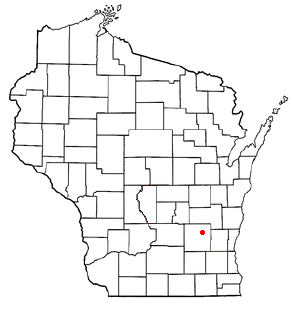
- Location of Williamstown, Wisconsin
- Coordinates: 43°30′2″N 88°34′10″W
- Country: United States
- State: Wisconsin
- County: Dodge

Area
  - Total: 33.6 sq mi (86.9 km^{2})
  - Land: 32.9 sq mi (85.2 km^{2})
  - Water: 0.66 sq mi (1.7 km^{2})
- Elevation: 873 ft (266 m)

Population (2000)
  - Total: 646
  - Density: 20/sq mi (7.6/km^{2})
- Time zone: UTC-6 (Central (CST))
  - Summer (DST): UTC-5 (CDT)
- FIPS code: 55-87225
- GNIS feature ID: 1584440
- Website: http://williamstown-wi.com/

Williamstown was a town in Dodge County, Wisconsin, United States. The population was 646 at the 2000 census. In 2018, the Town of Williamstown incorporated and became the Village of Kekoskee.

== Geography ==
According to the United States Census Bureau, the town had a total area of 33.6 square miles (86.9 km^{2}), of which 32.9 square miles (85.2 km^{2}) was land and 0.7 square mile (1.8 km^{2}) (2.03%) was water.

== Demographics ==
At the 2000 census there were 646 people, 235 households, and 195 families living in the town. The population density was 19.6 people per square mile (7.6/km^{2}). There were 242 housing units at an average density of 7.4 per square mile (2.8/km^{2}). The racial makeup of the town was 98.61% White, 0.15% African American, 0.15% Native American, 0.31% Asian, 0.15% from other races, and 0.62% from two or more races. Hispanic or Latino of any race were 1.08%.

Of the 235 households 32.3% had children under the age of 18 living with them, 74.5% were married couples living together, 3.8% had a female householder with no husband present, and 17.0% were non-families. 13.6% of households were one person and 4.7% were one person aged 65 or older. The average household size was 2.75 and the average family size was 3.03.

The age distribution was 23.5% under the age of 18, 7.6% from 18 to 24, 28.6% from 25 to 44, 28.6% from 45 to 64, and 11.6% 65 or older. The median age was 40 years. For every 100 females, there were 107.1 males. For every 100 females age 18 and over, there were 112.9 males.

The median household income was $62,969 and the median family income was $69,688. Males had a median income of $41,313 versus $26,875 for females. The per capita income for the town was $25,167. About 2.1% of families and 1.9% of the population were below the poverty line, including none of those under age 18 and 2.6% of those age 65 or over.
