= Waupun, Wisconsin =

- City
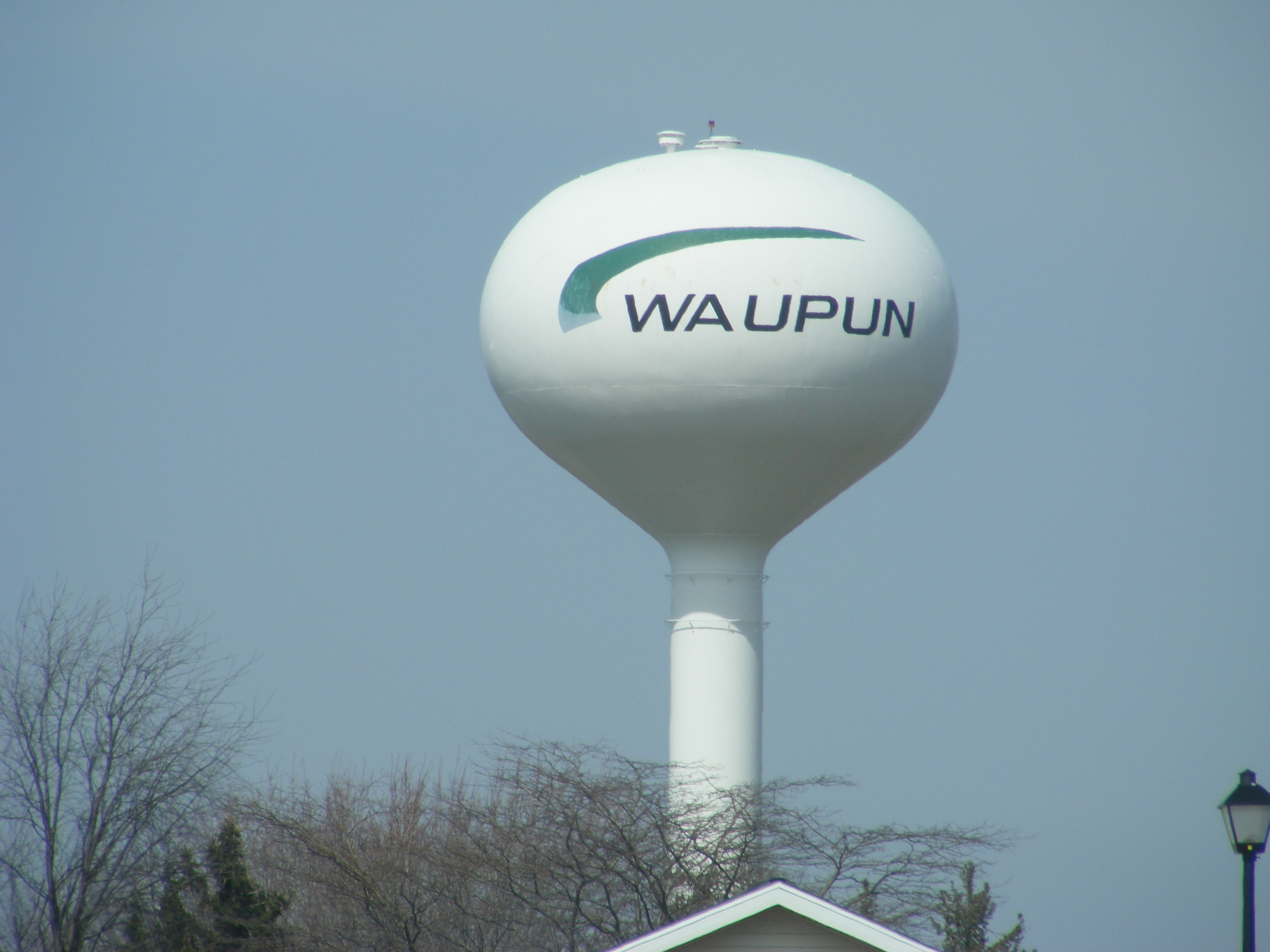
- Waupun water tower
- Nicknames: City of Sculptures, Prison City
- Location of Waupun in Dodge County and Fond du Lac County, Wisconsin.

- Location within Wisconsin Location within the United States
- Coordinates: 43°37′54″N 88°44′9″W
- Country: United States
- State: Wisconsin
- County: Dodge, Fond du Lac

Area
  - Total: 4.68 sq mi (12.12 km^{2})
  - Land: 4.62 sq mi (11.97 km^{2})
  - Water: 0.062 sq mi (0.16 km^{2})
- Elevation: 892 ft (272 m)

Population (2020)
  - Total: 11,344
  - Density: 2,460/sq mi (948/km^{2})
- Time zone: UTC-6 (Central (CST))
  - Summer (DST): UTC-5 (CDT)
- ZIP code: 53963
- Area code: 920
- FIPS code: 55-84425
- GNIS feature ID: 1576324
- Website: www.cityofwaupunwi.gov

Waupun is a city in Dodge and Fond du Lac counties in the U.S. state of Wisconsin. The population was 11,344 at the 2020 census. Of this, 7,795 were in Dodge County, and 3,549 were in Fond du Lac County. In Fond du Lac County, the Town of Waupun abuts the city of Waupun.

== History ==
=== Founding ===
Waupun was founded in 1839 by Seymour Wilcox, the first settler along the Rock River in what was then deciduous forested land. Wilcox chose the land on recommendation of John Bannister, the first surveyor of Fond du Lac County, who reported to the government office in Green Bay that "the Rock River Valley was the most beautiful and fertile he had ever seen." Wilcox surveyed the land himself in late fall of 1838, returning to Green Bay for the winter. In February 1839 he returned to the plot he laid out accompanied by two men, John N. Ackerman and Hiram Walker, who were interested in the powerful river and fertile land. They quickly nailed together a shanty to four bur oaks and began building a suitable cabin for the Wilcox homestead. Leaving Ackerman and Walker to finish, Wilcox returned to Green Bay to bring his family to their new home. They reached Waupun on March 20, 1839.

Waupun comes from the Ojibwe word "Waubun" which means "the east," "the morning," "the twilight of dawn" and "dawn of day." Waupun was originally supposed to be named "Waubun" but the state of Wisconsin made a spelling error, and Waupun never bothered to change it. An adjacent town with the same name was changed along with the village.

=== Early history ===
The first town election took place in 1842 at the Wilcox home; eleven votes were cast. When the village charter was ratified 15 years later, 323 votes were cast in the first election. Because of the steady growth of the village, a city charter was granted on March 15, 1878. John N. Ackerman was elected as the first city mayor.

In 1851, the city was chosen for the State Penitentiary, owing to the abundance of limestone for construction. The main building, constructed in 1854, is still in use.

The Milwaukee & Horicon Railroad reached Waupun in 1856. It was sold to the Milwaukee & St. Paul Railway June 23, 1863. This company eventually became the Chicago, Milwaukee, St. Paul and Pacific Railroad, known as "The Milwaukee Road", which served Waupun until 1980, when the line was sold to the state of Wisconsin and became the Wisconsin & Southern Railroad.

The Waupun Library Association was established in 1858 through the efforts of William Euen and Edwin Hillyer. Hillyer ran the library out of his insurance office for 37 years without pay. In 1895, the city took ownership of the library, appointing a new library board which included Edwin Hillyer and Lucius D. Hinkley. When the city took ownership, it was soon moved to a side room in the Whiting Theater, which became the Davison Theater while still housing the library. In 1900, through the fundraising efforts of the Waupun Women's Club, it became a free public library. The Waupun Carnegie Library, now Waupun Heritage Museum, was built in 1904 with a $10,000 grant from Andrew Carnegie. A new library building was built in 1968 and is the current Waupun Public Library.

The territorial census in 1847 showed the Town of Waupun to have a population of 956. The 1875 Wisconsin census showed the village of Waupun to have a population of 1,867.

=== Second World War ===
In 1945 Waupun, was selected for the site of a German POW camp. Despite public opposition, the camp was constructed next to the canning factory, south of Doty Street. The prisoners were brought to Wisconsin to relieve deficits of manpower in the area factories and farms. There were about 200 POWs at the Waupun camp who were assigned to work either for Canned Foods Inc. in Waupun or Stokely Foods in Brandon, Wisconsin.

== Geography ==
Waupun is located at 43°37′54″N 88°44′9″W (43.631577, −88.735835).

According to the United States Census Bureau, the city has a total area of 4.68 square miles (12.12 km^{2}), of which 4.62 square miles (11.97 km^{2}) is land and 0.06 square miles (0.16 km^{2}) is water.

The relief of the city is moderate, ranging from 870 feet (270 m) at the Rock River, to its highest elevation of 941 feet (287 m) above sea level.

Waupun lies near the edge of the Horicon Marsh, the largest cattail marsh in the United States, and is the principal access point to wildlife viewing for the Horicon Wildlife Refuges.

The Fond du Lac County Park, on the edge of Waupun, has preserved a remnant stand of old-growth southern mesic forest, which once covered over 3 million acres (12,000 km^{2}) of Southern Wisconsin. The Fond du Lac County Park also provides camping.

== Demographics ==
Historical population
Census	Pop.	Note	%±
1860	1,736		—
1870	1,935		11.5%
1880	2,353		21.6%
1890	2,757		17.2%
1900	3,185		15.5%
1910	3,362		5.6%
1920	4,440		32.1%
1930	5,768		29.9%
1940	6,798		17.9%
1950	6,725		−1.1%
1960	7,935		18.0%
1970	7,946		0.1%
1980	8,132		2.3%
1990	8,207		0.9%
2000	10,718		30.6%
2010	11,340		5.8%
2020	11,344		0.0%
U.S. Decennial Census

=== 2020 census ===
As of the 2020 census, Waupun had a population of 11,344. The median age was 37.9 years. 17.4% of residents were under the age of 18 and 14.2% of residents were 65 years of age or older. For every 100 females there were 164.1 males, and for every 100 females age 18 and over there were 182.1 males age 18 and over.

The population density was 2,455.4 inhabitants per square mile (948.0/km^{2}). There were 3,863 housing units at an average density of 836.1 per square mile (322.8/km^{2}). 99.6% of residents lived in urban areas, while 0.4% lived in rural areas. The 2020 census population of the city included 2,867 people incarcerated in adult correctional facilities.

There were 3,647 households in Waupun, of which 28.8% had children under the age of 18 living in them. Of all households, 45.5% were married-couple households, 19.5% were households with a male householder and no spouse or partner present, and 26.2% were households with a female householder and no spouse or partner present. About 32.1% of all households were made up of individuals and 14.1% had someone living alone who was 65 years of age or older.

Of the housing units, 5.6% were vacant. The homeowner vacancy rate was 2.1% and the rental vacancy rate was 6.9%.

Racial composition as of the 2020 census
Race	Number	Percent
White	9,150	80.7%
Black or African American	1,451	12.8%
American Indian and Alaska Native	163	1.4%
Asian	64	0.6%
Native Hawaiian and Other Pacific Islander	2	0.0%
Some other race	142	1.3%
Two or more races	372	3.3%
Hispanic or Latino (of any race)	547	4.8%

=== Demographic estimates ===
According to the American Community Survey estimates for 2016–2020, the median income for a household in the city was $55,621, and the median income for a family was $67,078. Male full-time workers had a median income of $44,250 versus $38,947 for female workers. The per capita income for the city was $26,763. About 5.3% of families and 7.7% of the population were below the poverty line, including 7.1% of those under age 18 and 7.8% of those age 65 or over. Of the population age 25 and over, 84.7% were high school graduates or higher and 16.3% had a bachelor's degree or higher.

=== 2010 census ===
As of the census of 2010, there were 11,340 people, 3,485 households, and 2,259 families living in the city. The population density was 2,583.1 inhabitants per square mile (997.3/km^{2}). There were 3,703 housing units at an average density of 843.5 per square mile (325.7/km^{2}). The racial makeup of the city was 84.7% White, 12.2% African American, 1.2% Native American, 0.3% Asian, 0.2% Pacific Islander, 0.5% from other races, and 0.9% from two or more races. Hispanic or Latino of any race were 1.9% of the population.

There were 3,485 households, of which 30.8% had children under the age of 18 living with them, 50.1% were married couples living together, 9.2% had a female householder with no husband present, 5.5% had a male householder with no wife present, and 35.2% were non-families. 30.4% of all households were made up of individuals, and 13.1% had someone living alone who was 65 years of age or older. The average household size was 2.35 and the average family size was 2.91.

The median age in the city was 36.4 years. 17.6% of residents were under the age of 18; 11% were between the ages of 18 and 24; 35.1% were from 25 to 44; 23.4% were from 45 to 64; and 12.9% were 65 years of age or older. The gender makeup of the city was 61.0% male and 39.0% female.

=== 2000 census ===
As of the census of 2000, there were 10,718 people, 3,351 households, and 2,228 families living in the city. The population density was 2,906.3 people per square mile (1,121.5/km^{2}). There were 3,512 housing units at an average density of 952.3 per square mile (367.5/km^{2}). The racial makeup of the city was 86.06% White, 11.81% African American, 0.91% Native American, 0.26% Asian, 0.05% Pacific Islander, 0.51% from other races, and 0.40% from two or more races. Hispanic or Latino of any race were 2.84% of the population.

There were 3,351 households, out of which 32.2% had children under the age of 18 living with them, 54.1% were married couples living together, 9.3% had a female householder with no husband present, and 33.5% were non-families. 29.6% of all households were made up of individuals, and 15.0% had someone living alone who was 65 years of age or older. The average household size was 2.38 and the average family size was 2.96.

In the city, the population was spread out, with 19.9% under the age of 18, 11.6% from 18 to 24, 36.1% from 25 to 44, 18.9% from 45 to 64, and 13.4% who were 65 years of age or older. The median age was 35 years. For every 100 females, there were 150.0 males. For every 100 females age 18 and over, there were 161.2 males.

The median in the city was $40,597, and the median income for a family was $50,820. Males had a median income of $34,795 versus $23,517 for females. The per capita income for the city was $16,947. About 4.4% of families and 5.5% of the population were below the poverty line, including 5.3% of those under age 18 and 8.3% of those age 65 or over.

(Note: The above statistics may not accurately reflect the civilian population, as the census includes 2,741 incarcerated males (2008) in Waupun's state correctional institutions.)

== Transportation ==
The U.S. 151 expressway bypasses Waupun and has four exits into the city, with its former routing in the city signed as Business Highway 151. WI 26, WI 49, and Wisconsin 68 run through the city, along with county highways AW, I, M, and MMM. The city is also served by the Wisconsin and Southern Railroad.

== Government ==
Waupun is governed by a common council with a mayor and six alderman elected from districts. The Mayor of Waupun is Rohn W. Bishop.

About a quarter of the town's population is incarcerated at the Dodge Correctional Institution, John C. Burke Correctional Center, and Waupun Correctional Institution. These more than 3,000 people from around the state may not vote but make up a majority in two districts. This prison gerrymandering gives outsized electoral power to other residents in the districts relative to others.

== Education ==
Waupun is served by the Waupun Area School District. The school district includes several schools including SAGES, Meadow View Primary, Rock River Intermediate and Waupun High School. SAGES (School for Agriculture and Environmental Studies) is located in Fox Lake. Meadow View Primary, Rock River Intermediate and Waupun High School are all in Waupun. A private school, Central Wisconsin Christian High School, is also located in the city.

== Economy ==
Alto Dairy Cooperative, a farmer-owned dairy cooperative in Waupun was sold to Saputo Inc. in 2008.

National Rivet, a rivet manufacturer, has been based in Waupun for more than 90 years, along with its predecessor and subsidiary, the Shaler Company.

== Culture ==
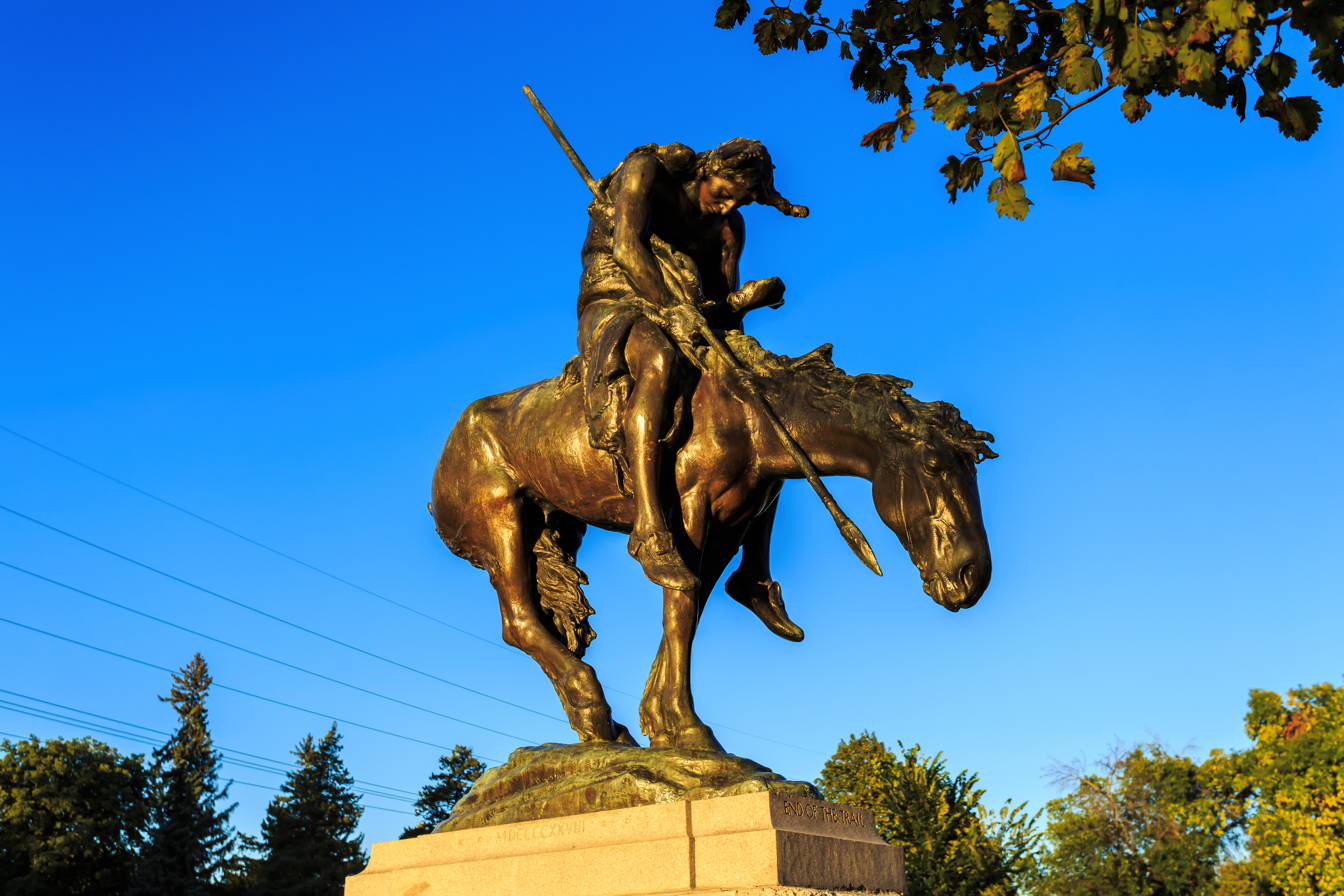
End of the Trail statue

=== City of Sculpture ===
Waupun is home to a collection of outdoor sculptures by Clarence Addison Shaler, a manufacturer, inventor, and sculptor from the local area. These sculptures include The Dawn of Day, Who Sows Believes in God, The Pioneers, and The Recording Angel, among others.

A bronze copy of James Earle Fraser's well-known End of the Trail statue stands in Shaler Park. Shaler commissioned the copy in 1926. Depicting a Native American slumped on a horse, it represents the fate of the Native American people. It was dedicated in the park on June 23, 1929.

== Images ==
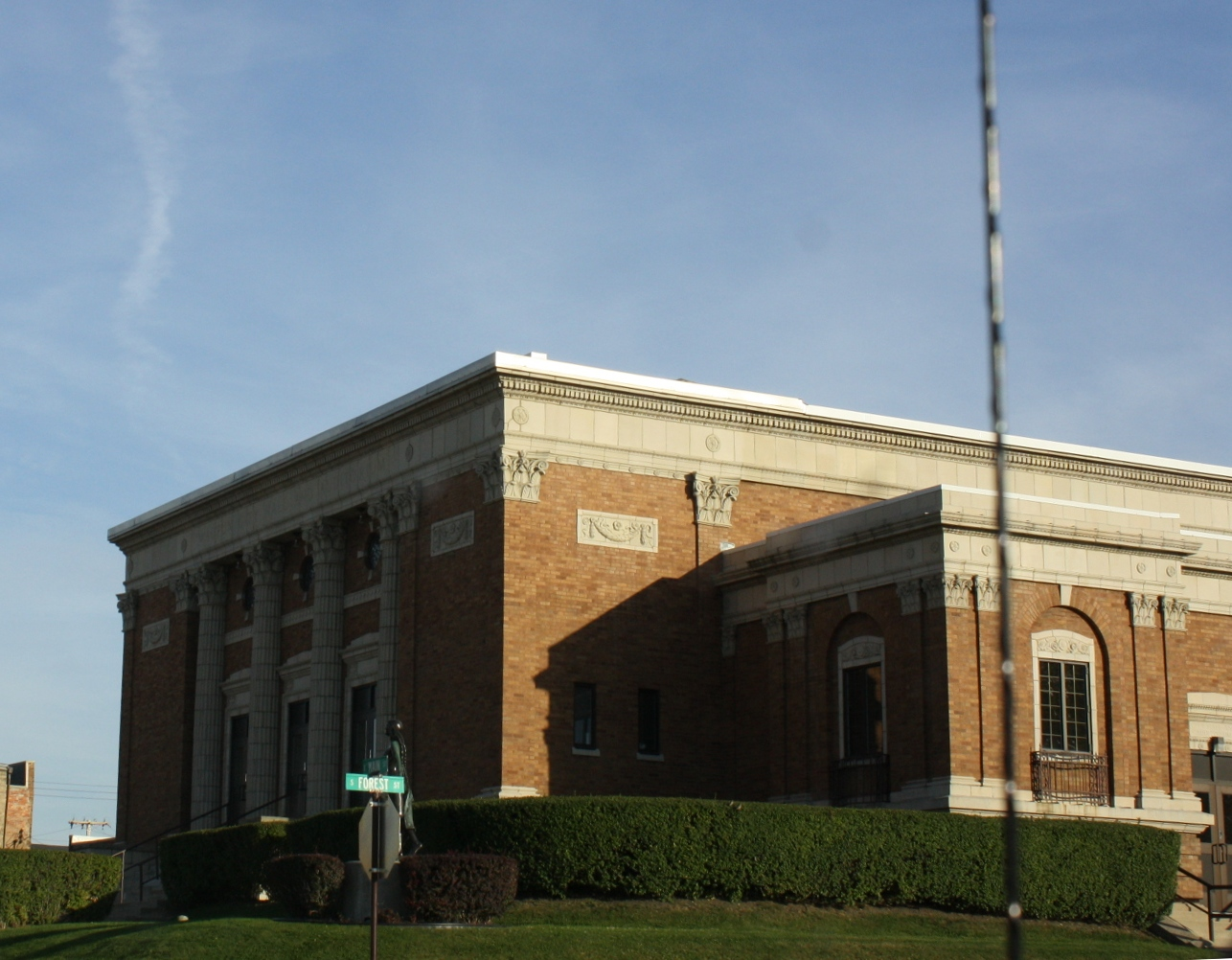
City Hall, constructed in 1928.

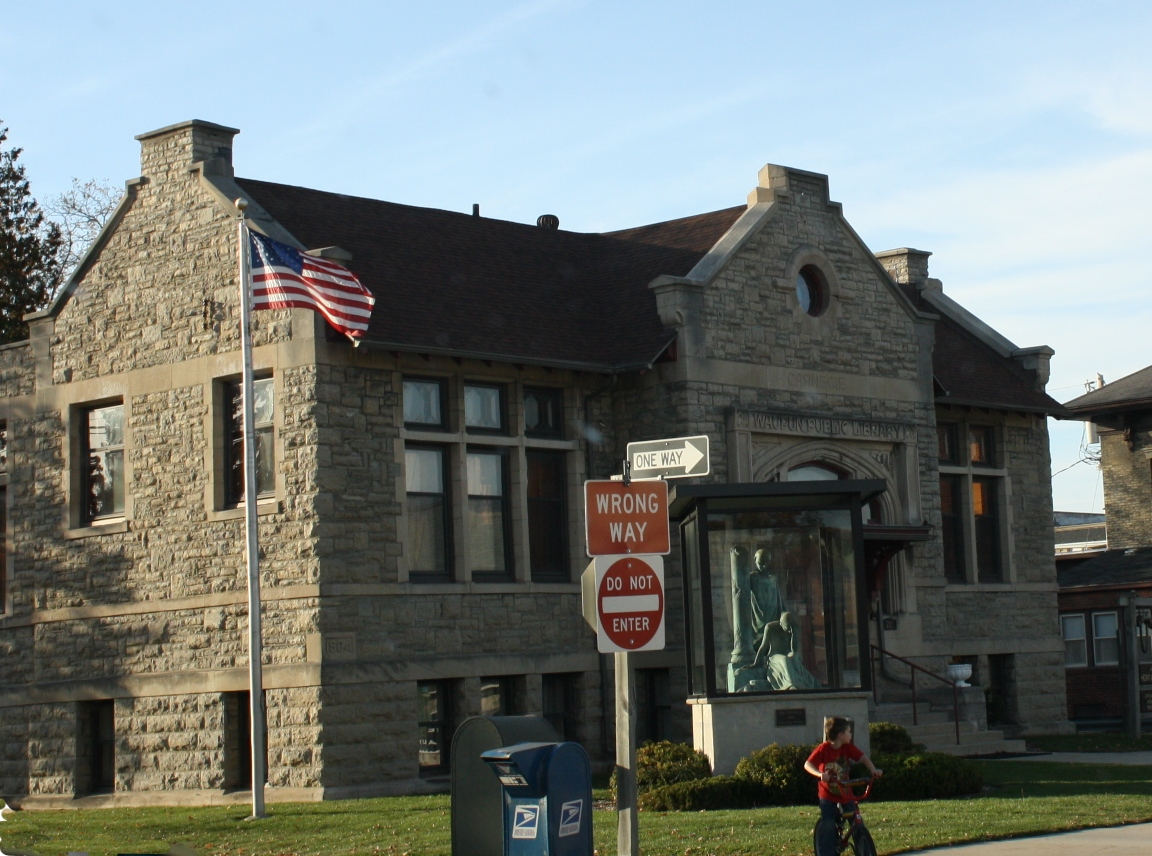
Former Waupun Public Library, now a museum, registered historic place.

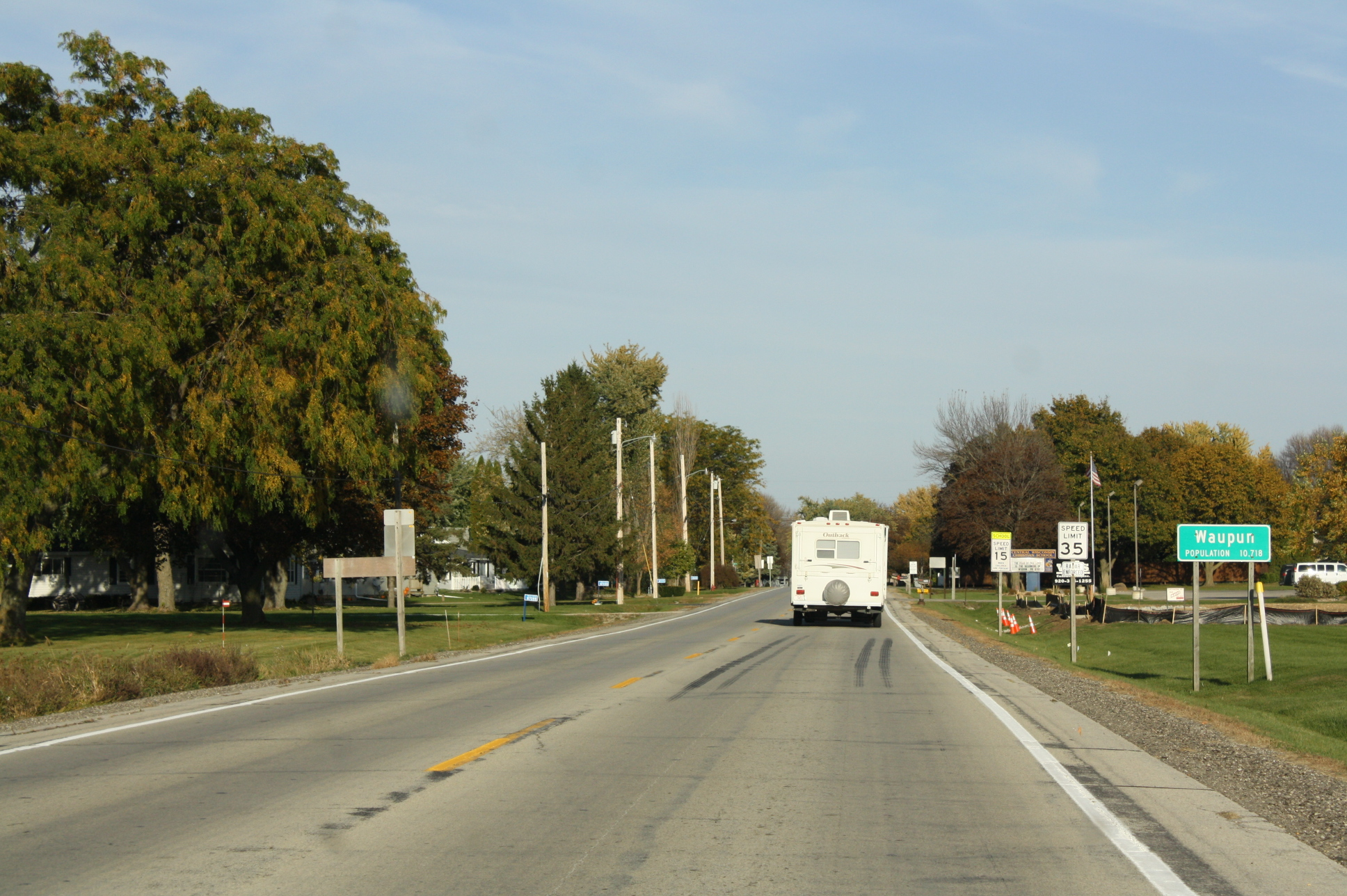
Waupun sign on WIS 68.

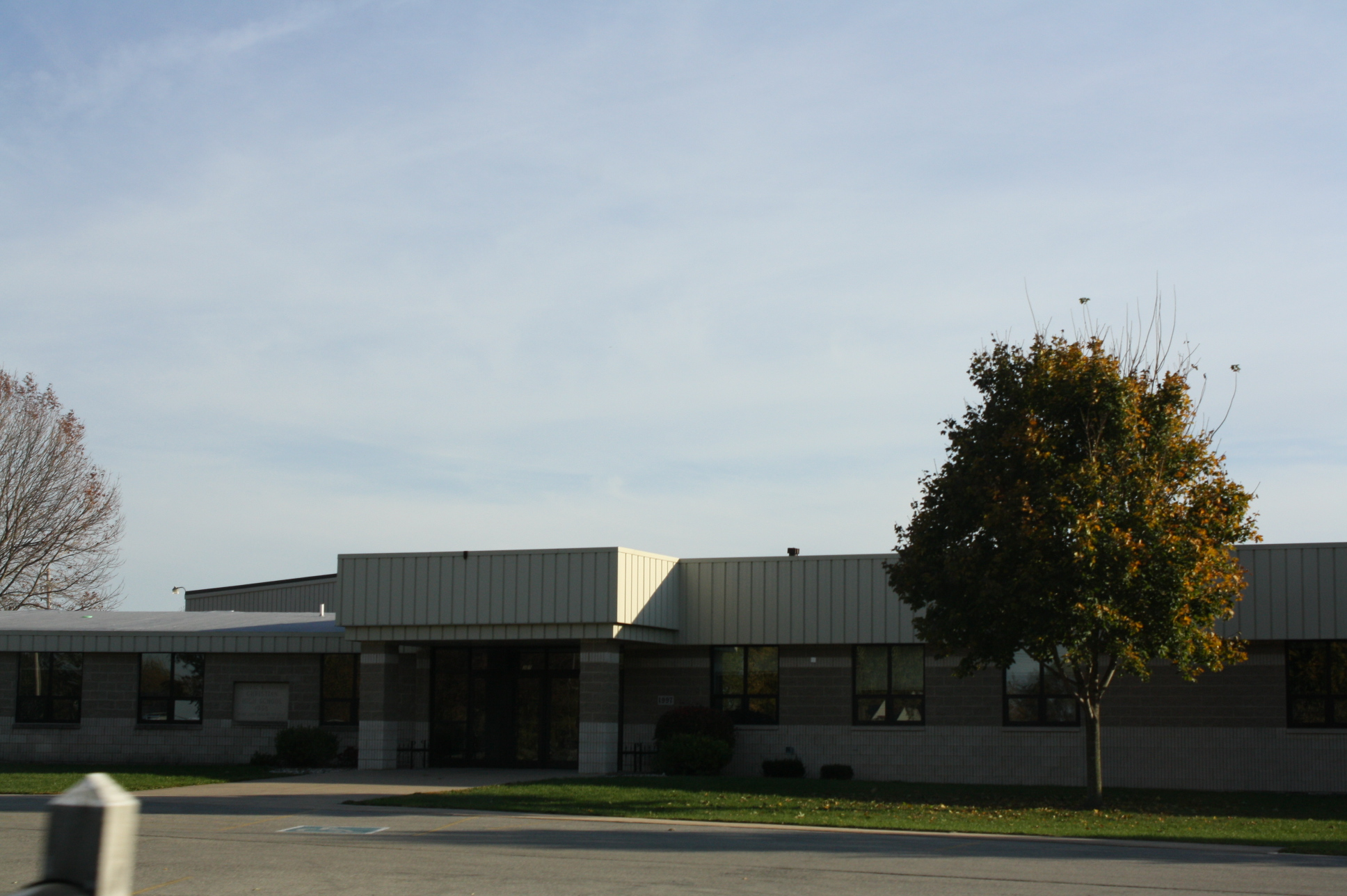
Central Wisconsin Christian School.

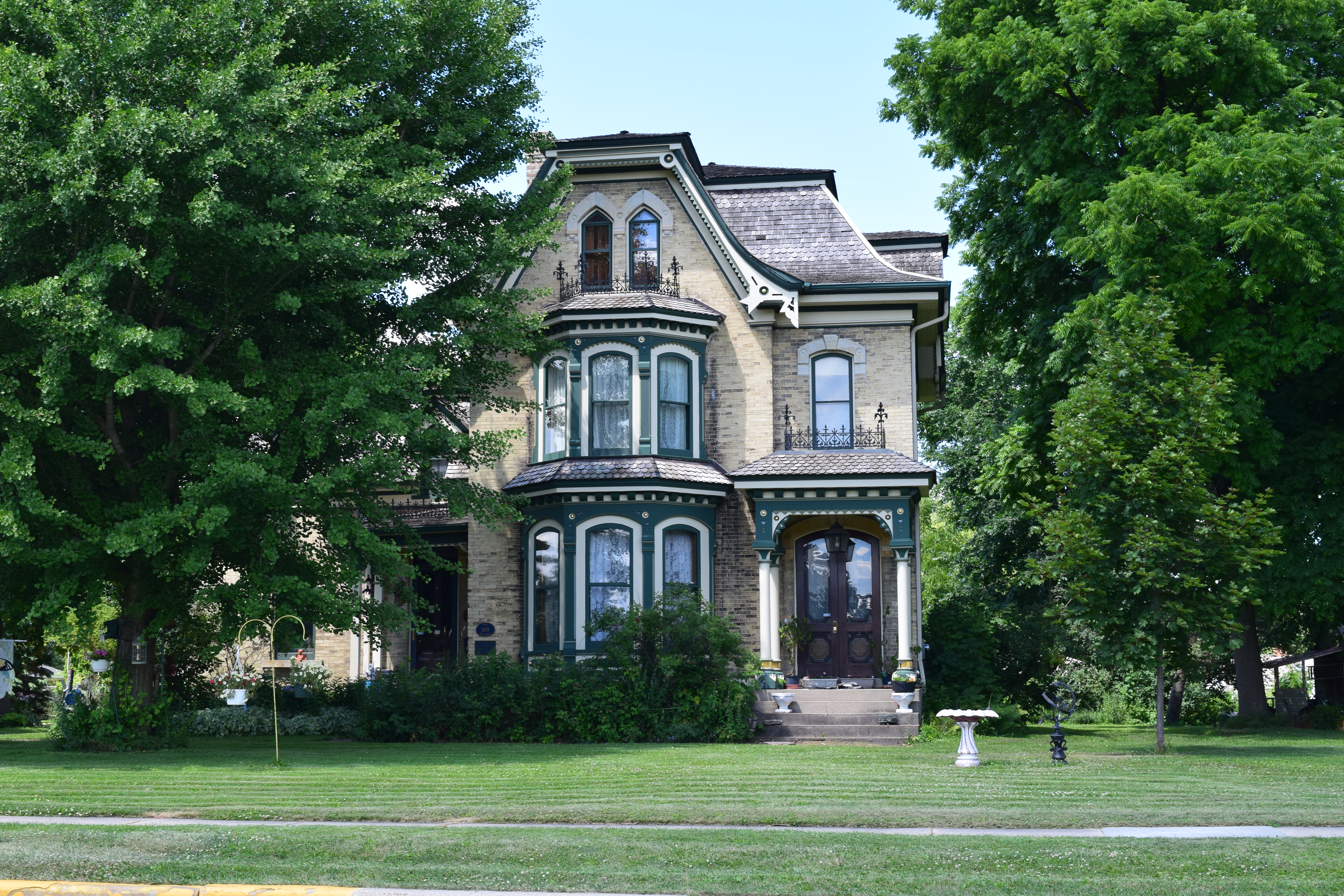
Martin K. Dahl House.

== Notable people ==
- Frank L. Bacon, Wisconsin State Representative
- Thomas Bowen, Wisconsin State Senator
- Henry Waldo Coe, frontier physician and politician
- Harriet L. Cramer, newspaper publisher
- Glenn Robert Davis, U.S. Representative
- Fond du Lac County Jane Doe, unidentified murder victim interred at the Cattaraugus Cemetery, eventually identified as Amy Yeary
- Marcus Domask, basketball player
- Yasmin Farooq, 1996 Olympian (rowing cox)
- Joe Hauser, baseball player
- Hans Christian Heg, highest ranking Wisconsin soldier to die in the American Civil War
- Edwin Hillyer, Wisconsin State Representative
- Fred H. Hildebrandt, U.S. Representative from South Dakota
- Cornelia Loomis Hull, founded Waupun Council on Human Relations
- Emory Richard Johnson, economist
- Orville W. Mosher, Wisconsin State Senator
- Tom Mullica, magician and comedian
- Magdalen Redman, All-American Girls Professional Baseball League player
- David F. Simpson, Minnesota Supreme Court justice
- Oliver Smith, stage designer
- John van Hengel, Food Bank founder
- Harriet Ware, pianist and composer
- Ferdinand T. Yahr, Wisconsin State Senator
- Chauncey W. Yockey, Wisconsin State Representative
