= Allen Hiram Atwater =

American politician (1817–1889)

Allen Hiram Atwater (1817 – 1889) was an American politician who was a member of the Wisconsin State Assembly.

== Biography ==
Atwater was born in Riga, New York, in 1817. He moved to Wisconsin in 1840. Two years later returned to New York, where he married Eliza A. Parmelee. They would have nine children. He returned to Wisconsin and served in town, county and state legislatures. He moved to Dakota Territory in 1883.

== Career ==
Atwater was a member of the Assembly during the 1854, 1871 and 1872 sessions. In 1856 and 1858, he was elected County Treasurer of Dodge County, Wisconsin. Other positions Atwater held include justice of the peace. Initially a Whig, he later became a Republican.
