= Wisconsin's 5th Senate district =

American legislative district in Milwaukee County and Waukesha County, Wisconsin

Wisconsin's 5th State Senate district
- 2024 map defined in 2023 Wisc. Act 94; 2022 map defined in Johnson v. Wisconsin Elections Commission; 2011 map was defined in 2011 Wisc. Act 43 composed of Assembly districts 13, 14, and 15
Senator
Rob Hutton; R–Brookfield
since January 3, 2023 (3 years, 308 days)
- Demographics: 81.72% White; 4.57% Black; 6.1% Hispanic; 5.81% Asian; 1.59% Native American; 0.1% Hawaiian/Pacific Islander
- Population (2020) • Voting age: 178,761; 140,958
- Website: Official website
- Notes: Milwaukee metro area (west)

The 5th Senate district of Wisconsin is one of 33 districts in the Wisconsin Senate. Located in southeast Wisconsin, the district is composed of parts of western Milwaukee County, and eastern Waukesha County. It includes the cities of Brookfield and Pewaukee, and the villages of Elm Grove and Pewaukee, as well as most of the cities of Wauwatosa and West Allis, and parts of the cities of Milwaukee and Waukesha.

== Current elected officials ==
Rob Hutton is the senator representing the 5th district since January 2023. He previously served eight years in the Wisconsin State Assembly, representing the 13th Assembly district from 2013 to 2021.

Each Wisconsin State Senate district is composed of three State Assembly districts. The 5th Senate district comprises the 13th, 14th, and 15th Assembly districts. The current representatives of those districts are:

- Assembly District 13: Robyn Vining (D–Wauwatosa)
- Assembly District 14: Angelito Tenorio (D–West Allis)
- Assembly District 15: Adam Neylon (R– Pewaukee)

The district is located mostly within Wisconsin's 5th congressional district, which is represented by U.S. Representative Scott L. Fitzgerald. The parts of the district in Wauwatosa, Milwaukee, and some of the West Allis precincts are within Wisconsin's 4th congressional district, represented by Gwen Moore.

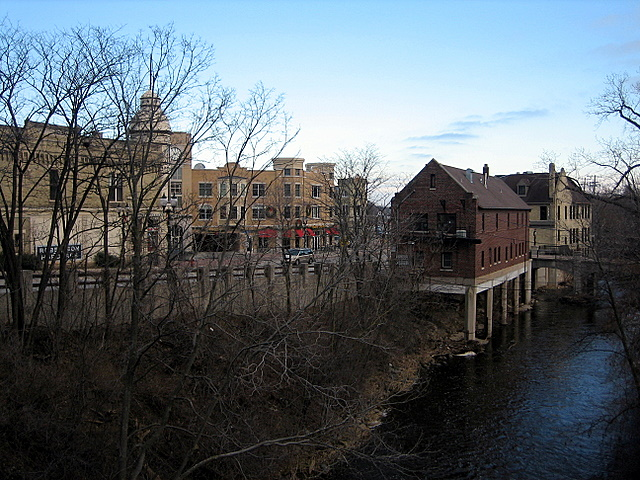
Wauwatosa, Wisconsin

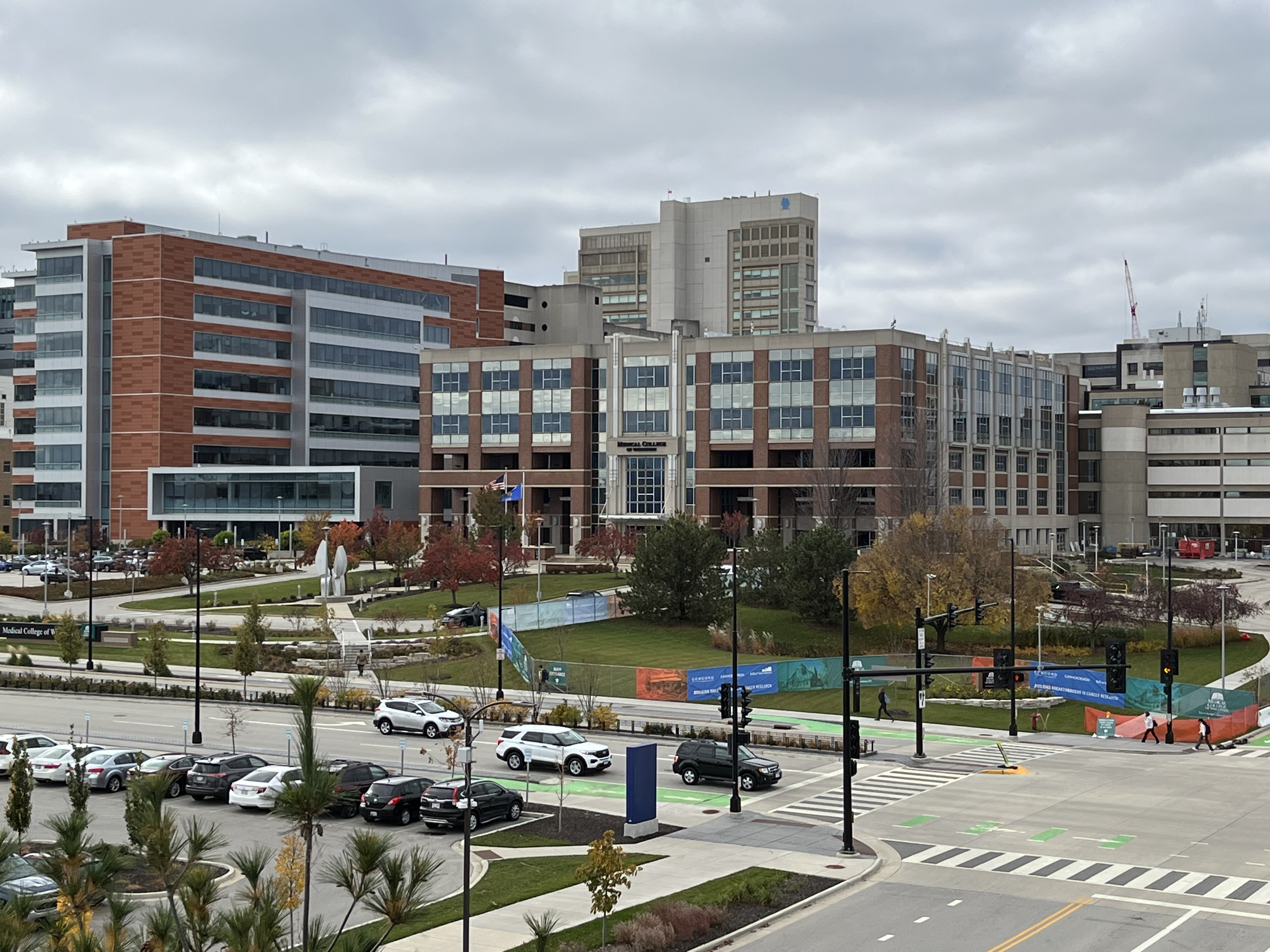
Medical College of Wisconsin

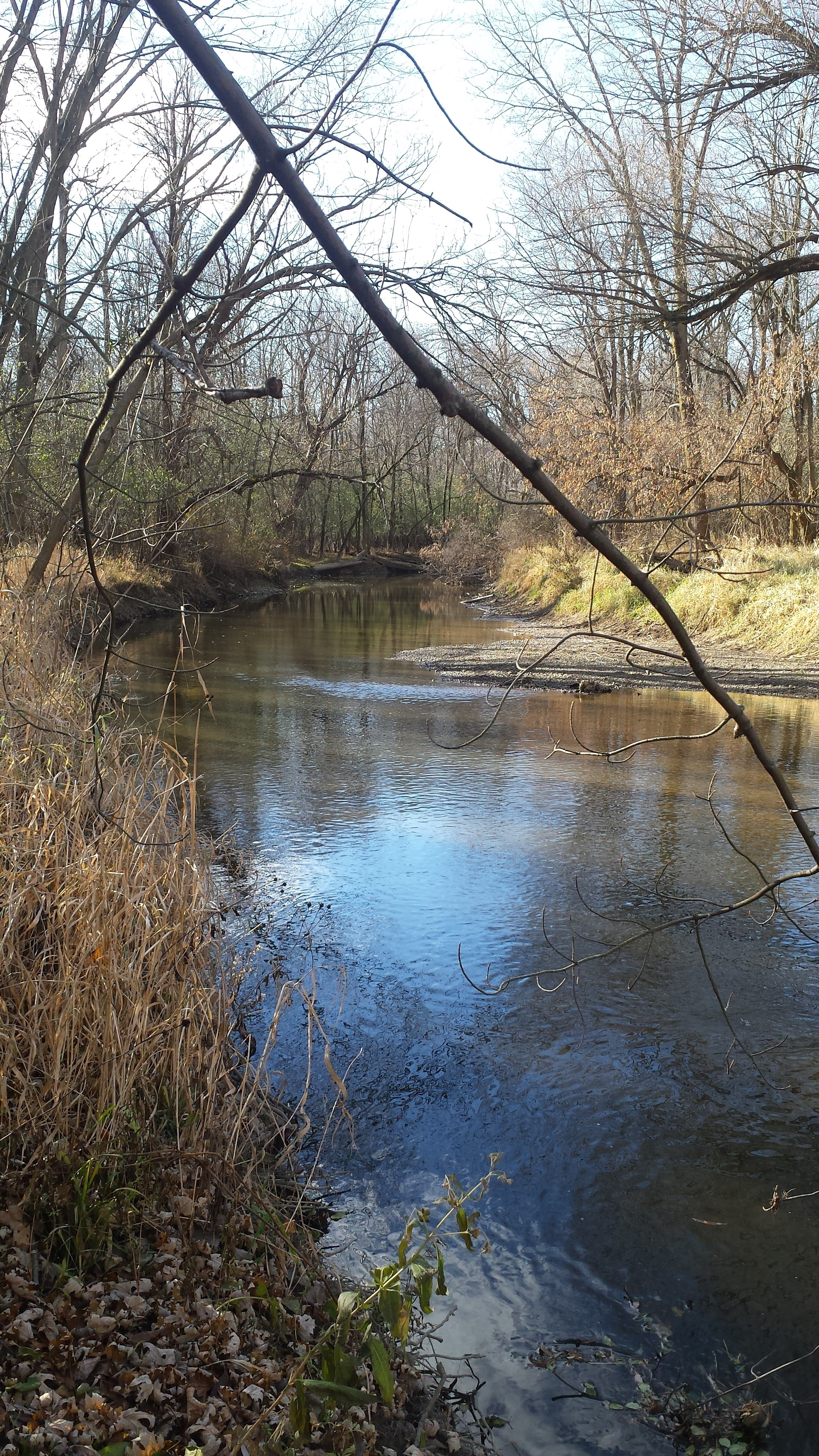
Menomonee River at Webster Park

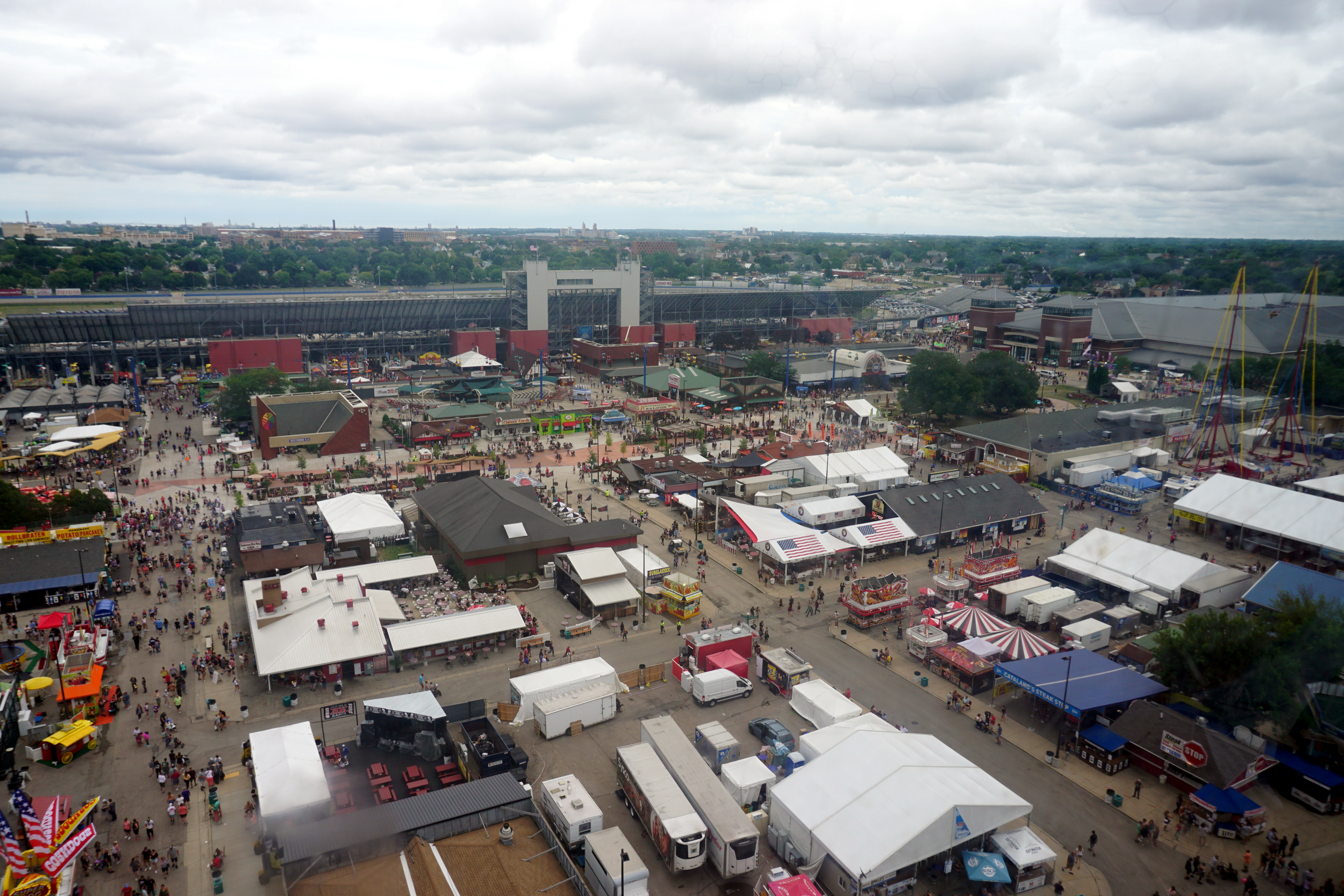
Wisconsin State Fair Park

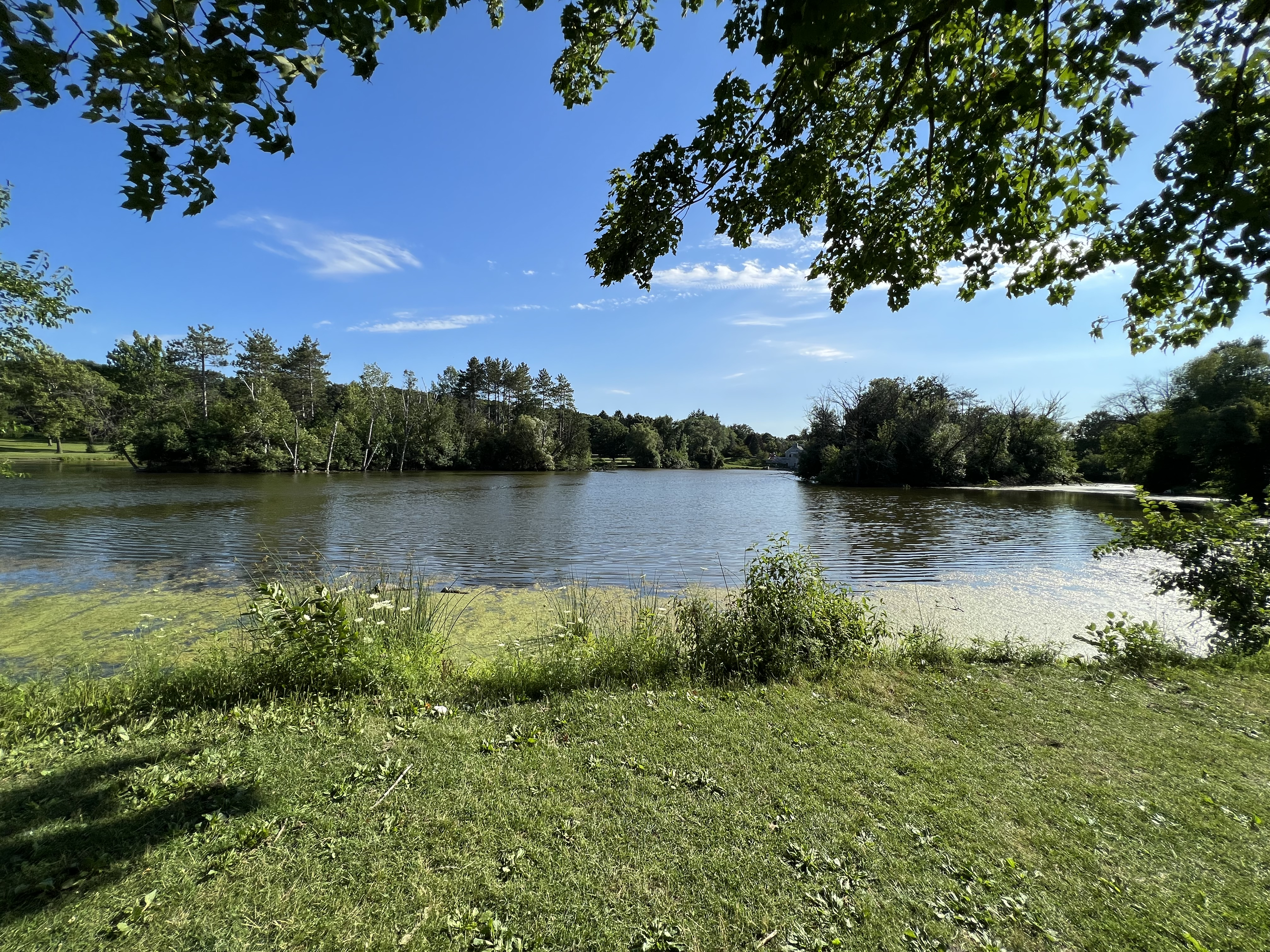
Greenfield Park

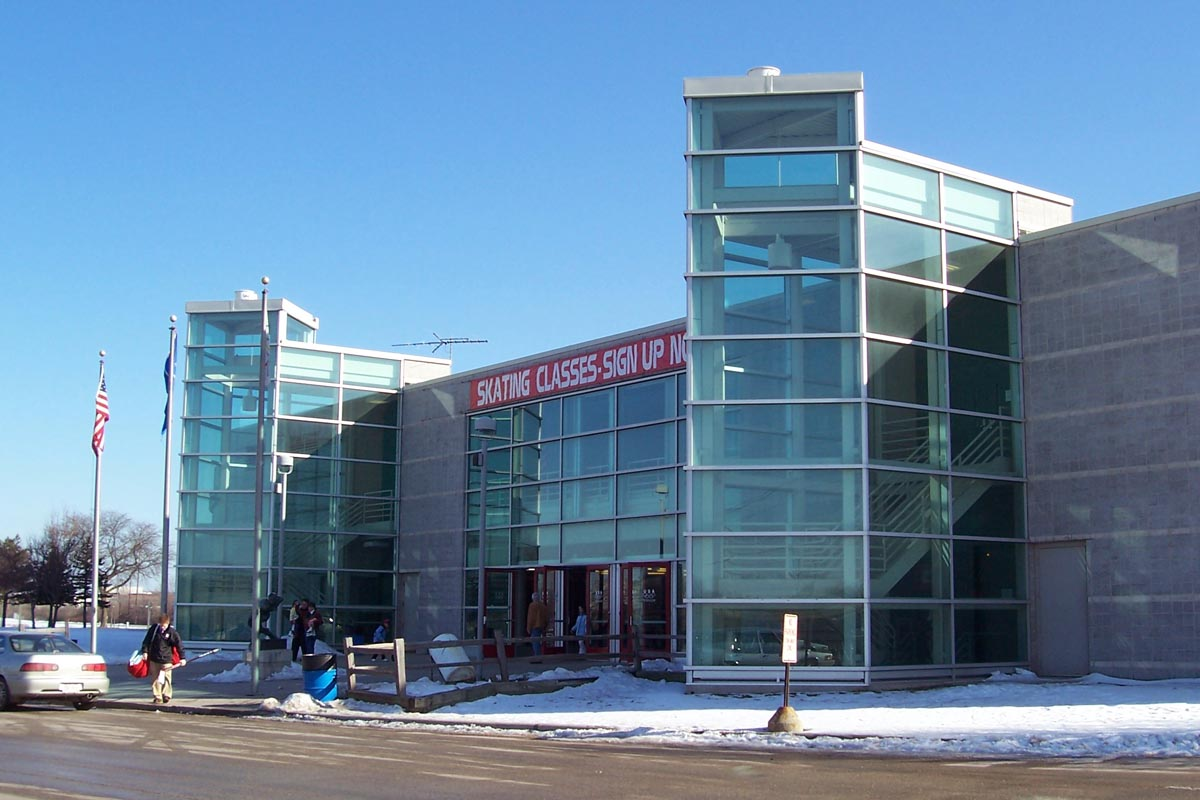
Pettit National Ice Center

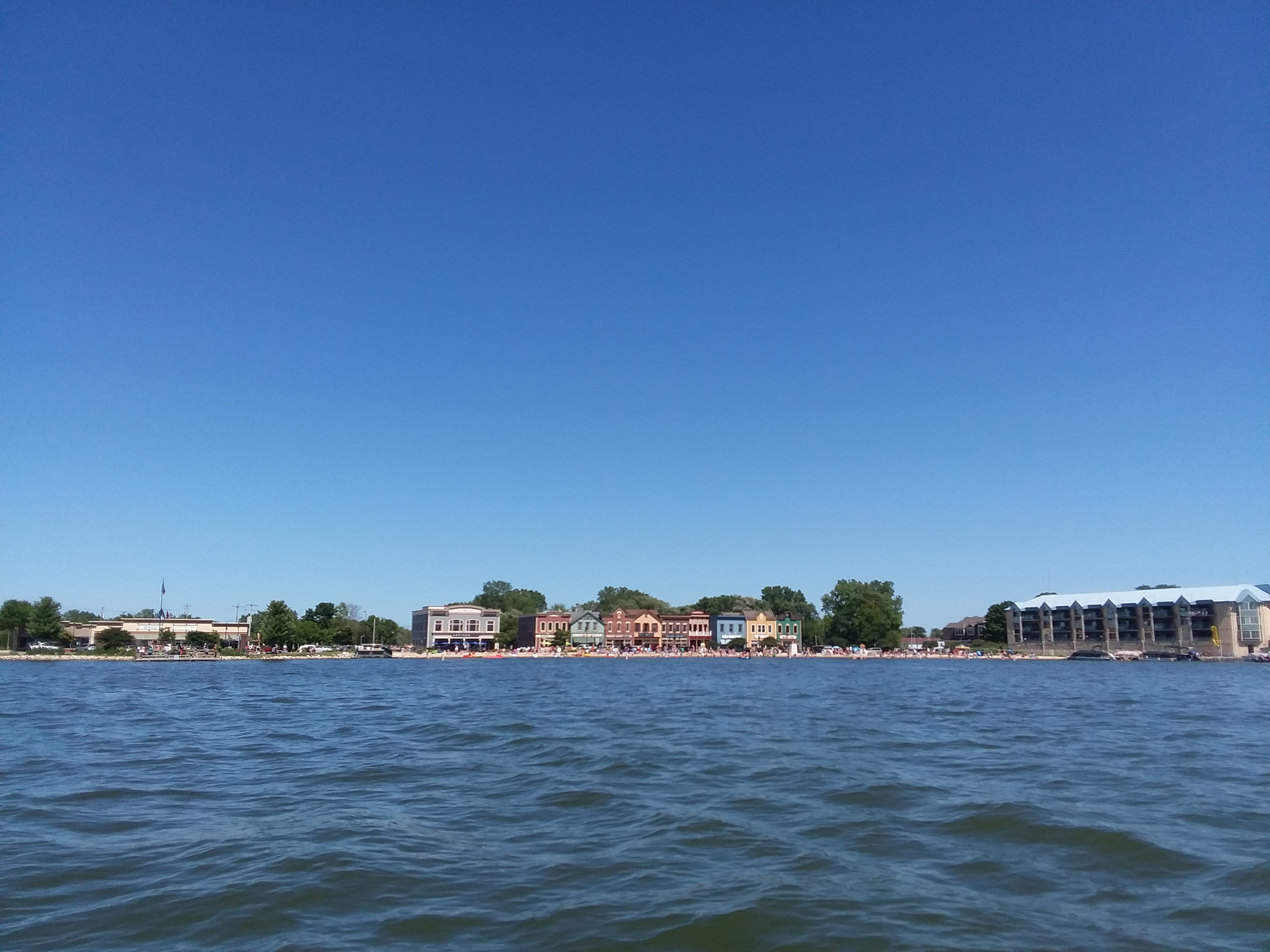
Pewaukee lakefront

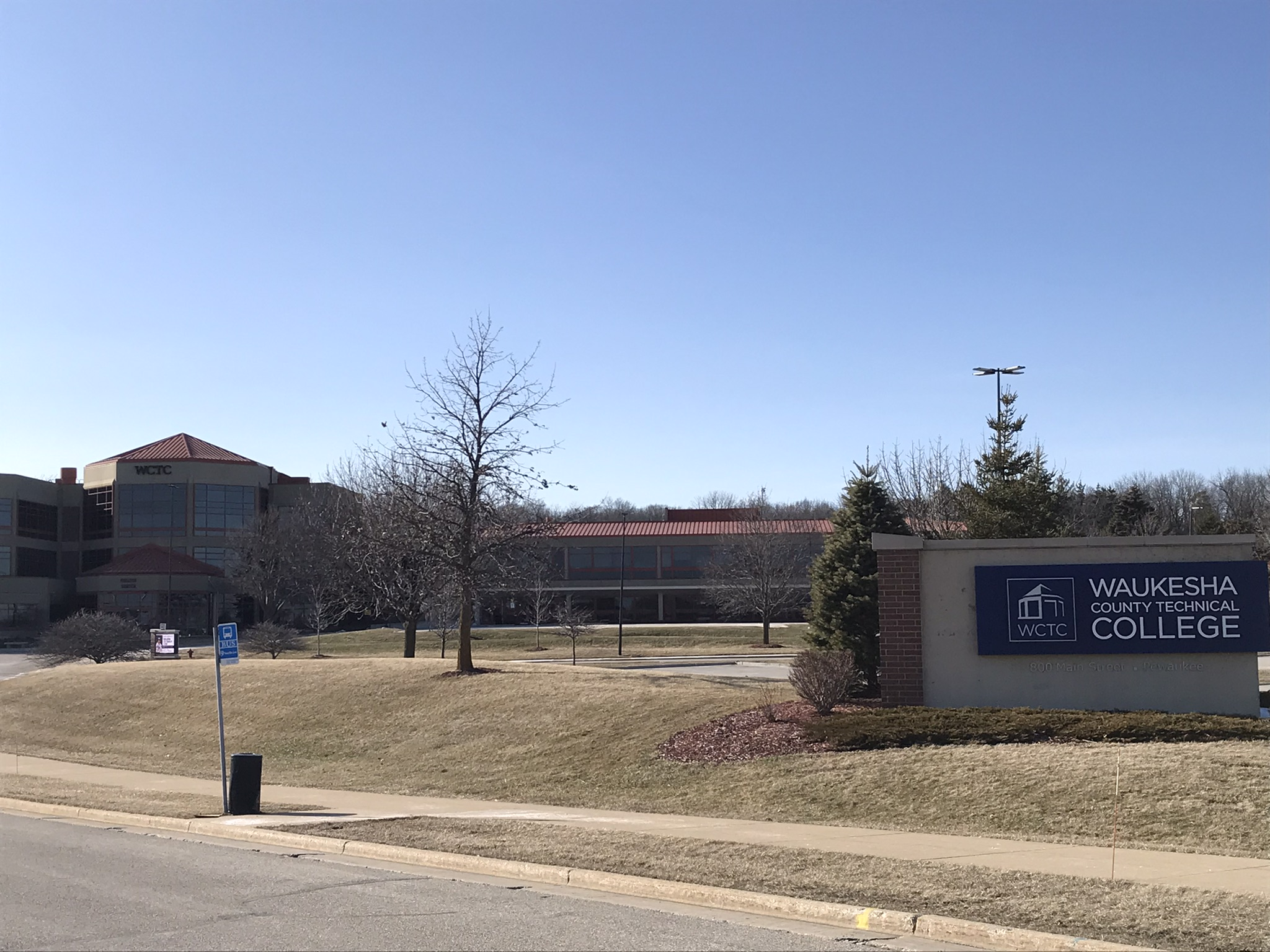
Waukesha County Technical College

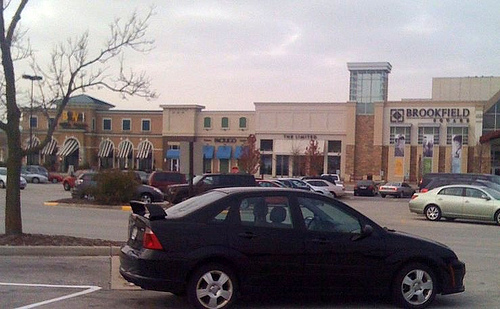
Brookfield Square

== List of senators ==
A list of all previous senators from this district:

Member	Party	Electoral history	Years	Leg. Term	District
District established March 13, 1848, by Art. XIV, Wis. Const.
Henry M. Billings (Highland)	Democratic	Elected to the short term in May 1848.	June 5, 1848 – January 1, 1849	1st	Iowa County
Montgomery M. Cothren (Mineral Point)	Democratic	Elected in 1848.	January 1, 1849 – January 6, 1851	2nd 3rd	Iowa County
Levi Sterling (Mineral Point)	Whig	Elected in 1850.	January 6, 1851 – January 3, 1853	4th 5th	Iowa County
Edward M. Hunter (Milwaukee)	Democratic	Elected in 1852.	January 3, 1853 – January 1, 1855	6th 7th	Northern Milwaukee County: Town of Granville; Town of Milwaukee; Town of Wauwatosa; Wards 1, 2, City of Milwaukee
Jackson Hadley (Milwaukee)	Democratic	Elected in 1854.	January 1, 1855 – January 5, 1857	8th 9th	Northern Milwaukee County: Town of Granville; Town of Milwaukee; Town of Wauwatosa; Wards 1, 2, City of Milwaukee
Augustus Greulich (Milwaukee)	Democratic	Elected in 1856.	January 5, 1857 – January 3, 1859	10th 11th	Northern Milwaukee County: Town of Granville; Town of Milwaukee; Wards 1, 2, 6, 7, city of Milwaukee
Cicero Comstock (Milwaukee)	Republican	Elected in 1858.	January 3, 1859 – January 7, 1861	12th 13th	Northern Milwaukee County: Town of Granville; Town of Milwaukee; Wards 1, 2, 6, 7, city of Milwaukee
Charles Quentin (Milwaukee)	Democratic	Elected in 1860. Died in office.	January 7, 1861 – May 8, 1862	14th	Northern Milwaukee County: Town of Granville; Town of Milwaukee; Wards 1, 2, 6, 7, city of Milwaukee
Charles Quentin (Milwaukee)	Democratic	Elected in 1860. Died in office.	January 7, 1861 – May 8, 1862	15th	Northern Milwaukee County: Town of Granville; Town of Milwaukee; Wards 1, 2, 6, 7, 9, city of Milwaukee
--Vacant--			May 8, 1862 – June 1, 1862	15th	Northern Milwaukee County: Town of Granville; Town of Milwaukee; Wards 1, 2, 6, 7, 9, city of Milwaukee
Francis Huebschmann (Milwaukee)	Democratic	Elected in 1862 special.	June 1, 1862 – January 5, 1863	15th	Northern Milwaukee County: Town of Granville; Town of Milwaukee; Wards 1, 2, 6, 7, 9, city of Milwaukee
William K. Wilson (Milwaukee)	Democratic	Elected in 1862, 1864.	January 5, 1863 – January 7, 1867	16th 17th 18th 19th	Northern Milwaukee County: Town of Granville; Town of Milwaukee; Wards 1, 2, 6, 7, 9, city of Milwaukee
Jackson Hadley (Milwaukee)	Democratic	Elected in 1866. Died in office.	January 7, 1867 – March 3, 1867	20th	Northern Milwaukee County: Town of Granville; Town of Milwaukee; Town of Wauwatosa; Wards 1, 2, 6, 7, 9, city of Milwaukee
--Vacant--			March 3, 1867 – March 20, 1867	20th	Northern Milwaukee County: Town of Granville; Town of Milwaukee; Town of Wauwatosa; Wards 1, 2, 6, 7, 9, city of Milwaukee
Henry L. Palmer (Milwaukee)	Democratic	Elected in 1867 special.	March 20, 1867 – January 4, 1869	20th	Northern Milwaukee County: Town of Granville; Town of Milwaukee; Town of Wauwatosa; Wards 1, 2, 6, 7, 9, city of Milwaukee
Henry L. Palmer (Milwaukee)	Democratic	Elected in 1867 special.	March 20, 1867 – January 4, 1869	21st	Northern Milwaukee County: Town of Granville; Town of Milwaukee; Town of Wauwatosa; Wards 1, 2, 6, 7, 9, city of Milwaukee
William Pitt Lynde (Milwaukee)	Democratic	Elected in 1868.	January 4, 1869 – January 2, 1871	22nd 23rd	Northern Milwaukee County: Town of Granville; Town of Milwaukee; Town of Wauwatosa; Wards 1, 2, 6, 7, 9, city of Milwaukee
Francis Huebschmann (Milwaukee)	Democratic	Elected in 1870. Redistricted to 3rd district.	January 2, 1871 – January 1, 1872	24th	Northern Milwaukee County: Town of Granville; Town of Milwaukee; Town of Wauwatosa; Wards 1, 2, 6, 7, 9, city of Milwaukee
Philo Belden (Rochester)	Republican	Redistricted from 7th district.	January 1, 1872 – January 6, 1873	25th	Racine County
Robert Hall Baker (Racine)	Republican	Elected in 1872. Resigned.	January 6, 1873 – September 1873	26th	Racine County
--Vacant--			September 1873 – January 5, 1874	26th	Racine County
Charles Herrick (Racine)	Liberal; Republican	Elected in 1873 special.	January 5, 1874 – January 4, 1875	27th	Racine County
Robert Hall Baker (Racine)	Republican	Elected in 1874.	January 4, 1875 – January 1, 1877	28th 29th	Racine County
Isaac W. Van Schaick (Milwaukee)	Republican	Elected in 1876, 1878, 1880.	January 1, 1877 – January 1, 1883	30th 31st 32nd 33rd 34th 35th	Northern Milwaukee County: Town of Granville; Town of Milwaukee; Town of Wauwatosa; Wards 1, 6, 9, 10, 13, city of Milwaukee
Jedd P. C. Cottrill (Milwaukee)	Democratic	Elected in 1882.	January 1, 1883 – January 3, 1887	36th 37th	Northern Milwaukee County: Town of Granville; Town of Milwaukee; Town of Wauwatosa; Wards 1, 6, 9, 10, 13, city of Milwaukee
Theodore Fritz (Milwaukee)	People's	Elected in 1886.	January 3, 1887 – January 5, 1891	38th	Northern Milwaukee County: Town of Granville; Town of Milwaukee; Town of Wauwatosa; Wards 1, 6, 9, 10, 13, city of Milwaukee
Theodore Fritz (Milwaukee)	People's	Elected in 1886.	January 3, 1887 – January 5, 1891	39th	Central Milwaukee County: Wards 2, 4, 7, 15, 16, city of Milwaukee
Paul Bechtner (Milwaukee)	Democratic	Elected in 1890.	January 5, 1891 – January 7, 1895	40th	Central Milwaukee County: Wards 2, 4, 7, 15, 16, city of Milwaukee
Paul Bechtner (Milwaukee)	Democratic	Elected in 1890.	January 5, 1891 – January 7, 1895	41st	Central Milwaukee County: Wards 5, 8, 12, 15, 16, city of Milwaukee
William H. Austin (Milwaukee)	Republican	Elected in 1894.	January 7, 1895 – January 2, 1899	42nd	Central Milwaukee County: Wards 5, 8, 12, 15, 16, city of Milwaukee
William H. Austin (Milwaukee)	Republican	Elected in 1894.	January 7, 1895 – January 2, 1899	43rd	Central Milwaukee County: Wards 1, 2, 3, 4, 7, 15, 16, city of Milwaukee
Frank A. Anson (Milwaukee)	Republican	Elected in 1898.	January 2, 1899 – January 5, 1903	44th 45th	Central Milwaukee County: Wards 1, 2, 3, 4, 7, 15, 16, city of Milwaukee
Charles C. Rogers (Milwaukee)	Republican	Elected in 1902.	January 5, 1903 – January 7, 1907	46th 47th	Central Milwaukee County: Wards 2, 3, 4, 6, 7, 15, 16, City of Milwaukee
Edward T. Fairchild (Milwaukee)	Republican	Elected in 1906.	January 7, 1907 – January 2, 1911	48th 49th	Central Milwaukee County: Wards 2, 3, 4, 6, 7, 15, 16, City of Milwaukee
George J. Weigle (Milwaukee)	Republican	Elected in 1910.	January 2, 1911 – January 4, 1915	50th	Central Milwaukee County: Wards 2, 3, 4, 6, 7, 15, 16, City of Milwaukee
George J. Weigle (Milwaukee)	Republican	Elected in 1910.	January 2, 1911 – January 4, 1915	51st	Western Milwaukee County: Town of Wauwatosa; City of Wauwatosa; Wards 15, 16, 19, 20, 22, City of Milwaukee
Edward T. Fairchild (Milwaukee)	Republican	Elected in 1914. Appointed circuit judge.	January 4, 1915 – September 25, 1916	52nd	Western Milwaukee County: Town of Wauwatosa; City of Wauwatosa; Wards 15, 16, 19, 20, 22, City of Milwaukee
--Vacant--			September 25, 1916 – January 1, 1917	52nd	Western Milwaukee County: Town of Wauwatosa; City of Wauwatosa; Wards 15, 16, 19, 20, 22, City of Milwaukee
Henry Otto Reinnoldt (Milwaukee)	Republican	Elected in 1916 special.	January 1, 1917 – January 6, 1919	53rd	Western Milwaukee County: Town of Wauwatosa; City of Wauwatosa; Wards 15, 16, 19, 20, 22, City of Milwaukee
Rudolph Beyer (Milwaukee)	Socialist	Elected in 1918.	January 6, 1919 – January 1, 1923	54th 55th	Western Milwaukee County: Town of Wauwatosa; City of Wauwatosa; Wards 15, 16, 19, 20, 22, City of Milwaukee
Bernhard Gettelman (Milwaukee)	Republican	Elected in 1922, 1926, 1930.	January 1, 1923 – January 7, 1935	56th 57th 58th 59th 60th	Central Milwaukee County: Wards 15, 19, 20, 22, city of Milwaukee
Bernhard Gettelman (Milwaukee)	Republican	Elected in 1922, 1926, 1930.	January 1, 1923 – January 7, 1935	61st	Central Milwaukee County: Wards 9, 15, 19, 22, 26, city of Milwaukee
Harold V. Schoenecker (Milwaukee)	Democratic	Elected in 1934.	January 7, 1935 – January 2, 1939	62nd 63rd	Central Milwaukee County: Wards 9, 15, 19, 22, 26, city of Milwaukee
Bernhard Gettelman (Milwaukee)	Republican	Elected in 1938, 1942, 1946, 1950. Resigned.	January 2, 1939 – April 29, 1954	64th 65th 66th 67th 68th 69th 70th	Central Milwaukee County: Wards 9, 15, 19, 22, 26, city of Milwaukee
Bernhard Gettelman (Milwaukee)	Republican	Elected in 1938, 1942, 1946, 1950. Resigned.	January 2, 1939 – April 29, 1954	71st	Central Milwaukee County: Wards 9, 15, 19, 22, 26, city of Milwaukee
--Vacant--			April 29, 1954 – January 3, 1955	71st	Central Milwaukee County: Wards 9, 15, 19, 22, 26, city of Milwaukee
Walter L. Merten (Milwaukee)	Republican	Elected in 1954.	January 3, 1955 – January 5, 1959	72nd 73rd	Central Milwaukee County: Wards 5, 9, 15, city of Milwaukee
James B. Brennan (Milwaukee)	Democratic	Elected in 1958. Appointed U.S. attorney.	January 5, 1959 – April 29, 1961	74th	Central Milwaukee County: Wards 5, 9, 15, city of Milwaukee
James B. Brennan (Milwaukee)	Democratic	Elected in 1958. Appointed U.S. attorney.	January 5, 1959 – April 29, 1961	75th	Central Milwaukee County: Wards 5, 9, 15, city of Milwaukee
--Vacant--			April 29, 1961 – January 7, 1963	75th	Central Milwaukee County: Wards 5, 9, 15, city of Milwaukee
Charles J. Schmidt (Milwaukee)	Democratic	Elected in 1962. Resigned.	January 7, 1963 – May 10, 1964	76th	Central Milwaukee County: Wards 5, 9, 15, city of Milwaukee
--Vacant--			May 10, 1964 – January 4, 1965	76th	Central Milwaukee County: Wards 5, 9, 15, city of Milwaukee
Wilfred Schuele (Milwaukee)	Democratic	Elected in 1964 special. Re-elected in 1966, 1970.	January 4, 1965 – January 6, 1975	77th 78th 79th 80th	Northern Milwaukee County: Wards 2, 9, 15, city of Milwaukee; Wards 4, 5, city of Glendale
Wilfred Schuele (Milwaukee)	Democratic	Elected in 1964 special. Re-elected in 1966, 1970.	January 4, 1965 – January 6, 1975	81st	Northwest Milwaukee County: Assembly Dist. 13, 14, 15
David G. Berger (Milwaukee)	Democratic	Elected in 1974, 1978.	January 6, 1975 – January 3, 1983	82nd 83rd 84th 85th	Northwest Milwaukee County: Assembly Dist. 13, 14, 15
Mordecai Lee (Milwaukee)	Democratic	Elected in 1982, 1986. Resigned.	January 3, 1983 – September 1, 1989	86th 87th 88th	Northwest Milwaukee County: Wards 19-21, 25-28, 31-39, 80-89, 125-127, 129, 130, 133-135, 139, 141, 142, 170, 172, 174-177, 180-182, 282-295, 299, 300, 309, 310, city of Milwaukee
Mordecai Lee (Milwaukee)	Democratic	Elected in 1982, 1986. Resigned.	January 3, 1983 – September 1, 1989	89th	Northwest Milwaukee County: Wards 19-21, 25-28, 31-39, 80-89, 125-127, 129, 130, 133-135, 139, 141, 142, 170, 172, 174-177, 180-182, 282-295, 299, 300, 309, 310, city of Milwaukee
--Vacant--			September 1, 1989 – December 13, 1989	89th	Northwest Milwaukee County: Wards 19-21, 25-28, 31-39, 80-89, 125-127, 129, 130, 133-135, 139, 141, 142, 170, 172, 174-177, 180-182, 282-295, 299, 300, 309, 310, city of Milwaukee
Tom Barrett (Milwaukee)	Democratic	Elected in 1989 special. Re-elected in 1990. Elected to U.S. House.	December 13, 1989 – January 3, 1993	89th	Northwest Milwaukee County: Wards 19-21, 25-28, 31-39, 80-89, 125-127, 129, 130, 133-135, 139, 141, 142, 170, 172, 174-177, 180-182, 282-295, 299, 300, 309, 310, city of Milwaukee
Tom Barrett (Milwaukee)	Democratic	Elected in 1989 special. Re-elected in 1990. Elected to U.S. House.	December 13, 1989 – January 3, 1993	90th	Northwest Milwaukee County: Wards 19-21, 25-28, 31-39, 80-89, 125-127, 129, 130, 133-135, 139, 141, 142, 170, 172, 174-177, 180-182, 282-295, 299, 300, 309, 310, city of Milwaukee
--Vacant--			January 3, 1993 – April 20, 1993	91st	Western Milwaukee County: City of Wauwatosa; Wards 30, 31, 39-41, 81-101, 131, 286, 288, 289, city of Milwaukee; Wards 1-23, 27-29, city of West Allis
Peggy Rosenzweig (Wauwatosa)	Republican	Elected in 1993 special. Re-elected in 1994, 1998.	April 20, 1993 – January 6, 2003	91st	Western Milwaukee County: City of Wauwatosa; Wards 30, 31, 39-41, 81-101, 131, 286, 288, 289, city of Milwaukee; Wards 1-23, 27-29, city of West Allis
Peggy Rosenzweig (Wauwatosa)	Republican	Elected in 1993 special. Re-elected in 1994, 1998.	April 20, 1993 – January 6, 2003	92nd 93rd 94th 95th	Western Milwaukee County: City of Wauwatosa; Wards 30, 31, 39-41, 81-101, 131, 286, 288, 289, city of Milwaukee; Wards 1-23, 27-29, city of West Allis
Thomas G. Reynolds (West Allis)	Republican	Elected in 2002.	January 6, 2003 – January 1, 2007	96th 97th	Western Milwaukee County and eastern Waukesha County: Milwaukee County; City of Wauwatosa; City of West Allis; Village of West Milwaukee; Wards 37, 85-94, 191, 192, 282-289, city of Milwaukee; Waukesha County; Village of Elm Grove; Wards 1-3, 7, 9, 15, 23, 24, city of Brookfield
Jim Sullivan (Wauwatosa)	Democratic	Elected in 2006.	January 1, 2007 – January 3, 2011	98th 99th	Western Milwaukee County and eastern Waukesha County: Milwaukee County; City of Wauwatosa; City of West Allis; Village of West Milwaukee; Wards 37, 85-94, 191, 192, 282-289, city of Milwaukee; Waukesha County; Village of Elm Grove; Wards 1-3, 7, 9, 15, 23, 24, city of Brookfield
Leah Vukmir (Wauwatosa)	Rep.	Elected in 2010.	January 3, 2011 – January 7, 2019	100th	Western Milwaukee County and eastern Waukesha County: Milwaukee County; City of Wauwatosa; City of West Allis; Village of West Milwaukee; Wards 37, 85-94, 191, 192, 282-289, city of Milwaukee; Waukesha County; Village of Elm Grove; Wards 1-3, 7, 9, 15, 23, 24, city of Brookfield
Leah Vukmir (Wauwatosa)	Rep.	Elected in 2010.	January 3, 2011 – January 7, 2019	101st	Western Milwaukee County and eastern Waukesha County: Assembly Dist. 13, 14, 15
Leah Vukmir (Wauwatosa)	Rep.	Re-elected in 2014. Ran for U.S. Senate.	January 3, 2011 – January 7, 2019	102nd 103rd	Western Milwaukee County and eastern Waukesha County: Assembly Dist. 13, 14, 15
Dale P. Kooyenga (Brookfield)	Republican	Elected in 2018.	January 7, 2019 – January 2, 2023	104th 105th	Western Milwaukee County and eastern Waukesha County: Assembly Dist. 13, 14, 15
Rob Hutton (Brookfield)	Republican	Elected in 2022.	January 2, 2023 – Current	106th	Western Milwaukee County; Eastern Waukesha County
Rob Hutton (Brookfield)	Republican	Elected in 2022.	January 2, 2023 – Current	107th	Western Milwaukee County; Eastern Waukesha County
Robyn Vining (Wauwatosa)	Democratic	Elected in 2026.	taking office January 2027	108th	Western Milwaukee County; Eastern Waukesha County
