= Jackson Hadley =

American politician (1815–1867)

Member of the Wisconsin Senate from the 5th district
- In office January 7, 1867 – March 3, 1867
- Preceded by: William K. Wilson
- Succeeded by: Henry L. Palmer
- In office January 1, 1855 – January 5, 1857
- Preceded by: Edward M. Hunter
- Succeeded by: Augustus Greulich

Member of the Wisconsin State Assembly from the Milwaukee 1st district
- In office January 2, 1865 – January 7, 1867
- Preceded by: Levi Hubbell
- Succeeded by: George W. Clason
- In office January 2, 1854 – January 1, 1855
- Preceded by: John Hubbard Tweedy
- Succeeded by: James B. Cross

Personal details
- Born: May 22, 1815 Livonia, New York, U.S.
- Died: March 3, 1867 (aged 51) Milwaukee, Wisconsin, U.S.
- Cause of death: Stroke
- Resting place: Forest Home Cemetery; Milwaukee, Wisconsin
- Party: Democratic
- Spouse: Sarah Augusta Hopkins

Jackson Hadley (May 22, 1815 – March 3, 1867) was an American businessman, Democratic politician, and Wisconsin pioneer. He served three years each in the Wisconsin Senate (1855, 1856, 1867) and state Assembly (1854, 1865, 1866), representing the northern half of Milwaukee County. He was a political ally and business partner of Milwaukee founder Byron Kilbourn, and was implicated in Kilbourn's massive railroad corruption scheme, in which dozens of legislators in the 9th Wisconsin Legislature were bribed with railroad bonds.

== Biography ==
Born in Livonia, New York, he was a school teacher and principal in New York state. In 1849, he moved to Milwaukee, Wisconsin, and was in the produce and railroad businesses. He served on the Milwaukee Common Council and was the president. He also served on the Milwaukee County Board of Supervisors.

In the railroad business, he was a friend and business partner of Byron Kilbourn, and was implicated in the scandal in which Kilbourn was accused of bribing Wisconsin legislators to obtain land grants for railroad construction.

In 1854, 1865, and 1866, he served in the Wisconsin State Assembly; he served in the Wisconsin State Senate in 1855, 1856, and 1867.

During the 1867 legislative session, while his limbs were paralyzed and he could not walk, he actively participated in senate business as long as possible. He returned to his home in Milwaukee a few days before his death there on March 3, 1867.

Wisconsin State Assembly
| Preceded by John Hubbard Tweedy | Member of the Wisconsin State Assembly from the Milwaukee 1st district January 2, 1854 – January 1, 1855 | Succeeded by James B. Cross |
| Preceded by Levi Hubbell | Member of the Wisconsin State Assembly from the Milwaukee 1st district January 2, 1865 – January 7, 1867 | Succeeded by George W. Clason |
Wisconsin Senate
| Preceded by Edward M. Hunter | Member of the Wisconsin Senate from the 5th district January 1, 1855 – January 5, 1857 | Succeeded by Augustus Greulich |
| Preceded by William K. Wilson | Member of the Wisconsin Senate from the 5th district January 7, 1867 – March 3, 1867 | Succeeded by Henry L. Palmer |
