= Edward T. Fairchild (judge) =

20th century American judge

The Honorable Edward T. Fairchild
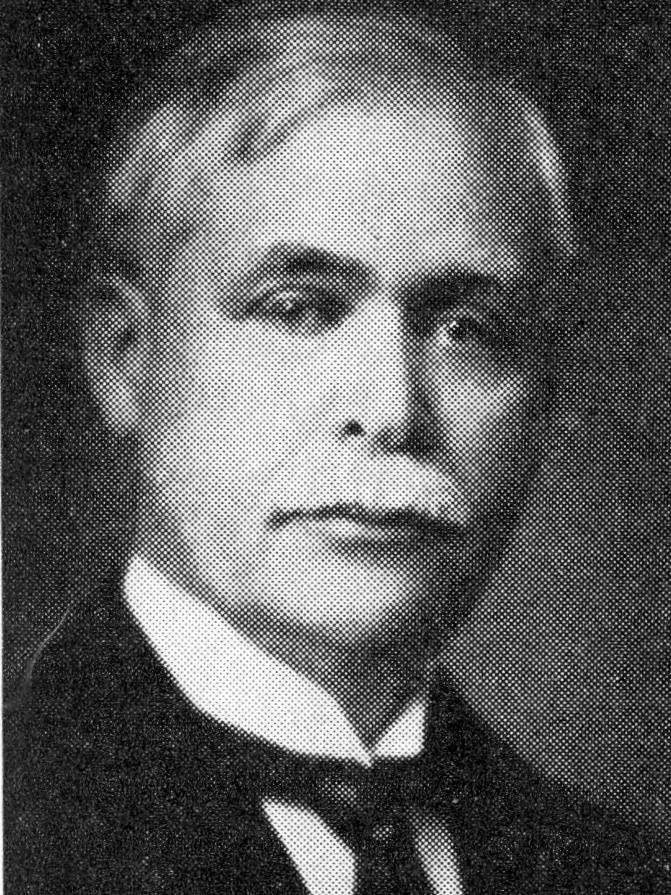
- Fairchild, circa 1940

15th Chief Justice of the Wisconsin Supreme Court
- In office January 1, 1954 – January 7, 1957
- Preceded by: Oscar M. Fritz
- Succeeded by: John E. Martin

Justice of the Wisconsin Supreme Court
- In office April 30, 1930 – January 7, 1957
- Appointed by: Walter J. Kohler, Sr.
- Preceded by: Franz C. Eschweiler
- Succeeded by: Thomas E. Fairchild

Wisconsin Circuit Court Judge of the 2nd Circuit, Branch 6
- In office September 1916 – April 30, 1930
- Appointed by: Emanuel L. Philipp
- Preceded by: Franz C. Eschweiler
- Succeeded by: John C. Kleczka

Member of the Wisconsin Senate from the 5th district
- In office January 13, 1915 – September 1916
- Preceded by: George J. Weigle
- Succeeded by: Henry Otto Reinnoldt
- In office January 9, 1907 – January 11, 1911
- Preceded by: Charles Cassius Rogers
- Succeeded by: George J. Weigle

Personal details
- Born: Edward Thomas Fairchild; June 17, 1872 Towanda, Pennsylvania, U.S.
- Died: October 29, 1965 (aged 93) Madison, Wisconsin, U.S.
- Resting place: Green Mount Cemetery; Dansville, New York
- Party: Republican
- Spouses: Helen McCurdy Edwards; (m. 1903; died 1962)
- Children: Anne Edwards (Carter)^{(b. 1905; died 1998)}; Thomas Edward Fairchild^{(b. 1912; died 2007)}; 3 others

Edward Thomas Fairchild (June 17, 1872 – October 29, 1965) was an American jurist and legislator from Milwaukee, Wisconsin. He was the 15th chief justice of the Wisconsin Supreme Court; he served on the Court for 27 years, from 1930 to 1957. Before that, he served 14 years as a Wisconsin circuit court judge in Milwaukee County. He also represented central Milwaukee County for six years as a Republican in the Wisconsin Senate. His son, Thomas E. Fairchild, was also a justice of the Wisconsin Supreme Court and a judge of the U.S. 7th Circuit Court of Appeals.

== Early life and education ==
Born in Towanda, Pennsylvania, Fairchild grew up in Dansville, New York, where he was educated. He was employed in a newspaper and studied law in the office of Rowe and Coyne. Later, he bought a farm in Dansville, where he would go to for vacations.

== Career ==
After being admitted to the New York bar, he moved to Milwaukee, Wisconsin, where he worked in the district attorney's office.

In 1906 he was elected to his first of three terms in the Wisconsin State Senate, ultimately serving in the 48th, 49th, and 52nd sessions of the Wisconsin legislature. In 1916, during the 52nd session of the legislature, he was appointed a Wisconsin circuit court judge in Milwaukee County.

In 1930, Fairchild was appointed to the Wisconsin Supreme Court and served as chief justice from 1954 until his retirement in 1957. He was re-elected in 1936 and 1946.

In 1957, he administered the oath of office when his son, Thomas E. Fairchild, was sworn in as a member of the Wisconsin Supreme Court. Thomas had been elected Edward's seat in 1956. He died in Madison Wisconsin in 1965 at 93

== Notes ==
Wisconsin Senate
Preceded by Charles Cassius Rogers	Member of the Wisconsin Senate from the 5th district 1907 – 1911	Succeeded by George J. Weigle
Preceded by George J. Weigle	Member of the Wisconsin Senate from the 5th district 1915 – 1916	Succeeded by Henry Otto Reinnoldt
Legal offices
Preceded by Franz C. Eschweiler	Wisconsin Circuit Court Judge of the 2nd Circuit, Branch 6; 1916 – 1930	Succeeded by John C. Kleczka
Preceded by Franz C. Eschweiler	Justice of the Wisconsin Supreme Court; 1930 – 1957	Succeeded by Thomas E. Fairchild
Preceded by Oscar M. Fritz	Chief Justice of the Wisconsin Supreme Court; 1954 – 1957	Succeeded by John E. Martin
