= Cicero Comstock =

19th century American politician

Member of the Wisconsin Senate from the 5th district
- In office January 3, 1859 – January 7, 1861
- Preceded by: Augustus Greulich
- Succeeded by: Charles Quentin

1st Comptroller of Milwaukee
- In office March 1852 – March 1854
- Preceded by: Position established
- Succeeded by: John B. Edwards

Personal details
- Born: March 20, 1817 Worthington, Ohio, U.S.
- Died: February 7, 1871 (aged 53) Milwaukee, Wisconsin, U.S.
- Cause of death: Pneumonia
- Resting place: Forest Home Cemetery, Milwaukee
- Party: Republican; Whig (before 1854)
- Spouses: Charlotte Sophia Stiles (m. 1837; died 1843); Caroline Griswold (m. 1844; died 1862)
- Children: with Charlotte Stiles; Henrietta Mosier (Butler)^{(b. 1838; died 1920)}; Eugene Renssellaer Comstock^{(b. 1841; died 1841)}; Wertler Legrand Comstock^{(b. 1842; died 1843)}; with Caroline Griswold; Henry Griswold Comstock^{(b. 1850; died 1937)}; James Tyng Comstock^{(b. 1853; died 1943)}; Lemora (Johnston)^{(b. 1859; died 1934)}; Mila Comstock^{(b. 1861; died 1890)}

Cicero Comstock (March 20, 1817 – February 7, 1871) was an American businessman, Republican politician, and Wisconsin pioneer. He served two years in the Wisconsin State Senate, representing northern Milwaukee County, and was the first city comptroller of Milwaukee.

== Biography ==
Cicero Comstock was born in Worthington, Ohio, in March 1817. He came to Milwaukee about 1845 and ran a general store in the old 2nd ward. He was quickly elected as a municipal tax assessor, and became involved in other business interests in the city, including several mills, dams, and the Marine Fire and Life Insurance Company. During the 1st Wisconsin Legislature, the Milwaukee College was established, and Comstock was designated one of the original trustees.

In 1852, the city of Milwaukee established the office of city comptroller, to provide better accounting of the city finances and credit. Comstock was the first man elected to the office that year, and was subsequently re-elected in 1853. He was defeated seeking re-election in 1854. In 1855, the "Peoples' Convention" of Milwaukee offered him their nomination for mayor, but he declined due to concern for his business interests.

Comstock was a member of the Whig Party, but due to the Democratic Party dominance of the city of Milwaukee, he generally ran for office on the "Peoples' Ticket". In the city of Milwaukee at this time, the "Peoples'" conventions comprised Whigs, Free Democrats, and Independents. After the creation of the Republican Party in the mid-1850s, Comstock became affiliated with that party. In 1858, he ran again for comptroller, but lost to the incumbent, E. L. H. Gardner. Later that year, however, he received the Republican nomination for Wisconsin State Senate in the 5th State Senate district—then comprising the northern half of Milwaukee County. He was narrowly elected in the November general election, defeating Democratic former state senator Jackson Hadley. His win was considered an upset; he was the only Republican to represent the district between 1852 and 1872, when it comprised the northern half of Milwaukee County.

After his Senate term, he was appointed to the board of the State Reform School, and was a member of the board of directors of the Madison Mutual Insurance Company. He was sent as a representative citizen of Wisconsin to the Paris Exposition of 1867.

Cicero Comstock was stricken by illness in the Winter of 1871. Ten days later, he died of pneumonia at his home in Milwaukee.

== Personal life and family ==
Cicero Comstock was the eldest child of Buckley Comstock, an Ohio pioneer who served as a member of the Ohio House of Representatives in 1839. His younger brother, Theodore, also served as a member of the Ohio House of Representatives in 1855, and his brother Leander traveled with him to Wisconsin.

Cicero Comstock married twice. He married his first wife, Charlotte Stiles, in 1837. They had three children together before her death in 1843. Comstock subsequently married Caroline Griswold, the daughter of George H. Griswold, who was twice elected mayor of Worthington, Ohio. The second marriage produced four more children before Caroline Comstock's death in 1862. Cicero Comstock was survived by five of his seven children.

== Electoral history ==
=== Milwaukee Comptroller (1852, 1853, 1854) ===
Milwaukee Comptroller Election, 1853
| Party | Candidate | Votes | % | ±% |
|---|---|---|---|---|
General Election, March 8, 1853
| Independent | Cicero Comstock (incumbent) | 2,149 | 58.07% | |
| Democratic | Gunnison | 1,552 | 41.93% | |
| Plurality | | 597 | 16.13% | |
| Total votes | | 3,701 | 100.0% | |
| Independent hold | | | | |

Milwaukee Comptroller Election, 1854
| Party | Candidate | Votes | % | ±% |
|---|---|---|---|---|
General Election, March 7, 1854
| Democratic | John B. Edwards | 2,872 | 62.58% | |
| Independent | Cicero Comstock (incumbent) | 1,717 | 37.42% | −20.65% |
| Plurality | | 1,155 | 25.17% | +9.04% |
| Total votes | | 4,589 | 100.0% | +23.99% |
| Democratic hold | | | | |

=== Wisconsin Senate (1858) ===
Wisconsin Senate, 5th District Election, 1858
| Party | Candidate | Votes | % | ±% |
|---|---|---|---|---|
General Election, November 2, 1858
| Republican | Cicero Comstock | 2,336 | 51.75% | |
| Democratic | Jackson Hadley | 2,178 | 48.25% | |
| Plurality | | 1,587 | 3.50% | |
| Total votes | | 4,514 | 100.0% | |
| Republican hold | | | | |

Wisconsin Senate
| Preceded by Augustus Greulich | Member of the Wisconsin Senate from the 5th district January 3, 1859 – January 7, 1861 | Succeeded by Charles Quentin |
Political offices
| New office established | Comptroller of Milwaukee from the 5th district March 1852 – March 1854 | Succeeded by John B. Edwards |
