= Francis Huebschmann =

American Civil War surgeon (1817–1880)

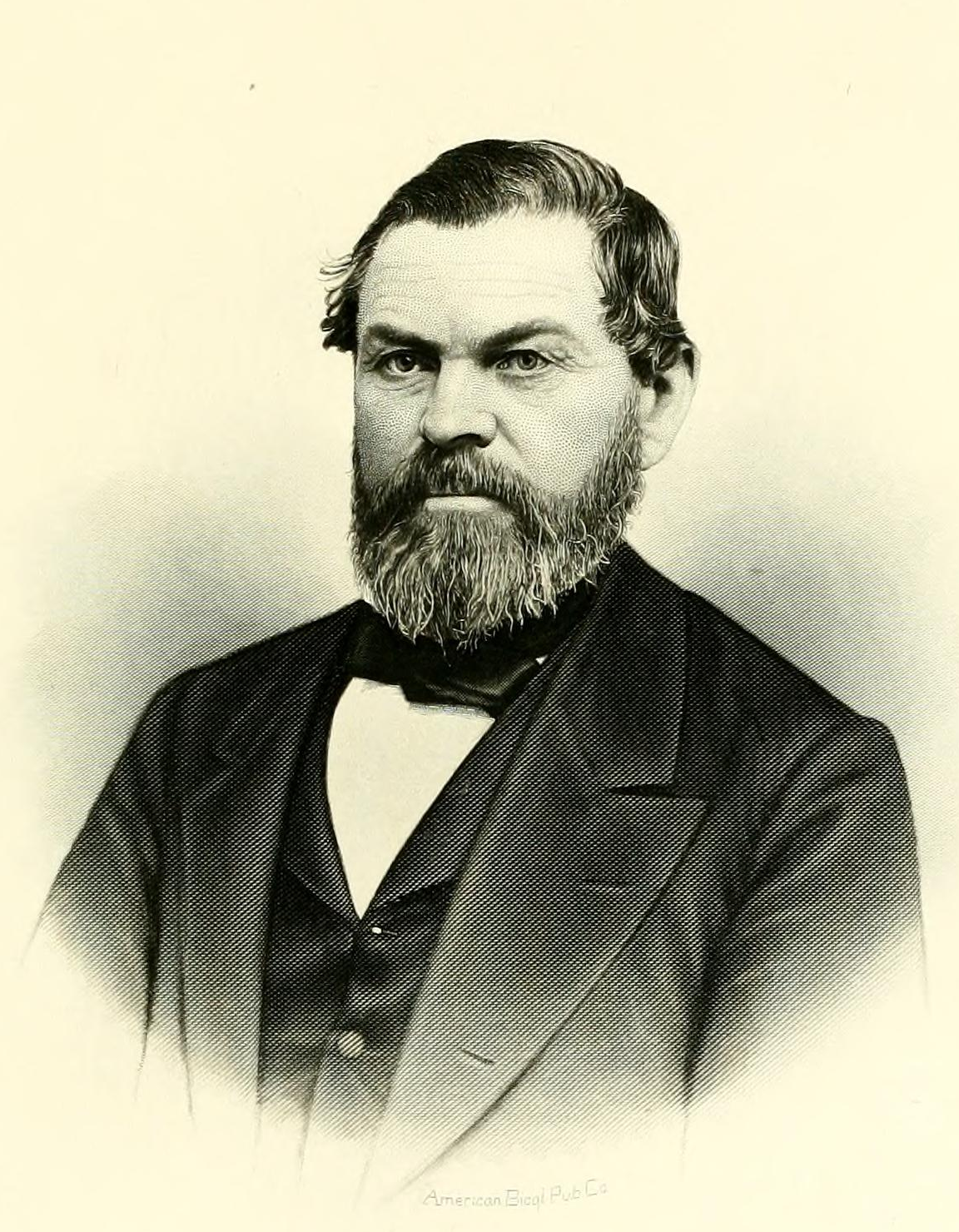
- From History of Milwaukee from its first settlement to the year 1895 (1895)

Member of the Wisconsin Senate from the 3rd district
- In office January 1, 1872 – January 6, 1873
- Preceded by: Lyman Morgan
- Succeeded by: Frederick W. Cotzhausen

Member of the Wisconsin Senate from the 5th district
- In office January 2, 1871 – January 1, 1872
- Preceded by: William Pitt Lynde
- Succeeded by: Philo Belden
- In office September 1, 1862 – January 5, 1863
- Preceded by: Charles Quentin
- Succeeded by: William K. Wilson

Member of the Wisconsin Senate from the 19th district
- In office January 6, 1851 – January 3, 1853
- Preceded by: John B. Smith
- Succeeded by: Benjamin Allen

Personal details
- Born: Franz Hübschmann; April 19, 1817 Riethnordhausen, Grand Duchy of Saxe-Weimar-Eisenach
- Died: March 21, 1880 (aged 62) Milwaukee, Wisconsin, U.S.
- Resting place: Forest Home Cemetery; Milwaukee, Wisconsin
- Party: Democratic
- Spouse(s): Creszentia (Hess) Huebschmann (died 1913)
- Children: Adolph Huebschmann (b. 1859; died 1921)
- Relatives: W. M. L. de Wette (uncle)
- Profession: physician, surgeon, politician

Military service
- Allegiance: United States
- Branch/service: United States Volunteers; Union Army
- Years of service: 1862–1864
- Rank: Surgeon
- Unit: 26th Reg. Wis. Vol. Infantry
- Battles/wars: American Civil War: Chancellorsville Campaign; Battle of Chancellorsville; Gettysburg campaign; Battle of Gettysburg; Chattanooga campaign; Atlanta campaign

Francis (Franz) Huebschmann (April 19, 1817 – March 21, 1880) was a German American immigrant, medical doctor, and Democratic politician. He served four and a half years in the Wisconsin State Senate, representing the northern half of Milwaukee County, and was a noted surgeon for the Union Army during the American Civil War.

== Biography ==
Francis Huebschmann was born in Riethnordhausen, in what was then the Grand Duchy of Saxe-Weimar-Eisenach (in modern-day Germany). He was educated at Erfurt and Weimar, and graduated in medicine at Jena in 1841.

He came to the United States in 1842, and settled in Milwaukee, where he resided until his death.

He was school commissioner from 1843 until 1851, a member of the first Wisconsin Constitutional Convention of 1846, and served on the committee on suffrage and elective franchise. He was a special champion of the provision in the constitution granting foreigners equal rights with Americans. He was a Democratic Party presidential elector in 1848, for Lewis Cass, a member of the Milwaukee City Council and a Milwaukee County supervisor from 1848 until 1867. He served three periods as Wisconsin State Senator, first from 1851 to 1852, second in 1862, and finally from 1871 to 1872. From 1853 until 1857, he was superintendent of the affairs of the Native Americans of the northern United States.

During the Civil War, he entered the Union Army in 1862 as surgeon of the 26th Wisconsin Infantry Regiment. He was surgeon in charge of a division at the Battle of Chancellorsville, and of the XI Corps at Gettysburg, where he was held by the Confederates for three days. He was also at the Battle of Chattanooga, in charge of the Corps hospital in Lookout Valley in 1864, and brigade surgeon in the Atlanta campaign. He was honorably discharged in that year, and, returning to Milwaukee, became connected with the United States General Hospital.

Wisconsin Senate
Preceded by John B. Smith	Member of the Wisconsin Senate from the 19th district January 6, 1851 – January 3, 1853	Succeeded by Benjamin Allen
Preceded by Charles Quentin	Member of the Wisconsin Senate from the 5th district September 1, 1862 – January 5, 1863	Succeeded by William K. Wilson
Preceded by William Pitt Lynde	Member of the Wisconsin Senate from the 5th district January 2, 1871 – January 1, 1872	Succeeded by Philo Belden
Preceded by Lyman Morgan	Member of the Wisconsin Senate from the 3rd district January 1, 1872 – January 6, 1873	Succeeded by Frederick W. Cotzhausen
