= R. N. Messenger =

19th-century American politician

Member of the Wisconsin Senate from the 19th district
- In office June 5, 1848 – January 1, 1849
- Preceded by: Position established
- Succeeded by: John B. Smith

Member of the Wisconsin State Assembly from the Milwaukee 2nd district
- In office June 6, 1853 – January 2, 1854
- Preceded by: Herman Haertel
- Succeeded by: William Reinhardt

Personal details
- Born: New York, U.S.
- Party: Democratic

Riley N. Messenger (sometimes spelled Messinger) was an American lawyer, teacher, and Wisconsin pioneer. He served as a Democratic member of the Wisconsin Senate during the 1st Wisconsin Legislature (1848). He later served in the Wisconsin State Assembly during the 1853 session.

== Background ==
Messenger came to Smithville, New York, about 1834 from Oneida, New York, settling in the Smithville Flats area. He practiced law there (from 1837 until the end of the Van Buren administration he also served as Postmaster of Smithville, a patronage appointment) until about 1841, when he moved to Milwaukee.

== In Milwaukee ==
In 1846 he was elected to the Milwaukee Board of School Directors from the Second Ward of Milwaukee, but was not re-elected for 1847. On February 18, 1847, he was the marshal from the Second Ward for the parade of Milwaukee Democrats held to support the first Wisconsin State Constitution. He was elected co-secretary of the subsequent meeting. In April 1847, he was elected Alderman for the Second Ward.

He represented the 19th Senate District (part of Milwaukee County) in the first session of the state legislature, which convened June 5, 1848, and adjourned August 21 of that year. He was succeeded in the next term by John B. Smith.

In the Spring of 1853, Milwaukee Assemblymember Herman Haertel was appointed state commissioner for immigration. Messenger was elected in a May special election to fill the remaining seven months of his term. Typically, in the legislative schedule of this era, no work would be happening in the Assembly this late into the year. In 1853, however, the Legislature was planning to re-convene in the Summer to handle the impeachment of Judge Levi Hubbell.

In 1853, he was on the board of directors of the new Milwaukee & Horicon Railroad, which was not a success and eventually was sold to the Milwaukee Road.

In 1856, he was in charge of the Hall of Fine Arts for the Wisconsin State Fair. (In 1852, Messenger had himself taken prizes for "Fine egg plants"; for "Best six varieties" of pansies, and for "Best collection of green-house plants owned by one person" at that year's State Fair.) He was the recording secretary of the Milwaukee Horticultural Society – Association for 1857, at which time he was a justice of the peace for the Sixth Ward of the City of Milwaukee.

== John Messenger ==
It is unknown whether Messenger was related to John Messenger, a contemporary fellow Milwaukee Democrat, who risked his life in helping captured fugitive slave Joshua Glover escape to safety after he was freed from jail.

Wisconsin State Assembly
Preceded by Herman Haertel	Member of the Wisconsin State Assembly from the Milwaukee 2nd district June 6, 1853 – January 2, 1854	Succeeded by William Reinhardt
Wisconsin Senate
New state government	Member of the Wisconsin Senate from the 19th district June 5, 1848 – January 1, 1849	Succeeded by John B. Smith
