= Henry L. Palmer =

19th-century American lawyer and politician

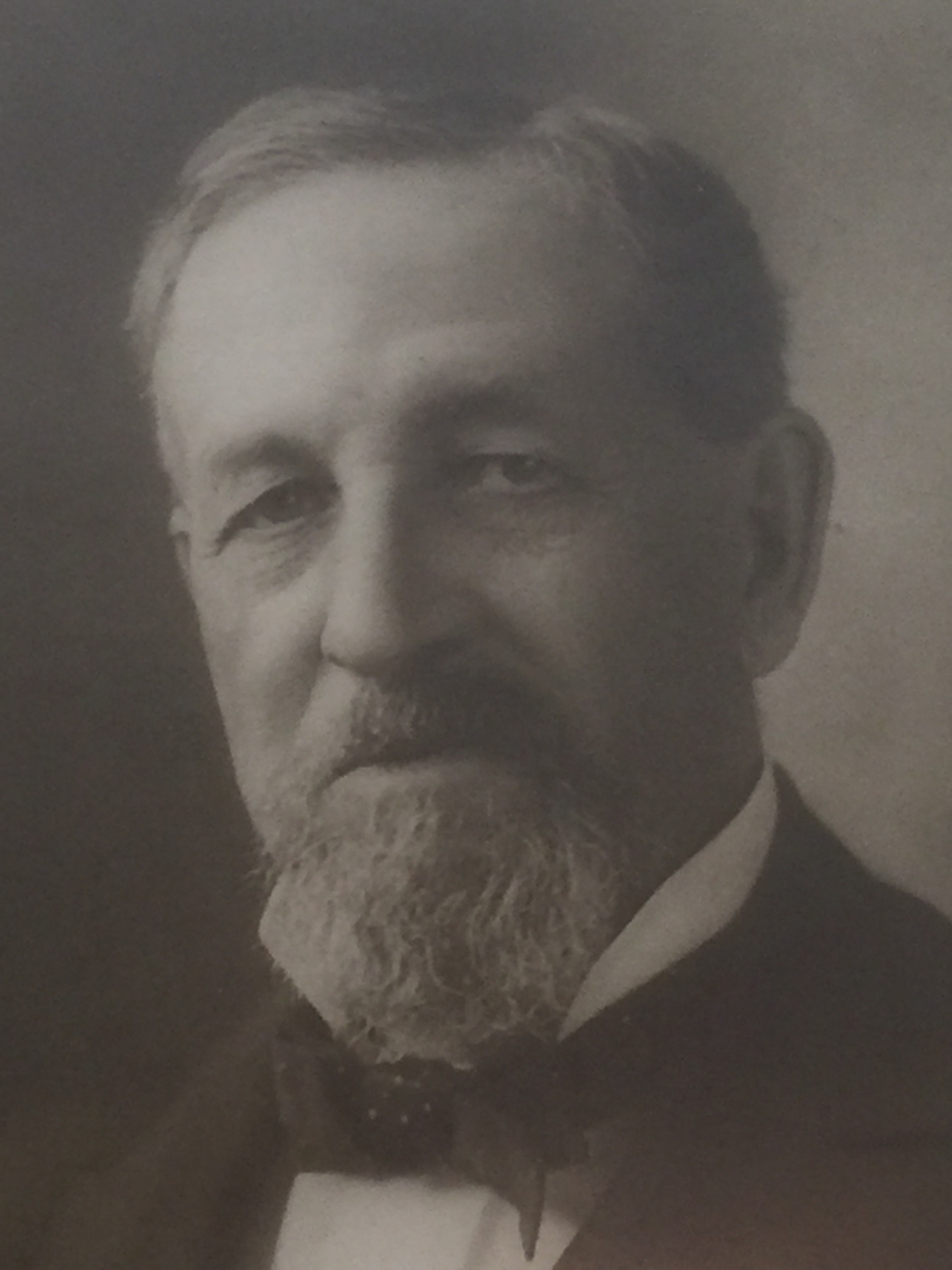

6th Speaker of the Wisconsin State Assembly
- In office January 3, 1853 – January 2, 1854
- Preceded by: James McMillan Shafter
- Succeeded by: Frederick W. Horn

Member of the Wisconsin Senate from the 5th district
- In office March 20, 1867 – January 4, 1869
- Preceded by: Jackson Hadley
- Succeeded by: William Pitt Lynde

Member of the Wisconsin State Assembly from the Milwaukee 7th district
- In office January 6, 1873 – January 5, 1874
- Preceded by: Winfield Smith
- Succeeded by: Francis H. West

Member of the Wisconsin State Assembly from the Milwaukee 1st district
- In office January 6, 1862 – January 5, 1863
- Preceded by: Robert Haney
- Succeeded by: John Sharpstein
- In office January 2, 1860 – January 7, 1861
- Preceded by: Edwin Palmer
- Succeeded by: Robert Haney

Member of the Wisconsin State Assembly from the Milwaukee 6th district
- In office January 3, 1853 – January 2, 1854
- Preceded by: Valentine Knoll
- Succeeded by: Edward O'Neill

Personal details
- Born: Henry Lynde Palmer; October 18, 1819 Mount Pleasant, Pennsylvania, U.S.
- Died: May 6, 1909 (aged 89) Milwaukee, Wisconsin, U.S.
- Resting place: Forest Home Cemetery, Milwaukee, Wisconsin
- Party: Democratic
- Spouses: Mary Loveland (m. 1843; died 1854) Mary Jane Hayes (m. 1857–1909)
- Children: with Mary Loveland; Jessie (Kasson)^{(b. 1844; died 1909)}; Horace Loveland Palmer^{(b. 1849; died 1889)}; Frank T. Palmer^{(b. 1853; died 1898)}; with Mary Jane Hayes; Grace Palmer^{(b. 1860)}; Charles Harvey Palmer^{(b. 1865; died 1954)}; Mary Palmer^{(b. 1866)}; Gertrude Palmer^{(b. 1872; died 1872)}
- Parents: Thaddeus Palmer (father); Martha (Tracy) Palmer (mother)
- Profession: Lawyer, politician

Henry Lynde "Harry" Palmer (October 18, 1819 – May 6, 1909) was an American lawyer, businessman, and Democratic politician. He was a major contributor to the economic development of the city of Milwaukee, Wisconsin, and was largely responsible for growing the Northwestern Mutual Life Insurance Company from a small Janesville firm into a major Midwest insurance conglomerate; Palmer served as president of the company from 1874 to 1908, and was responsible for moving the headquarters to Milwaukee.

Before his business success, Palmer served as the 6th speaker of the Wisconsin State Assembly (1853), and was a member of the Assembly for four terms. He also served in the Wisconsin Senate for two sessions, and was the Democratic nominee for governor of Wisconsin in the 1863 election. In civic life, he was also extremely influential in American Freemasonry, and was sovereign grand commander of the U.S. Northern Masonic Jurisdiction from 1879 until his death in 1909.

== Biography ==
Palmer was born on October 18, 1819, in Mount Pleasant, Pennsylvania, to Thaddeus and Martha Palmer. He later moved to New York City and became a lawyer. In 1849, he moved to Wisconsin, settling in Milwaukee, and began practicing law. Palmer became President of Wisconsin Mutual Life Insurance Company in 1874. During his tenure, the company moved to Milwaukee from Janesville, Wisconsin, and was renamed the Northwestern Mutual Life Insurance Company. Palmer died on May 6, 1909.

== Freemasonry ==
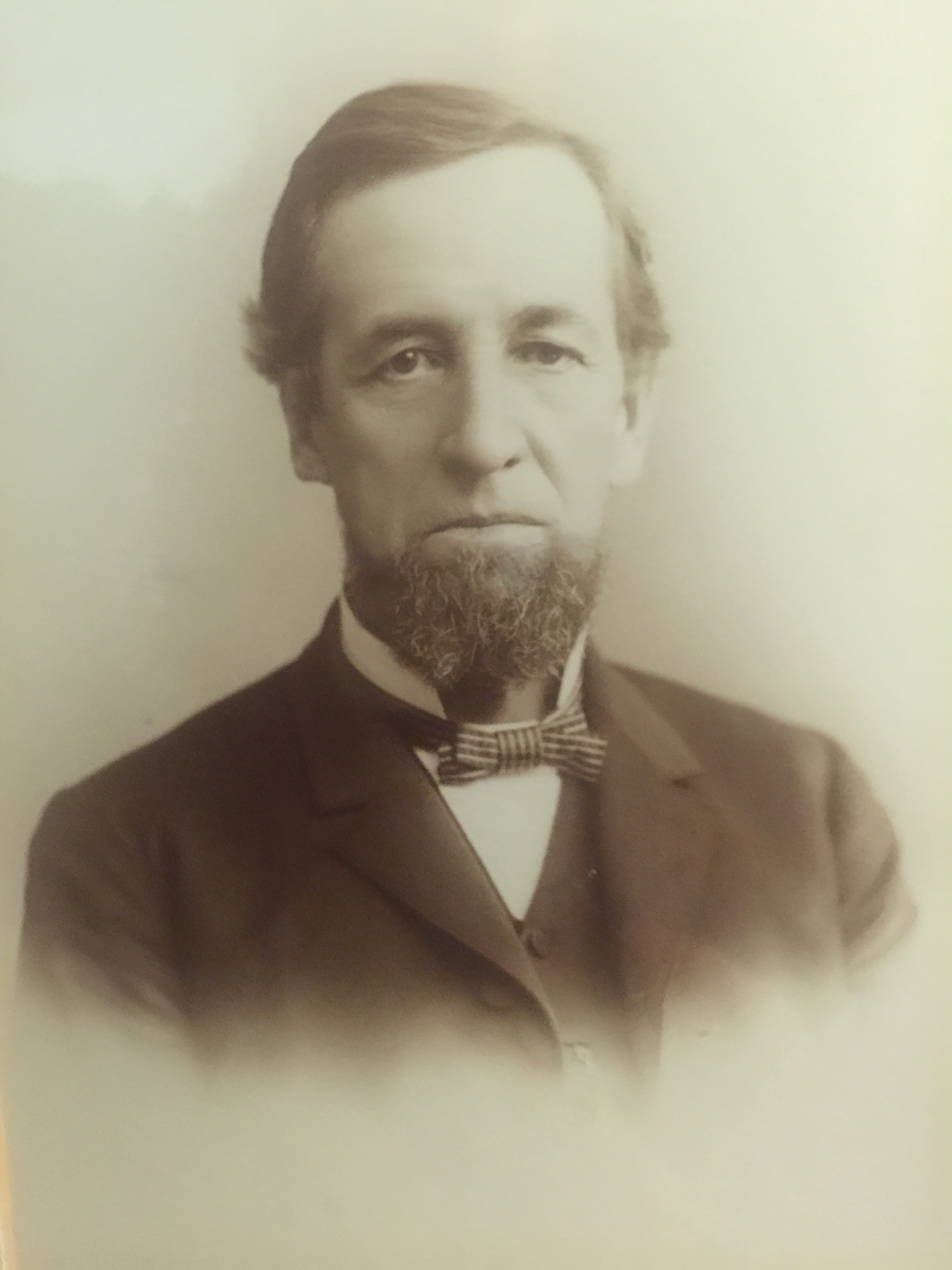
Palmer was the Worshipful Master of Wisconsin Lodge #13 F&AM in 1851, 1852, 1857, 1858, 1865 and 1867.

Palmer was an active member of Wisconsin Lodge #13. He led his lodge as Worshipful Master in 1851, 1852, 1857, 1858, 1865 and 1867. After his passing, Henry L. Palmer #301 Lodge, founded in 1911, was named in his honor.

Henry L. Palmer Lodge #301 located in Wauwatosa, Wisconsin, continues to be a vibrant lodge place today.

Palmer was very active in the Scottish Rite in the Valley of Milwaukee Scottish Rite building located in downtown Milwaukee next to Northwestern Mutual Life Insurance Company.

Most significantly, he was elected as the leader of the Northern Masonic Jurisdiction, serving as Sovereign Grand Commander from 1879 to 1909. Under his leadership, the Northern Masonic Jurisdiction was incorporated by the Massachusetts Legislature. In addition, membership in the organization increased from approximately 7,000 to 61,000.

== Political career ==
Palmer was a member of the Assembly for four terms and a member of the Senate from 1867 to 1868, elected in a special election after the death of Senator Jackson Hadley. In 1863, he was a candidate for Governor of Wisconsin, losing to James Taylor Lewis. Palmer was later a probate court judge for Milwaukee County from 1873 to 1874. He was a Democrat.

== Electoral history ==
=== Wisconsin Lieutenant Governor (1859) ===
Wisconsin Lieutenant Gubernatorial Election, 1859
| Party | Candidate | Votes | % | ±% |
|---|---|---|---|---|
General Election, November 8, 1859
| Republican | Butler Noble | 63,147 | 51.24% | +1.32pp |
| Democratic | Henry L. Palmer | 60,093 | 48.76% | −1.28pp |
| Plurality | | 3,054 | 2.48% | +2.36pp |
| Total votes | | 123,240 | 100.00% | +38.66% |
| Republican gain from Democratic | | | | |

Party political offices
| Preceded by Benjamin Ferguson | Democratic nominee for Governor of Wisconsin; 1863 | Succeeded by Harrison Carroll Hobart |
Wisconsin State Assembly
| Preceded by Valentine Knoll | Member of the Wisconsin State Assembly from the Milwaukee 6th district January 3, 1853 – January 2, 1854 | Succeeded by Edward O'Neill |
| Preceded by Edwin Palmer | Member of the Wisconsin State Assembly from the Milwaukee 1st district January 2, 1860 – January 7, 1861 | Succeeded by Robert Haney |
| Preceded by Robert Haney | Member of the Wisconsin State Assembly from the Milwaukee 1st district January 6, 1862 – January 5, 1863 | Succeeded by John Sharpstein |
| Preceded by Winfield Smith | Member of the Wisconsin State Assembly from the Milwaukee 7th district January 6, 1873 – January 5, 1874 | Succeeded by Francis H. West |
| Preceded by James McMillan Shafter | Speaker of the Wisconsin State Assembly; January 3, 1853 – January 2, 1854 | Succeeded by Frederick W. Horn |
Wisconsin Senate
| Preceded by Jackson Hadley | Member of the Wisconsin Senate from the 5th district March 20, 1867 – January 4, 1869 | Succeeded by William Pitt Lynde |
