= Paul Bechtner =

American politician

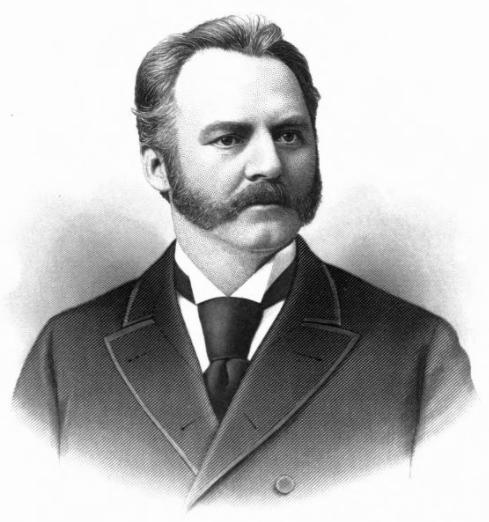

Member of the Wisconsin Senate from the 5th district
- In office January 1891 – January 1895
- Preceded by: Theodore Fritz
- Succeeded by: William H. Austin

Personal details
- Born: December 19, 1847 Stuttgart, Kingdom of Württemberg
- Died: February 12, 1914 (aged 66) Milwaukee, Wisconsin
- Party: Republican
- Occupation: Newspaper editor, manufacturer, politician

Paul Bechtner (December 19, 1847 – February 12, 1914) was an American newspaper editor, manufacturer, and politician.

== Biography ==
Paul Bechtner was born in Stuttgart, Kingdom of Württemberg on December 19, 1847. He emigrated to the United States in 1848, and settled in Milwaukee, Wisconsin in 1868. Bechtner was the publisher of Abendpost, a German-language newspaper. He was a manufacturer and manager of the Exposition Building in Milwaukee.

In 1878, Bechtner was elected school commissioner and, in 1884, was elected president of the school board. In 1884, he was president of the Milwaukee County Insane Asylum Board of Trustees. In 1886, Bechtner served on the Milwaukee Common Council. A Republican, he served in the Wisconsin Senate from 1891 to 1895. He unsuccessfully ran for mayor of Milwaukee in 1892.

Bechtner died at his daughter's house in Milwaukee on February 12, 1914, after a long illness.
