= Bloomingburg Reformed Protestant Dutch Church =

Historic church in New York, United States

- Bloomingburg Reformed; Protestant Dutch Church
- U.S. National Register of Historic Places
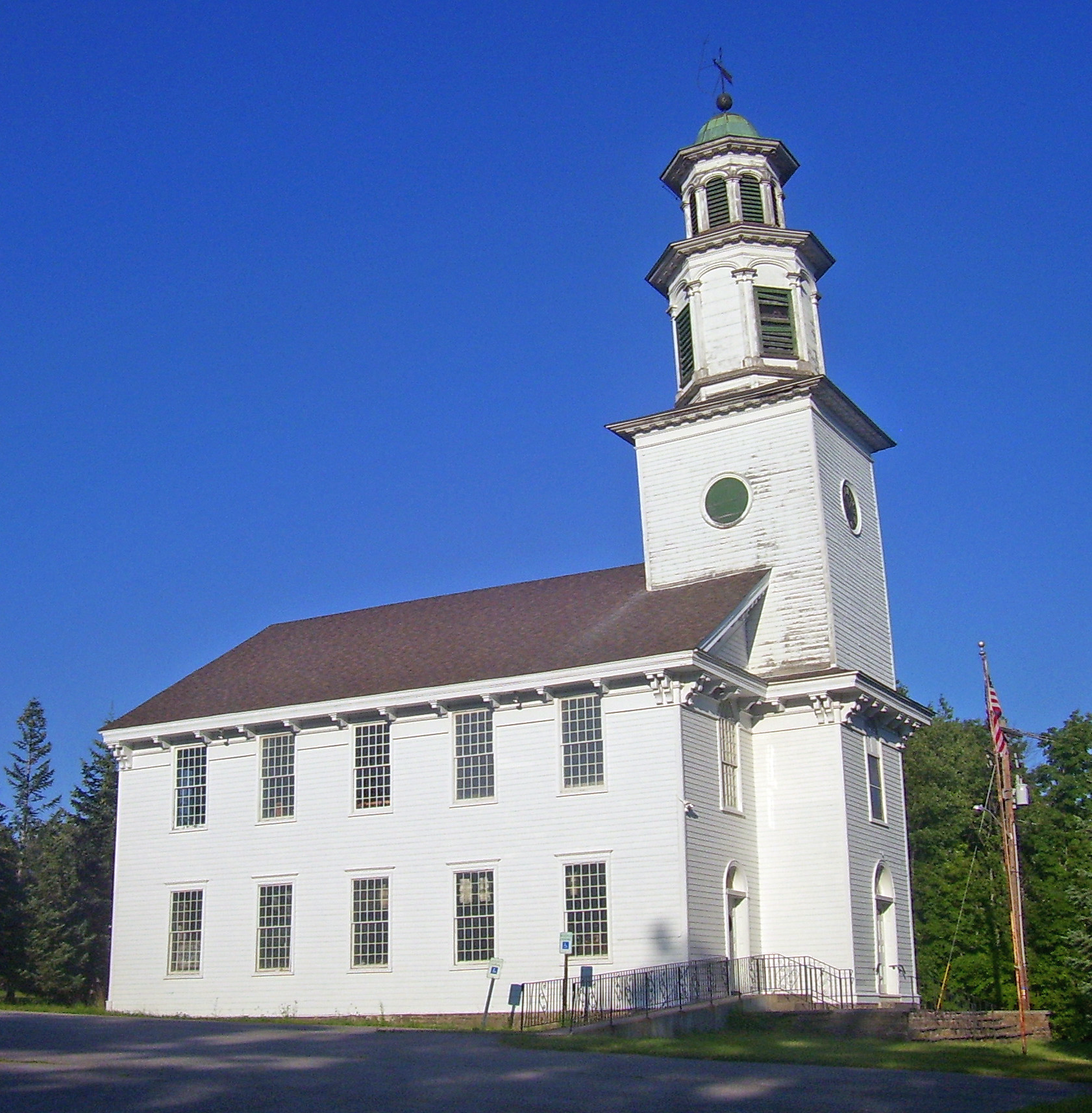
- Front (south) elevation and west profile, 2008
- Location: Bloomingburg, NY
- Nearest city: Middletown
- Coordinates: 41°33′21″N 74°26′34″W
- Area: 1.5 acres (6,100 m^{2})
- Built: 1821
- Architect: Peter Weller and George Miller
- Architectural style: Federal
- NRHP reference No.: 80002779
- Added to NRHP: January 10, 1980

The former Bloomingburg Reformed Protestant Dutch Church is located on Main Street (Sullivan County Route 171) in Bloomingburg, New York, United States. An ornate wooden Federal style building dating to 1821, it is one of the oldest churches in the county. It remains mostly as it was originally built save for some changes to the interior.

Its 80-foot-tall (24 m) bell tower visible for some distance, is a local landmark. In 1980 the church, no longer in use, was listed on the National Register of Historic Places. It is currently a local and regional history museum. A recent referendum defeated a proposal by the town of Mamakating to sell it to another congregation.

== Building ==
The church building is a two-story, three-by-five-bay rectangle sided in white clapboard. The heavy timber framing is supported by a fieldstone foundation. The moderately-pitched gabled roof is shingled in asphalt, with a single chimney near the roofline on the east side. The church is entered at the tower or south end. Unusually, this originally brought the congregation in at the sides of the altar, which was also at this end.

From the projecting central front bay, the multi-staged tower rises, interrupted only by the bracketed cornice on the front roofline. It continues to a narrow frieze with cornice and modillions. All four sides have a window, a small roundel on the front and sides and a small rectangle on the rear, overlooking the roof. Above the oculus there has traditionally been a painted clock face, set at 11:07.

The belfry above is octagonal and ornate. Tuscan columns frame panels that are alternately louvered and plain. These support a similar frieze and cornice as the one below. The final stage uses the same treatment, with all panels louvered, and the tower's cap is an octagonal dome with weathervane.

All the three front bays are filled with entrances. The main entrance is a pair of doors recessed behind fluted architraves. A fanlight surmounts the doorway, their muntins making intersecting Gothic arches. These are echoed on the side entrances.

Both sides are fully fenestrated on both stories with 20-over-20 double-hung sash windows. The rear elevation features no decorative treatment at the roofline, and one window in each story at the sides, similar to the windows along the sides.

A vestibule separates the main door from the sanctuary, while both side entrances lead directly to it. The altar is of plain wood, with some elliptical framing in the wall above paralleling a larger frame opposite that leads to the stairway to the choir loft, supported by thin octagonal columns. Simple round columns support the 10-foot–deep (3 m) second-story galleries with balustrade on either side. All walls except the front have wainscoting to the sill level; the front has shelving.

All the woodwork inside save the altar and gallery handrails is painted white. Much of it is original. The ceilings are pressed metal.

A set of stone steps from the front leads to a flagstone walkway that in turn descends a set of steep stone steps to Main Street. In the back is a small bungalow that once served as a parsonage.

== Aesthetics ==
The Bloomingburg Reformed Protestant Dutch Church is similar to the style of churches that began to appear in New England after 1800, as well as some of Charles Bulfinch's designs. It was common to copy church designs at the time, usually from other nearby examples. The steeple appears to be some similarity between the Bloomingburg church and a pattern for a rural church in Asher Benjamin's influential 1797 The Country Builder's Assistant.

But unlike the other designs, there is no small pediment on the front of the tower, matching the larger pediment on the front face, nor is there any sign there ever was. The three-bay front is a variant found more frequently in New York, as opposed to the five-bay facades found in New England. Also unusual is the placement of the altar at the front of the church, later changed.

== History ==
The Associate Reformed Church was formed in Bloomingburg in 1799. Twenty years later, in 1819, some members who wished for a pastor recognized by the Dutch Reformed Church broke away to form the Reformed Protestant Dutch Church of Bloomingburgh (as it was then spelled). They chose the small Gillen's Hill, which overlooked the village, and established a building committee.

The cornerstone was laid in 1821. Church records credit Peter Weller, an elder of the church and George Miller, a local builder and carpenter who was not a member of the congregation, with the construction. A year later, the pews were finished and subscribed. The church was dedicated in spring 1822 and opened in December.

At the time, the church interior was slightly different. The altar was at the entrance end, and a small semicircular window in the gable apex opened into the rear. These were changed in the middle of the century, along with the conversion of the box pews into slips, the extension of the galleries and construction of the choir loft and accompanying stairways. A new bell was installed in 1868.

In the late 1880s, the exterior got renovated. The roof eaves were extended and the brackets installed, per the late Italianate trends of the era. A memorial stained-glass window was installed in 1901 above the front door. Other stained-glass windows installed shortly afterwards have since been lost. New carpets and pews were installed later in that decade.

To celebrate the church's centennial, in 1922 the parsonage was built. In 1950 the roof was converted from tin to asphalt shingling, the last major change to the church's exterior. A decade later, in 1962, the dwindling congregation merged with Bloomingburg's Methodist Church to form the Community Church of Bloomingburg. The old Reformed Church building was for a time used as a church school, but then a new educational wing was added to the Community Church building, and the old church was sold to the county.

It was neglected for a few years, with some of the interior furnishings stolen and vandalized. In 1977 the Bloomingburg Restoration Foundation was established to preserve the church and use it as a regional history museum; it is open today for that purpose by appointment. In 1999 the county transferred the church to the Town of Mamakating.

In 2017 the town offered to sell the church to a parish that was temporarily holding church services in the building. At the time the building was being rented by the Bloomingburg Restoration Foundation who paid the town $1 a year to rent the property in exchange for its continued service to the building and the community. The parish declined, and later the town notified the foundation that it was planning to sell the church to a Pentecostal congregation from nearby Middletown for $85,000, and thus the foundation should vacate the premises. Town supervisor Bill Herrmann claimed the foundation's maintenance of the property "has been less than acceptable", citing numerous defects in the building such as cracks in the interior plaster, a leaning steeple and front steps in such disrepair that they are blocked off from use, requiring visitors to enter through the side. The foundation countered that it had invested $50,000 in the building during its ownership, adding carpeting and a bathroom and a new furnace. It said it would hire a lawyer to fight any eviction proceedings, and suggested the town's real goal was to sell it to the area's growing Hasidic community, an allegation Hermann called a sign of the foundation's desperation.

No legal action would be necessary. In 2018 the Bloomingburg Restoration Foundation collected enough signatures on a petition to force a permissive referendum on the sale. By an overwhelming margin the sale of the building was rejected.

== See also ==
- National Register of Historic Places listings in Sullivan County, New York
