= Bloomingburg, New York =

- Village
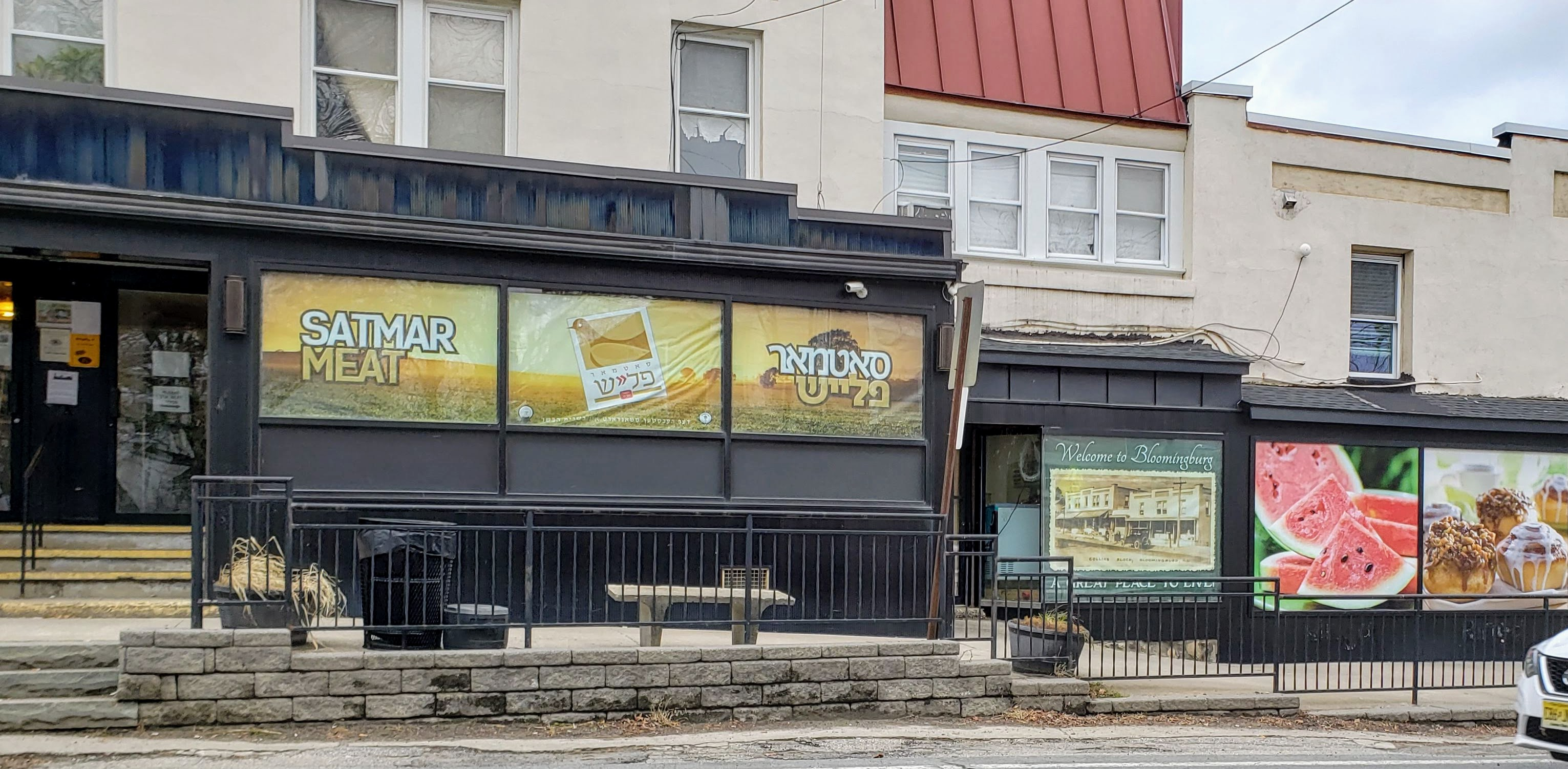
- Storefronts on Main Street

- Location of Bloomingburg within Sullivan and Orange County, New York

- Location within New York Location within the United States
- Coordinates: 41°33′N 74°26′W
- Country: United States
- State: New York
- County: Sullivan
- Founded: 1833

Area
  - Total: 0.69 sq mi (1.78 km^{2})
  - Land: 0.69 sq mi (1.78 km^{2})
  - Water: 0 sq mi (0.00 km^{2})
- Elevation: 515 ft (157 m)

Population (2020)
  - Total: 1,032 ▲
  - Density: 1,499.5/sq mi (578.97/km^{2})
- Time zone: UTC−5 (Eastern (EST))
  - Summer (DST): UTC−4 (EDT)
- ZIP Code: 12721
- Area code: 845
- FIPS code: 36-06959
- GNIS feature ID: 0975768
- Website: bloomingburgny.gov

Bloomingburg, previously Bloomingburgh, is a village in the Sullivan County town of Mamakating, New York, United States. The population was 1,032 at the 2020 census.

The village has a notable Hasidic community.

== History ==
Bloomingburg's accepted incorporation date is 1833. It was the first county seat of Sullivan County, being located in the original county town of Mamakating. It prospered, first, as a center of commerce along the Newburgh–Cochecton Turnpike, then as a railway town serving vacationers in the mountains. Many guesthouses in the village were not rebuilt after the devastating fire of February 1922, and the village has been primarily an agricultural center ever since.

Beginning in the late 2000s and intensifying during the 2010s, Bloomingburg became the site of a controversial residential development intended primarily for Hasidic Jewish families. A large townhouse project known as Chestnut Ridge significantly increased the village’s population and led to prolonged legal and political disputes between long-time residents, local officials, developers, and new residents. These disputes included lawsuits alleging religious discrimination, challenges to voter registrations, and efforts to dissolve the village government.

In 2016, Bloomingburg and the Town of Mamakating settled a federal civil rights lawsuit brought by the project’s developer, agreeing to pay $2.9 million without admitting wrongdoing. Separately, Hasidic residents settled a voting rights lawsuit against the Sullivan County Board of Elections, resulting in election monitoring and policy changes.

Federal prosecutors later uncovered a voter fraud scheme connected to the 2014 village election. In 2017, developer Shalom Lamm and two associates pleaded guilty to conspiracy to commit voter fraud after admitting they had falsely registered non-residents to vote in Bloomingburg. Lamm was and both co-conspirators each served under 1 year in prison, while the bloomingburg community and residents were impacted forever. Despite the controversy, the Hasidic community continued to grow in the village, and Bloomingburg experienced substantial population growth by the end of the decade.

The Bloomingburg Reformed Protestant Dutch Church was listed on the National Register of Historic Places in 1980.

== Geography ==
Bloomingburg is located at 41°33′22″N 74°26′28″W (41.556159, −74.441060). The village's eastern boundary is the Shawangunk Kill, Dutch for "Shawangunk River", also the Orange County line at that point, with its western boundary a short distance up the Shawangunk Ridge. It is the only population center in Sullivan County entirely within the Hudson River watershed.

The northern and southern boundaries roughly parallel Main Street, also County Route 171, the former route of NY 17, which now bypasses the village to the north as an expressway. It is served by two exits on Route 17, one for Burlingham Road and the other, just over the county line, for NY 17K.

According to the United States Census Bureau, the village has a total area of 0.3 square miles (0.78 km^{2}), all land.

== Demographics ==
Historical population
Census	Pop.	Note	%±
1930	215		—
1940	197		−8.4%
1950	263		33.5%
1960	303		15.2%
1970	323		6.6%
1980	338		4.6%
1990	316		−6.5%
2000	353		11.7%
2010	420		19.0%
2020	1,032		145.7%
U.S. Decennial Census

Year	People	White (non-hispanic)		Black (nh)		Asian		Other (nh)		Multiracial (nh)		Hispanic/Latino (any race)	
Year	People	Number	%	Number	%	Number	%	Number	%	Number	%	Number	%
2000	353	308	87.2	6	1.7	6	1.7	2	0.5	3	0.8	28	7.9
2010	420	327	77.9	19	4.5	4	1.0	0	0	14	3.3	56	13.3
2020	1,032	885	85.8	14	1.3	6	0.6	5	0.5	48	4.7	74	7.2

As of the 2020 Census, the population has grown to 1,032 people. The most reported ancestries in the village were English (5.7%), German (5.4%), Hungarian (3.6%), and Irish (2.4%).

As of the 2010 census Bloomingburg had a population of 420. 77.9% of the population was non-Hispanic whites, 4.5% non-Hispanic African American, 0.5% Native American, 1.0% Asian, 5.7% reporting two or more races and 13.3% Hispanic or Latino.

As of the census of 2000, there were 353 people, 146 households, and 94 families residing in the village. The population density was 1,113.7 inhabitants per square mile (430.0/km^{2}). There were 181 housing units at an average density of 571.0 per square mile (220.5/km^{2}). The racial makeup of the village was 92.92% white, 2.83% African American, 1.98% Asian, 0.57% from other races, and 1.70% from two or more races. Hispanic or Latino of any race were 7.93% of the population.

There were 146 households, out of which 35.6% had children under the age of 18 living with them, 50.0% were married couples living together, 11.6% had a female householder with no husband present, and 35.6% were non-families. 29.5% of all households were made up of individuals, and 10.3% had someone living alone who was 65 years of age or older. The average household size was 2.42 and the average family size was 3.04.

In the village, the population was spread out, with 27.8% under the age of 18, 9.3% from 18 to 24, 34.8% from 25 to 44, 16.1% from 45 to 64, and 11.9% who were 65 years of age or older. The median age was 32 years. For every 100 females, there were 90.8 males. For every 100 females age 18 and over, there were 90.3 males.

The median income for a household in the village was $38,571, and the median income for a family was $41,111. Males had a median income of $35,938 versus $21,750 for females. The per capita income for the village was $21,441. About 17.0% of families and 11.1% of the population were below the poverty line, including 17.7% of those under age 18 and 8.7% of those age 65 or over.

== Notable persons ==
- Edward M. Hunter, Wisconsin state senator and lawyer, was born in Bloomingburg.

== See also ==
- Kaser, New York
- Kiryas Joel, New York
- New Square, New York
- Williamsburg, Brooklyn
- Lakewood Township, New Jersey
