= 1863 Wisconsin gubernatorial election =

- November 3, 1863
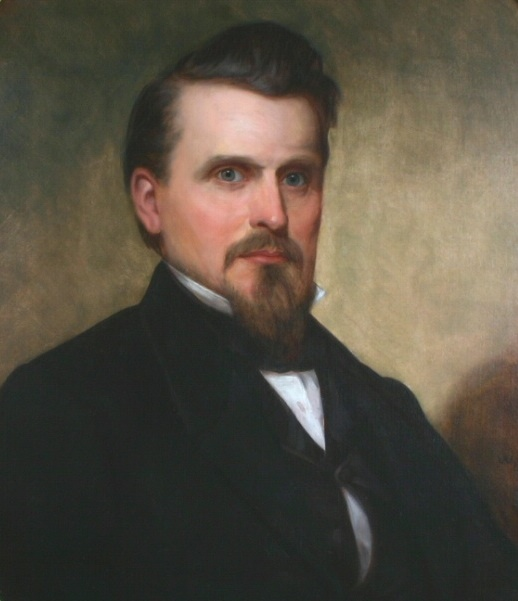

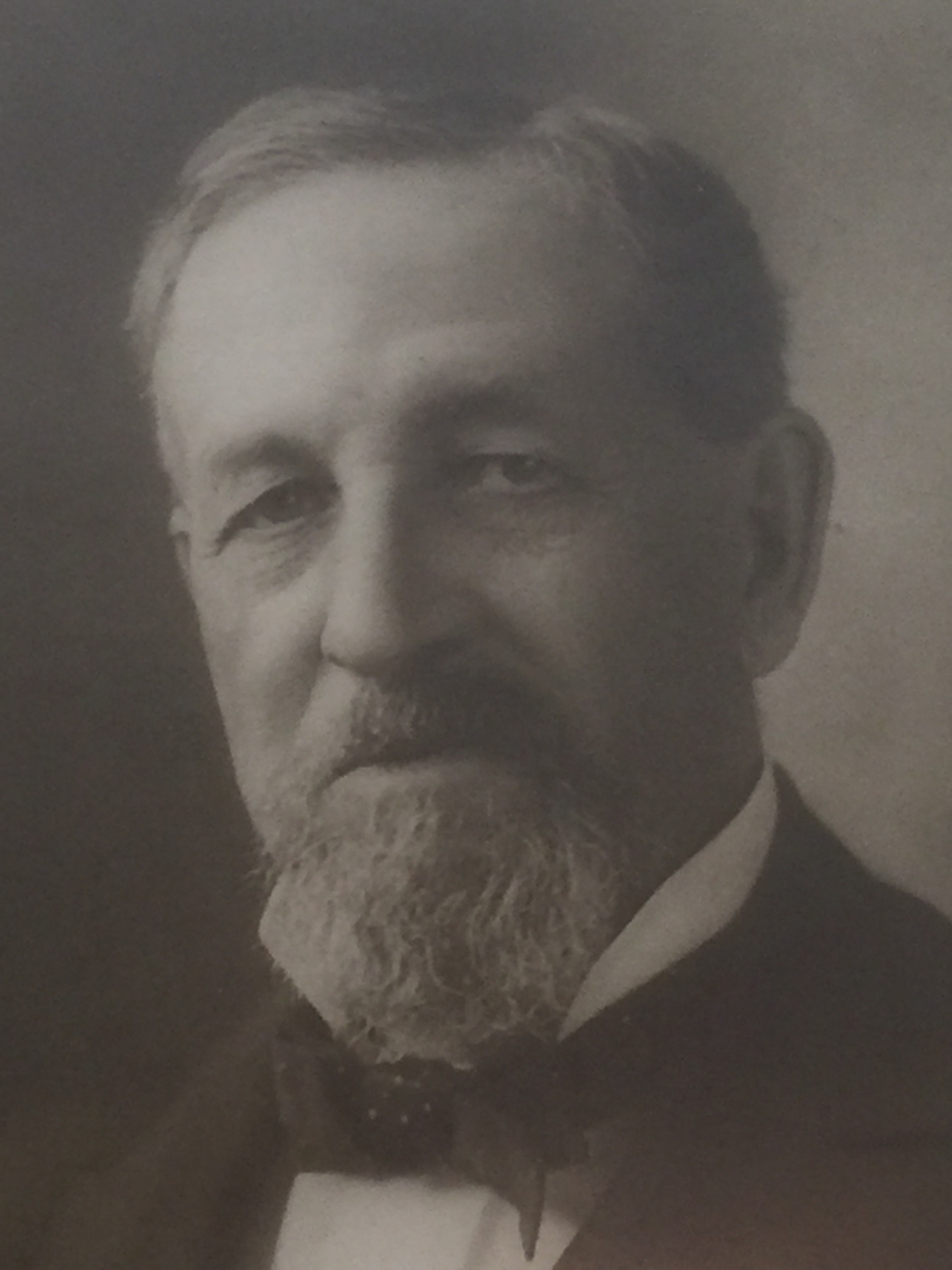
Nominee	James T. Lewis	Henry L. Palmer
Party	National Union	Democratic
Popular vote	72,717	49,053
Percentage	59.59%	40.20%
- County results Lewis: 50–60% 60–70% 70–80% 80–90% Palmer: 50–60% 60–70% 70–80% 80–90%
Governor before election
Edward Salomon
National Union
Elected Governor
James T. Lewis
National Union

The 1863 Wisconsin gubernatorial election was held on November 3, 1863. Union candidate James T. Lewis won the election with nearly 60% of the vote, defeating Democratic candidate Henry L. Palmer.

The incumbent Governor, Edward Salomon, had ascended to office after the accidental drowning of his predecessor, Louis P. Harvey, in April 1862. He was a former Democrat who had been elected Lieutenant Governor on the Union ticket in 1861. He was not re-nominated.

== Nominations ==
=== Union party ===
James T. Lewis was the incumbent Wisconsin Secretary of State at the time of the 1863 election, having been elected on the Union ticket in the 1861 election. Lewis was also a former Democrat. As a Democrat, he had previously served as Lieutenant Governor of Wisconsin from 1854 to 1856, and represented Columbia County in the state legislature for two years—in the Assembly for the 1852 session, and in the Senate for the 1853 session.

=== Democratic party ===
Henry L. Palmer was a former Speaker of the Wisconsin State Assembly, and had served three terms in the Assembly and one term in the Wisconsin State Senate prior to the 1863 election.

== Results ==
1863 Wisconsin gubernatorial election
Party	Candidate	Votes	%	±%
National Union	James T. Lewis	72,717	59.59%	+5.41%
Democratic	Henry L. Palmer	49,053	40.20%	−5.60%
Independent	Edward Salomon (write-in)	227	0.19%	
	Scattering	32	0.03%	
Majority		23,664	19.39%	
Total votes		122,029	100.00%	
National Union hold		Swing	+11.01%	

=== Results by county ===
County	James T. Lewis Union		Henry L. Palmer Democratic		Margin		Total votes cast
County	#	%	#	%	#	%	Total votes cast
Adams	692	75.79%	221	24.21%	471	51.59%	913
Ashland	32	51.61%	30	48.39%	2	3.23%	62
Brown	543	33.81%	1,062	66.13%	-519	-32.32%	1,606 (Note: Includes 1 Scattering vote)
Buffalo	548	68.16%	255	31.72%	293	36.44%	804
Calumet	557	44.07%	707	55.93%	-150	-11.87%	1,264
Chippewa	226	45.38%	272	54.62%	-46	-9.24%	498
Clark	106	70.20%	45	29.80%	61	40.40%	151
Columbia	2,896	69.65%	1,262	30.35%	1,634	39.30%	4,158
Crawford	712	51.67%	666	48.33%	46	3.34%	1,378
Dane	4,152	53.52%	3,598	46.38%	554	7.14%	7,758 (Note: Includes 8 Scattering votes)
Dodge (Note: This county's return was rejected by the Board of Canvassers due to lacking an official seal. These votes are not included in the statewide totals.)	3,677	46.88%	4,166	53.12%	-489	-6.23%	7,843
Door	230	82.44%	49	17.56%	181	64.87%	279
Douglas	48	40.34%	71	59.66%	-23	-19.33%	119
Dunn	507	65.00%	273	35.00%	234	30.00%	780
Eau Claire	501	62.70%	298	37.30%	203	25.41%	799
Fond du Lac	3,579	57.30%	2,667	42.70%	912	14.60%	6,246
Grant	3,404	72.16%	1,313	27.84%	2,091	44.33%	4,717
Green	2,046	70.99%	836	29.01%	1,210	41.98%	2,882
Green Lake	1,499	77.59%	433	22.41%	1,066	55.18%	1,932
Iowa	1,351	51.82%	1,256	48.18%	95	3.64%	2,607
Jackson	559	73.26%	204	26.74%	355	46.53%	763
Jefferson	2,299	48.53%	2,438	51.47%	-139	-2.93%	4,737
Juneau	893	57.10%	671	42.90%	222	14.19%	1,564
Kenosha	1,328	67.76%	632	32.24%	696	35.51%	1,960
Kewaunee	143	23.87%	456	76.13%	-313	-52.25%	599
La Crosse	1,299	64.28%	717	35.48%	582	28.80%	2,021 (Note: Includes 5 Scattering votes)
La Pointe	43	78.18%	12	21.82%	31	56.36%	55
Lafayette	1,483	50.34%	1,463	49.66%	20	0.68%	2,946
Manitowoc	1,302	40.05%	1,949	59.95%	-647	-19.90%	3,251
Marathon	107	21.02%	402	78.98%	-295	-57.96%	509
Marquette	594	46.19%	692	53.81%	-98	-7.62%	1,286
Milwaukee	3,170	35.24%	5,815	64.64%	-2,645	-29.40%	8,996 (Note: Includes 11 votes for Salomon)
Monroe	1,113	66.53%	560	33.47%	553	33.05%	1,673
Oconto	326	85.56%	55	14.44%	271	71.13%	381
Outagamie	737	42.09%	1,014	57.91%	-277	-15.82%	1,751
Ozaukee	279	13.93%	1,724	86.07%	-1,445	-72.14%	2,003
Pepin	295	75.45%	96	24.55%	199	50.90%	391
Pierce	597	66.70%	298	33.30%	299	33.41%	895
Polk	198	70.21%	84	29.79%	114	40.43%	282
Portage	790	71.49%	315	28.51%	475	42.99%	1,105
Racine	2,156	60.54%	1,405	39.46%	751	21.09%	3,561
Richland	1,135	64.42%	627	35.58%	508	28.83%	1,762
Rock	4,053	74.68%	1,368	25.21%	2,685	49.47%	5,427 (Note: Includes 4 votes for Salomon and 2 Scattering votes)
Sauk	2,061	67.33%	854	27.90%	1,207	39.43%	3,061 (Note: Includes 146 votes for Salomon)
Shawano	138	56.10%	108	43.90%	30	12.20%	246
Sheboygan (Note: This county's canvass was declared to be illegal by the Board of Canvassers. These votes are not included in the statewide totals.)	2,076	53.23%	1,824	46.77%	252	6.46%	3,900
St. Croix	594	54.65%	493	45.35%	101	9.29%	1,087
Trempealeau	517	85.88%	85	14.12%	432	71.76%	602
Vernon	1,155	76.24%	360	23.76%	795	52.48%	1,515
Walworth	3,511	78.14%	981	21.83%	2,530	56.31%	4,493
Washington	659	21.14%	2,453	78.70%	-1,794	-57.56%	3,117
Waukesha	2,386	50.99%	2,293	49.01%	93	1.99%	4,679
Waupaca	1,222	73.57%	438	26.37%	784	47.20%	1,661
Waushara	1,098	79.45%	284	20.55%	814	58.90%	1,382
Winnebago	2,796	64.72%	1,524	35.28%	1,272	29.44%	4,320
Wood	284	46.48%	327	53.52%	-43	-7.04%	611
Soldiers (Note: The rejected Soldier vote was 1,464 for Lewis, 156 for Palmer, and 32 Scattering.)	7,768	92.65%	542	6.46%	7,226	86.19%	8,384 (Note: Includes 66 votes for Salomon and 8 Scattering votes)
Total	72,717	59.59%	49,053	40.20%	23,664	19.39%	122,029

==== Counties that flipped from Democratic to National Union ====
- Ashland
- Crawford
- Lafayette
- Waukesha

==== Counties that flipped from National Union to Democratic ====
- Calumet
- Douglas
- Kewaunee
