= Charles Quentin =

19th century American politician

Member of the Wisconsin Senate from the 5th district
- In office January 7, 1861 – May 9, 1862
- Preceded by: Cicero Comstock
- Succeeded by: Francis Huebschmann

Personal details
- Born: c.1810 Kingdom of Prussia
- Died: May 9, 1862 (aged 51–52) Milwaukee, Wisconsin, U.S.
- Resting place: Forest Home Cemetery, Milwaukee
- Party: Democratic

Charles Quentin (c.1810 – May 9, 1862) was a German American immigrant, businessman, and Democratic politician. He represented northern Milwaukee County in the Wisconsin State Senate and died in office.

== Biography ==
Charles Quentin was born in the Kingdom of Prussia in 1810 or 1811. He was educated as a lawyer and served the Prussian government as a commissioner in Russia, England, and France. He was a delegate from Prussia to the World's expositions in London and Paris.

After the March Revolution, which saw the Prussian Army massacre hundreds of protesters, Quentin quit the service of the Prussian government and emigrated to the United States. He visited several northwestern states before finally choosing to settle at Milwaukee in 1851.

At Milwaukee, Quentin worked as a real estate dealer under the firm name Charles Quentin & Co. He had frequent dealing with the Milwaukee City Council, and became involved with the Democratic Party of Wisconsin, which was the dominant party in the city. In 1860, he was elected to the Wisconsin State Senate from the 5th Senate district, which then comprised the north half of Milwaukee County.

During his term, he was appointed to a special state commission to restructure Milwaukee's debt. The American Civil War began during his Senate term, and he served as a member of the local committee to raise funds for the support of the families of Milwaukee's Union Army volunteers. He served in the State Senate through the 14th Wisconsin Legislature and the first regular session of the 15th Wisconsin Legislature, but died in May 1862, before the June session and the September special session.

Wisconsin Senate
Preceded by Cicero Comstock	Member of the Wisconsin Senate from the 5th district January 7, 1861 – May 9, 1862	Succeeded by Francis Huebschmann
