= Charles Cassius Rogers =

American politician

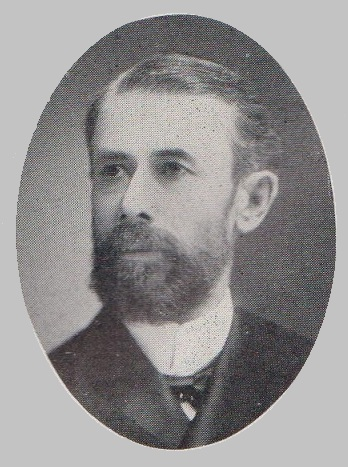

Member of the Wisconsin Senate from the 5th district
- In office 1902–1907
- Succeeded by: Edward T. Fairchild

Personal details
- Born: December 15, 1849 Cambridge, Maine
- Died: May 11, 1937 (aged 87) Milwaukee, Wisconsin
- Party: Republican

Charles Cassius Rogers (1849–1937) was a member of the Wisconsin State Senate.

== Biography ==
Rogers was born on December 15, 1849, in Cambridge, Maine, and was educated at Bisbie Military Academy in Poughkeepsie, New York. He was a professor of mathematics at Eastman College, and president of the Association for Advancement of Milwaukee. He was also a member of the Milwaukee Chamber of Commerce. He died on May 11, 1937, after a fall.

== Political career ==
Rogers was a Republican. He was elected to the Wisconsin Senate in 1902, receiving 7,380 votes against 5,739 votes cast for A. Huebschmann (a Democrat), and 1,758 votes cast for Vie Peterson.
