= Robert Haney =

American politician

Robert Haney (June 8, 1809 – January 7, 1885) was an American politician and businessman.

Haney was born in Batavia, New York to a Dutch family, and attended the city's Boys' Academy. He worked as a hardware merchant from 1839 to 1850. In 1848, Haney went into partnership with John De Bow to open a store in Milwaukee, Wisconsin. Haney remained in Batavia until a disastrous fire in February 1850 persuaded him to move permanently to Milwaukee with his family.

Haney operated a retail and wholesale hardware store in Milwaukee until the end of his life. He began in 1848 on the corner of present-day Wisconsin Avenue and Water Street, and moved in 1849 to present-day Plankinton Avenue. A fire again destroyed Haney's store on August 24, 1854, but he rebuilt and business recovered. In 1866, the Milwaukee Sentinel ranked him as one of the forty-eight most prosperous men in Milwaukee.

A contemporary book written on the history of Milwaukee describes Haney in the following manner:

He is a man of marked peculiarities of character. In person he is above the medium height is well formed very muscular and when in his prime must have been a very powerful man He is possessed of an excellent constitution and although well up to 70 years of age is remarkably active. He is fond of horse back riding and takes exercise that way daily In his business he is very methodical wants his own way and will have it someway. He is always exceedingly "close mouthed," not easy to get acquainted with, and has to day fewer intimate acquaintances than any other business man in the city. He is strictly temperate and requires the same of all his employes

— James Smith Buck

Haney was elected to the Wisconsin State Assembly for the 1861 term as a Democrat.
