= John B. Smith (Wisconsin politician) =

American politician

John B. Smith was a member of the Wisconsin State Senate from 1849 to 1850 representing the 19th district. He was a Democrat.

Born in Old Town, Massachusetts (later Maine) on September 11, 1811, he moved to Milwaukee, Wisconsin Territory and was in the lumber business. He was also in the railroad business and helped edited the Free Democrat newspaper. He died on January 3, 1879, in Milwaukee, Wisconsin.
