= Henry Otto Reinnoldt =

American politician

Henry Otto Reinnoldt was a member of the Wisconsin State Assembly.

== Biography ==
Reinnoldt was born on August 23, 1865, in Sheboygan, Wisconsin. He attended the University of the Sciences and was in the retail drug business. He died at his home in Milwaukee, Wisconsin, on December 22, 1941.

== Career ==
Reinnoldt was elected to the Assembly in 1896. He was a Republican. In 1917, Reinnoldt also served in the Wisconsin State Senate.
