= William H. Austin =

American politician and lawyer (1859–1922)

Member of the Wisconsin State Senate
- In office 1895–1899

Member of the Wisconsin State Assembly
- In office 1893–1893

Personal details
- Born: October 22, 1859 Binghamton, New York, U.S.
- Died: October 15, 1922 (aged 62) Milwaukee, Wisconsin, U.S.
- Party: Republican
- Occupation: Politician; lawyer

William Harvey Austin (October 22, 1859 – October 15, 1922) was an American politician and lawyer.

Born in Binghamton, New York, Austin moved to Portage, Wisconsin, in 1869 and then permanently settled in Milwaukee, Wisconsin, in 1871. He went to the Milwaukee public schools. Austin studied law and was admitted to the Wisconsin bar in 1879. He served as counsel for the Wisconsin Brewers' Association and the United States Brewers' Association. Austin served as assistant district attorney for Milwaukee County, Wisconsin and as school commissioner. He also served as assistant city attorney and city attorney for the City of Milwaukee. In 1893, Austin served in the Wisconsin State Assembly and was a Republican. Then from 1895 to 1899, Austin served in the Wisconsin State Senate. Austin died at his home in Milwaukee from stomach trouble.
