= George J. Weigle =

American politician

George J. Weigle (4 December 1871 in Milwaukee, Wisconsin – 28 April 1956) was a member of the Wisconsin State Senate.

== Career ==
Weigle was a member of the Senate from 1911 to 1914. He was a Republican.
