= Edward M. Hunter =

American politician

Edward M. Hunter (February 19, 1826 – September 13, 1878) was an American politician and lawyer.

Born in Bloomingburg, New York, Hunter studied law in New York City. In 1849, he started practicing law in Milwaukee, Wisconsin. In 1853 and 1854, Hunter served in the Wisconsin State Senate. He also served as United States Courts commissioner and Milwaukee County Circuit Court commissioner. Hunter was also the private secretary to Wisconsin Governor William A. Barstow. Hunter died in Milwaukee, Wisconsin.
