= Augustus Greulich =

American politician

Augustus Greulich was a member of the Wisconsin State Assembly and the Wisconsin State Senate.

== Biography ==
Greulich was born in the Grand Duchy of Baden, Germany in 1813. He moved to the United States in 1834 and settled in Milwaukee, Wisconsin in 1840. Greulich died in 1893.

== Career ==
Greulich was a member of the Milwaukee City Council from 1848 to 1849 and member of the State Assembly in 1848 and 1856. From 1857 to 1858, he was a member of the Senate. He was a Democrat.
