= William K. Wilson =

American politician (c. 1817 – 1898)

William K. Wilson (c. 1817, Hamilton, Scotland – 26 December 1898, Wauwatosa, Wisconsin) was an American harness merchant who served as a member of the Wisconsin State Assembly and the Wisconsin State Senate. Wilson was a member of the Assembly in 1851 and of the Senate from 1863 to 1866. He was a Democrat.
