= Burnett, Wisconsin =

- Town
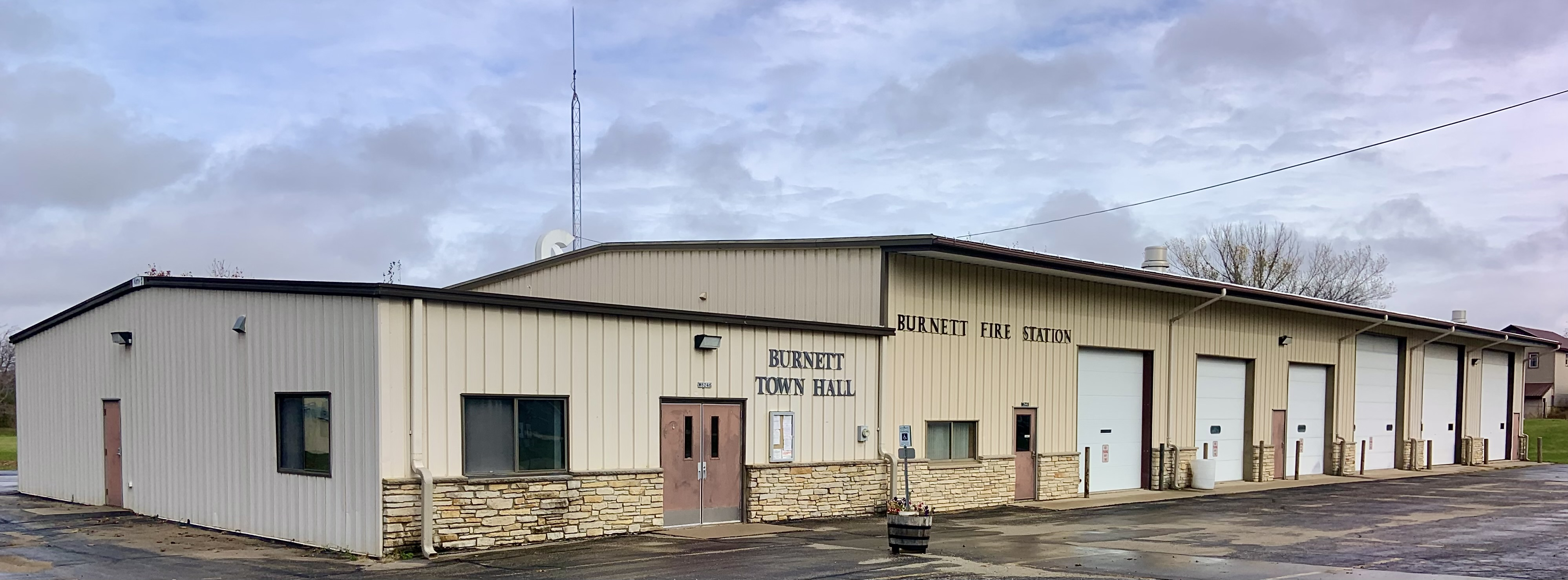
- Town hall

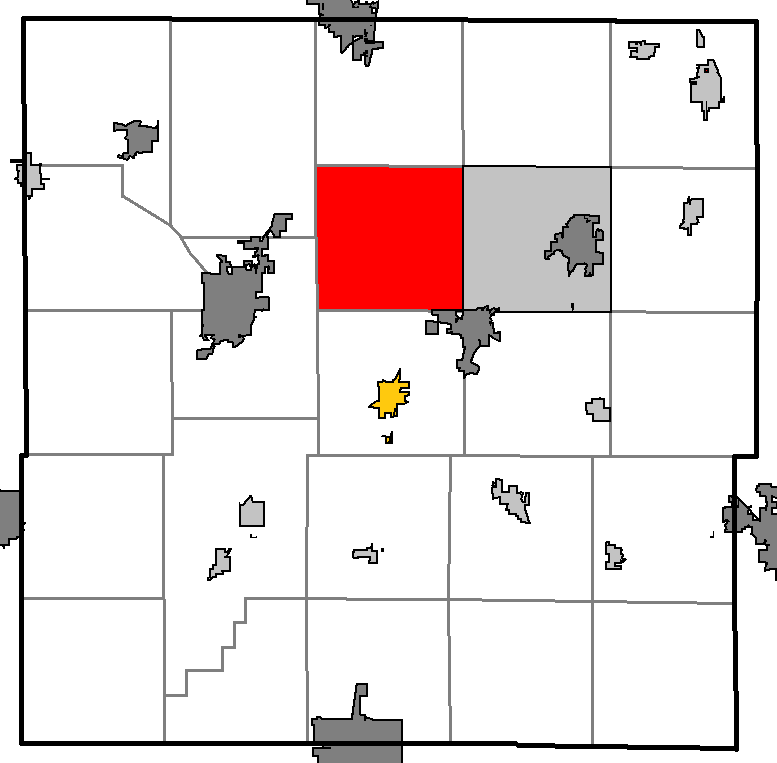
- Location of Burnett, within Dodge County
- Coordinates: 43°30′15″N 88°42′38″W
- Country: United States
- State: Wisconsin
- County: Dodge

Area
  - Total: 36.4 sq mi (94.4 km^{2})
  - Land: 36.2 sq mi (93.7 km^{2})
  - Water: 0.27 sq mi (0.7 km^{2})
- Elevation: 869 ft (265 m)

Population (2020)
  - Total: 831
  - Density: 23.0/sq mi (8.87/km^{2})
- Time zone: UTC-6 (Central (CST))
  - Summer (DST): UTC-5 (CDT)
- FIPS code: 55-11275
- GNIS feature ID: 1582890
- Website: http://www.townofburnett.com

Burnett is a town in Dodge County, Wisconsin, United States. The population was 831 at the 2020 census. The census-designated place of Burnett is located in the town, and the unincorporated community of Rolling Prairie is located partially within the town.

== History ==
The town was named for Ellsworth Burnett(e), a government surveyor who was killed by Indians in November 1835.

== Geography ==
According to the United States Census Bureau, the town has a total area of 36.5 square miles (95 km^{2}), of which 36.2 square miles (94 km^{2}) is land and 0.3 square miles (0.78 km^{2}) (0.74%) is water.

== Demographics ==
As of the census of 2000, there were 919 people, 330 households, and 265 families residing in the town. The population density was 25.4 people per square mile (9.8 people/km^{2}). There were 353 housing units at an average density of 9.8 per square mile (3.8/km^{2}). The racial makeup of the town was 98.59% White, 0.33% African American, 0.65% from other races, and 0.44% from two or more races. Hispanic or Latino of any race were 0.87% of the population.

There were 330 households, out of which 34.2% had children under the age of 18 living with them, 70.9% were married couples living together, 4.5% had a female householder with no husband present, and 19.4% were non-families. 17.0% of all households were made up of individuals, and 8.5% had someone living alone who was 65 years of age or older. The average household size was 2.78 and the average family size was 3.14.

In the town, the population was spread out, with 26.7% under the age of 18, 6.9% from 18 to 24, 28.8% from 25 to 44, 26.1% from 45 to 64, and 11.5% who were 65 years of age or older. The median age was 38 years. For every 100 females, there were 107.9 males. For every 100 females age 18 and over, there were 106.1 males.

The median income for a household in the town was $55,000, and the median income for a family was $59,750. Males had a median income of $35,263 versus $24,875 for females. The per capita income for the town was $22,043. About 4.2% of families and 5.8% of the population were below the poverty line, including 7.5% of those under age 18 and 7.0% of those age 65 or over.

== Notable people ==
- Russ Bogda (1911–1958), businessman and president of the Green Bay Packers Corporation
- Lillian Heath (1865–1962), the first female doctor in Wyoming
- George F. Merrill (1847–1941), Wisconsin state senator
- Fred E. Moul (1878–1955), Wisconsin state representative
- Daniel D. Murphy (1866–1944), farmer, businessman, and Minnesota state senators
- Elmer C. Nitschke (1911–1982), Wisconsin state senator
- Don Peachey (born 1933), Hall of Fame musician and band leader
- Leander H. Shepard (1825–1893), Wisconsin state representative
