= Rawlins High School =

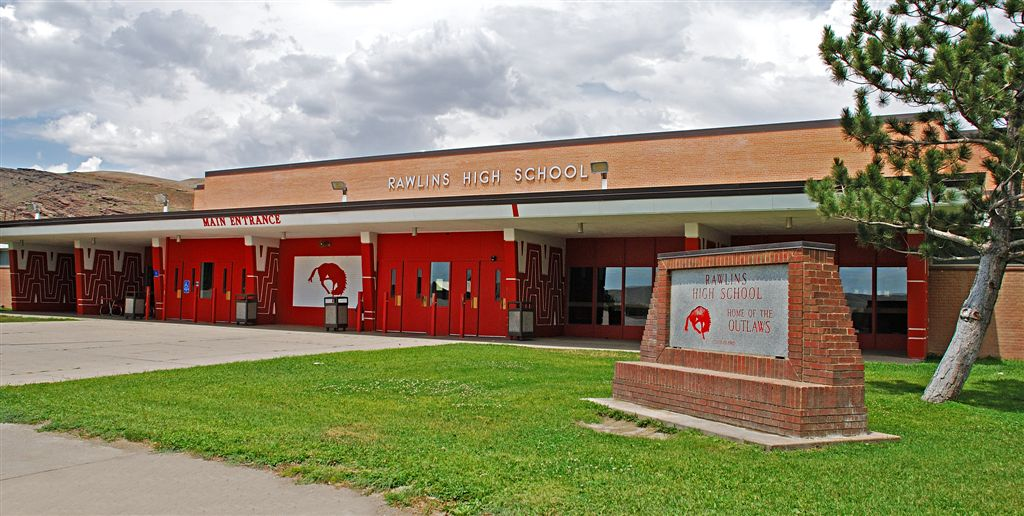
- The main entrance to Rawlins High School

Location
- 1401 Colorado St. Rawlins, Wyoming; United States; 41.803°N 107.228°W

Information
- Grades: 9 to 12
- Enrollment: 414 (2023-2024)
- Colors: Red and white
- Mascot: Mighty Outlaw Horse
- Team name: Rawlins Outlaws
- Website: rhs.crb1.net

Rawlins High School (2015) is a public high school in Rawlins, Wyoming, United States. Rawlins High School is part of Carbon County School District #1.

== Notable alumni ==
- Clarence Addison Brimmer, Jr. (1922-2014), judge of the United States District Court for the District of Wyoming from 1975 to 2013
- Lillian Heath (1865–1962), the first female doctor in Wyoming.
- George R. Salisbury, Jr., Class of 1937; rancher in Carbon County; member of the Wyoming House of Representatives, 1975-1986
- Larry Wilcox (born 1947), actor and star of NBC television show CHiPs
