= Lillian Heath =

American physician

- Born: December 29, 1865; Burnett Junction, Wisconsin
- Died: August 5, 1962 (aged 96); Rawlins, Wyoming
- Education: Graduate of College of Physicians and Surgeons in Keokuk, Iowa
- Years active: 1893 – 1909
- Medical career
- Profession: Nurse, Doctor

Lilian Heath (December 29, 1865 – August 5, 1962) was the first woman physician in the state of Wyoming and one of the first to practice medicine west of the Mississippi River.

She is notorious for having used the top of the skull of outlaw Big Nose George Parrott as a doorstop and pen jar.

== Early life ==
Heath was born in Burnett, Wisconsin, then known as Burnett Junction on December 29, 1865. Her family moved to Aplington, Iowa, and later to Laramie, Wyoming, before moving to Rawlins, Wyoming, where her father got a job as a locomotive painter for the Union Pacific Railroad. Heath arrived in the Wyoming territory when she was eight years old. She observed the solar eclipse of July 29, 1878, along with scientist Henry Draper and inventor Thomas Edison, who had come to Wyoming to conduct experiments and had stayed in the Rawlins House, where the Heaths were living at the time.

Heath graduated from Rawlins High School in 1888.

== Nursing ==
In the early 1880s, Heath's father obtained a job for her as an assistant to Thomas Maghee, a physician employed by the Union Pacific Railroad. Heath would wear men's clothing and carried a gun as protection when she went on her house calls at night. She assisted Maghee, helping treat his patients, including one who had attempted suicide by shooting himself in the chin. Maghee and Heath performed an early example of plastic surgery on the man, recreating a nose from a section of his forehead. While assisting Maghee, she learned how to administer anesthesia, which at first consisted of whiskey but was then followed by chloroform and then ether, which to her was harder to use.

After the March 22, 1881, lynching of infamous outlaw Big Nose George Parrott for the murder of Robert Widdowfield, Heath was a witness at the autopsy performed by Maghee and was given the skull cap that had been sawed off Parrott's head as a souvenir, while other portions of his body were made into a pair of shoes. She used the skull cap as a doorstop. She kept the skull cap for decades and it was positively identified as an exact match in the 1950s after the remainder of Parrott's body was exhumed and examined. The skull cap was put on display at the Union Pacific Railroad Historical Museum in Council Bluffs, Iowa, while the remainder of the skull is on display at the Carbon County Museum in Rawlins.

== Medical career ==
She enrolled in the University of Colorado at Boulder for a year, and then transferred to the College of Physicians and Surgeons in Keokuk, Iowa, where she was one of three women in the entering class of 22 students. Their school year ran from October to March in order to ensure that the cadavers were fresh for students. She graduated from medical school in 1893 at the age of 27 and came back to Rawlins, where she established a medical office in her parents' house at 111 W Cedar Street. One thing Heath noted about her practice was that she received backlash from patients that were women more than from men. One woman even refused to pay for her services once she found out that Heath was a woman herself. She also often had to ride up to forty miles on horseback to treat her patients.

In 1895, she was the only woman to attend the American Medical Association's conference in Denver, Colorado.

On October 24, 1898 at the age of 33, she married Louis J. Nelson of Rawlins, a painter and decorator. Her husband also used the top part of the skull cap, as a tobacco pipe ashtray.

== Retirement and death ==
Heath retired from practicing medicine about 1909. She practiced medicine for 15 years, but kept her license up to date her entire life. After retirement, she worked as a model for Daniels and Fischer department store out of Denver. Also, she moved to Lamar, Colorado, where she ran the Ben-Mar Hotel with her husband until 1911. After that, she moved back to Rawlins, Wyoming. Keeping up with medicine, in 1955, she flew to Denver, Colorado to inspect hospitals.

She died at Rawlins Memorial Hospital on August 5, 1962, of complications of a broken hip caused by a fall.

== Bibliography ==
Notes

References

- Spring, Agnes Wright (1981). Near the greats (1981 ed.). American Traveler Press. ISBN 978-0-939650-31-6. - Total pages: 162
