= Downtown Rawlins Historic District =

Historic district in Wyoming, United States

- U.S. National Register of Historic Places
- U.S. Historic district
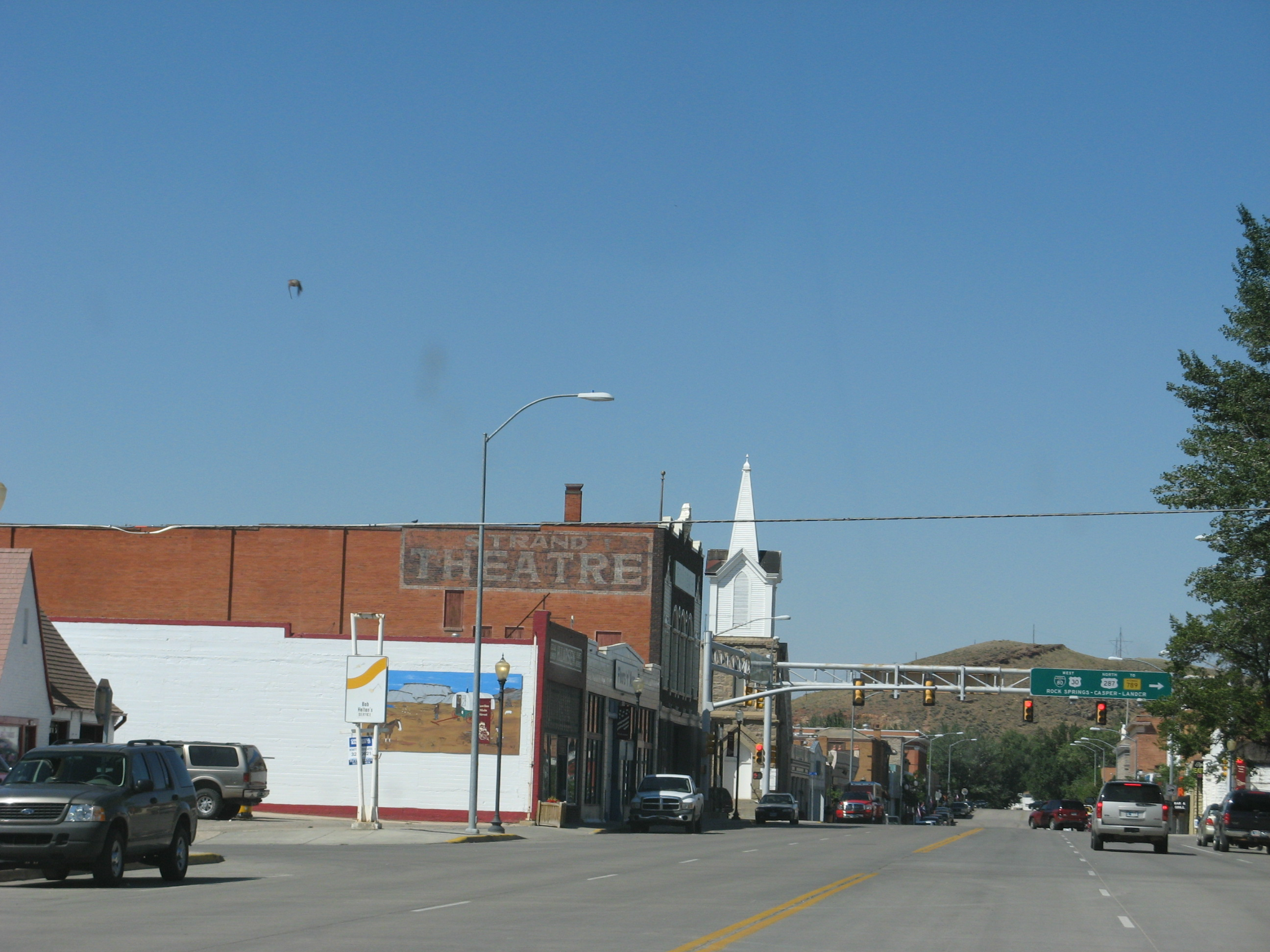
- Downtown Rawlins in 2007

- Location within Wyoming
- Location: Roughly 2nd to 6th Sts. and Front to Buffalo Sts., Rawlins, Wyoming
- Coordinates: 41°47′16″N 107°14′18″W
- Area: 7.8 acres (3.2 ha)
- Built: 1882
- Architect: Multiple
- NRHP reference No.: 85001119
- Added to NRHP: May 16, 1985

The Downtown Rawlins Historic District comprises the historic center of Rawlins, Wyoming. It comprises the area between Second and Sixth Streets and Front to Buffalo Streets and along 5th Street between West Spruce and West Cedar. The town owes much of its living to the Union Pacific Railway, which took advantage of spring in the Rawlins area to establish services there.

Contributing structures on Cedar Street include the H. Larson Hardware Store, the Fox Theatre, the Moose Hall, the Blake House, France Memorial Presbyterian Church and several commercial buildings. Other significant contributing structures include the Daley Building, the Osborne Block, the Miller Block, the Post Office, City Hall and other structures. Most of these buildings were built during a boom time between 1920 and 1930.

The Downtown Rawlins Historic District was listed on the National Register of Historic Places on May 16, 1986.
