= Leander H. Shepard =

19th century American politician

Member of the Wisconsin State Assembly from the Dodge 3rd district
- In office January 1, 1877 – January 7, 1878
- Preceded by: George H. Lawrence
- Succeeded by: Eli Hawks

Personal details
- Born: October 25, 1825 Erie County, New York, U.S.
- Died: July 31, 1893 (aged 67)
- Resting place: Burnett Corners Cemetery, Burnett, Wisconsin
- Party: Republican
- Spouse: Cordelia Mattoon (died 1897)
- Children: Araminta (Erwin); (b. 1858; died 1907); 3 others
- Occupation: Farmer, salesman

Leander H. Shepard (October 25, 1825 – July 31, 1893) was an American farmer and farm machinery salesman. He served one term in the Wisconsin State Assembly, representing Dodge County.

== Biography ==
Shepard was born on October 25, 1825, in Erie County, New York, the son of Amos Shepard (1775–1851) and Chloe Ann Shepard (1789–1863). He later resided in Burnett, Wisconsin, where he was a farmer. Additionally, he sold machinery for the McCormick Harvesting Machine Company. On December 4, 1856, Shepard married Cordelia Mattoon. They had four children. He died on July 31, 1893.

== Political career ==
Shepard was a member of the Assembly during the 1877 session. He was a Republican.
