= Rawlins, Wyoming =

City in the United States

- City
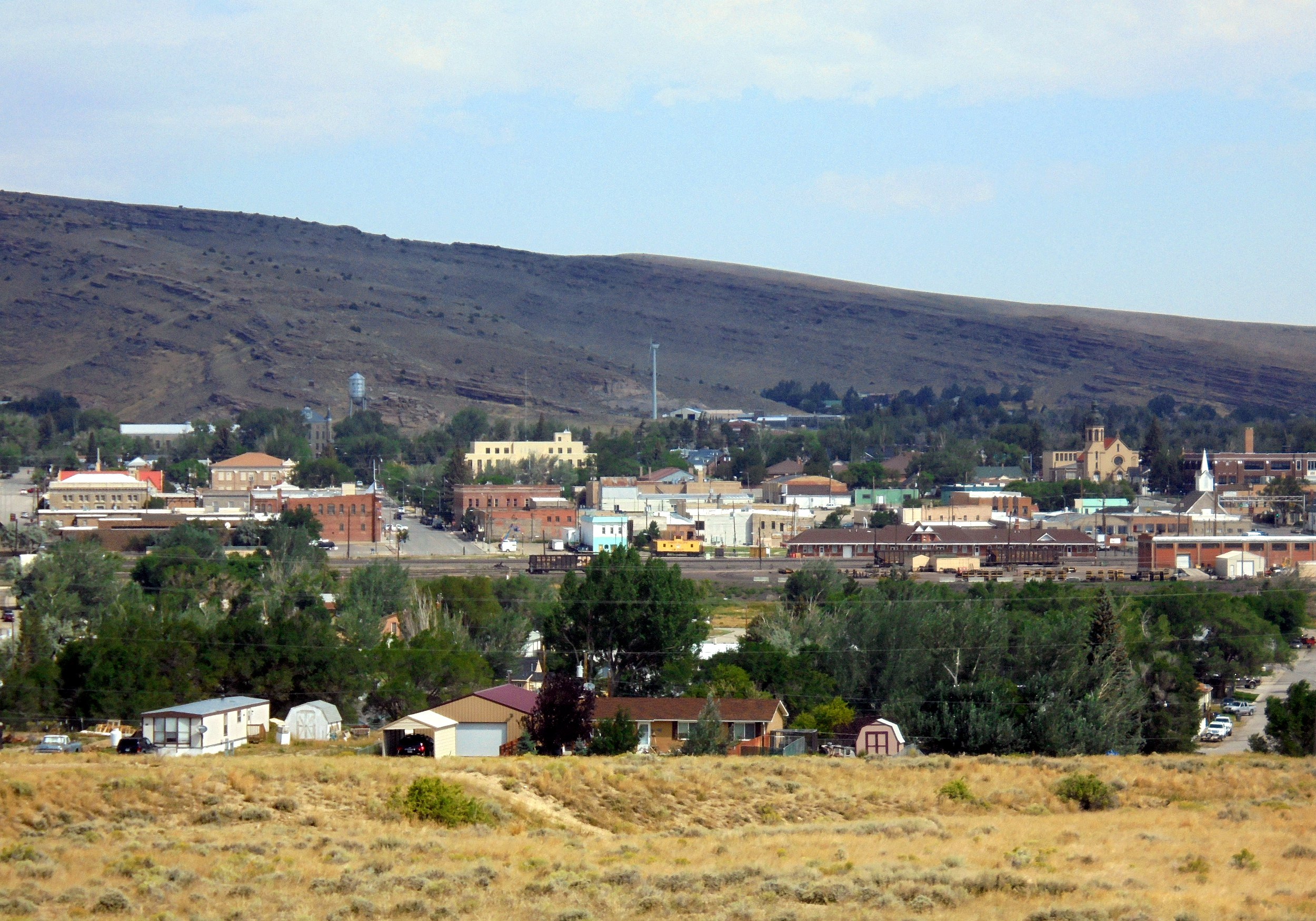
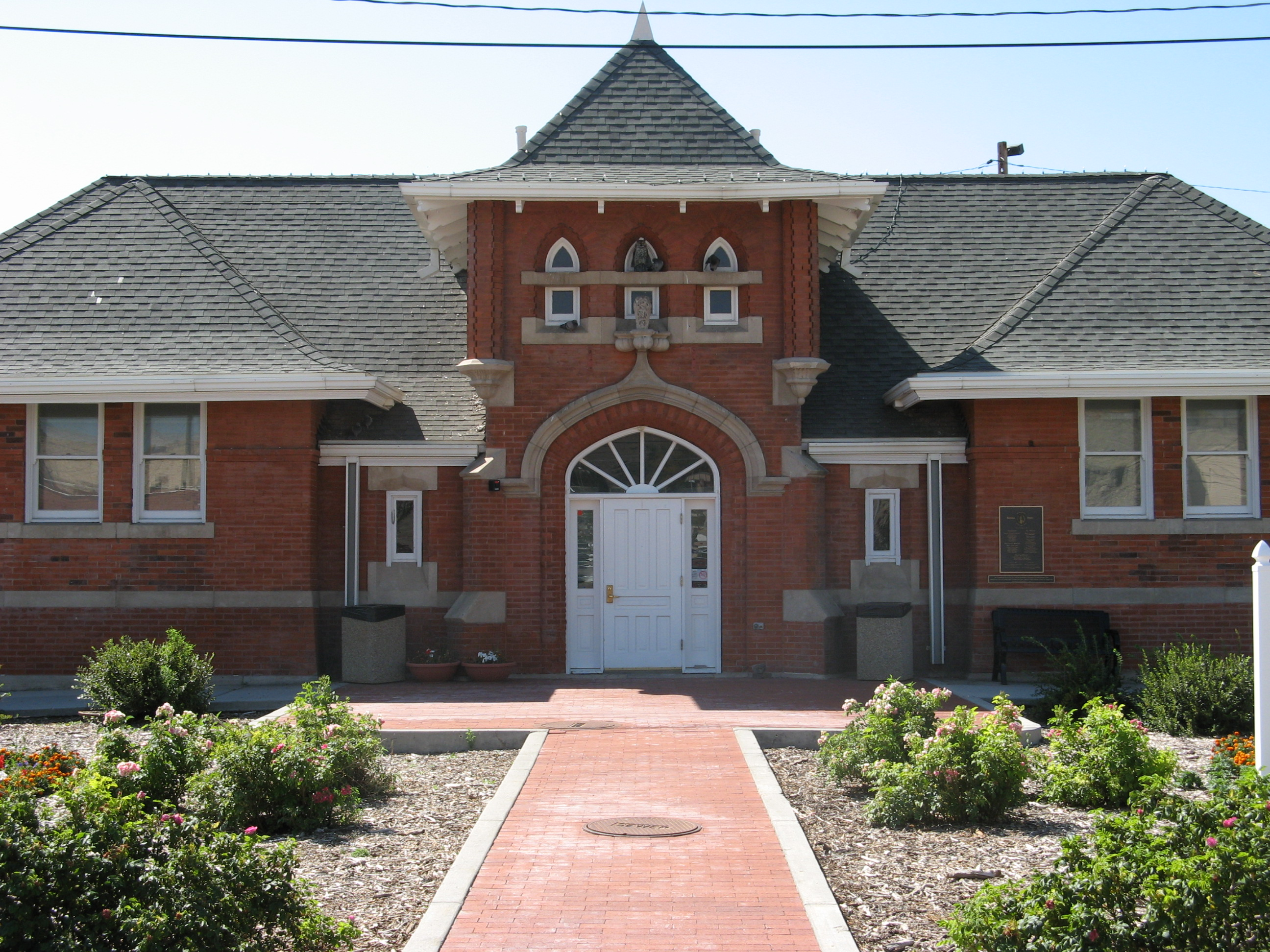
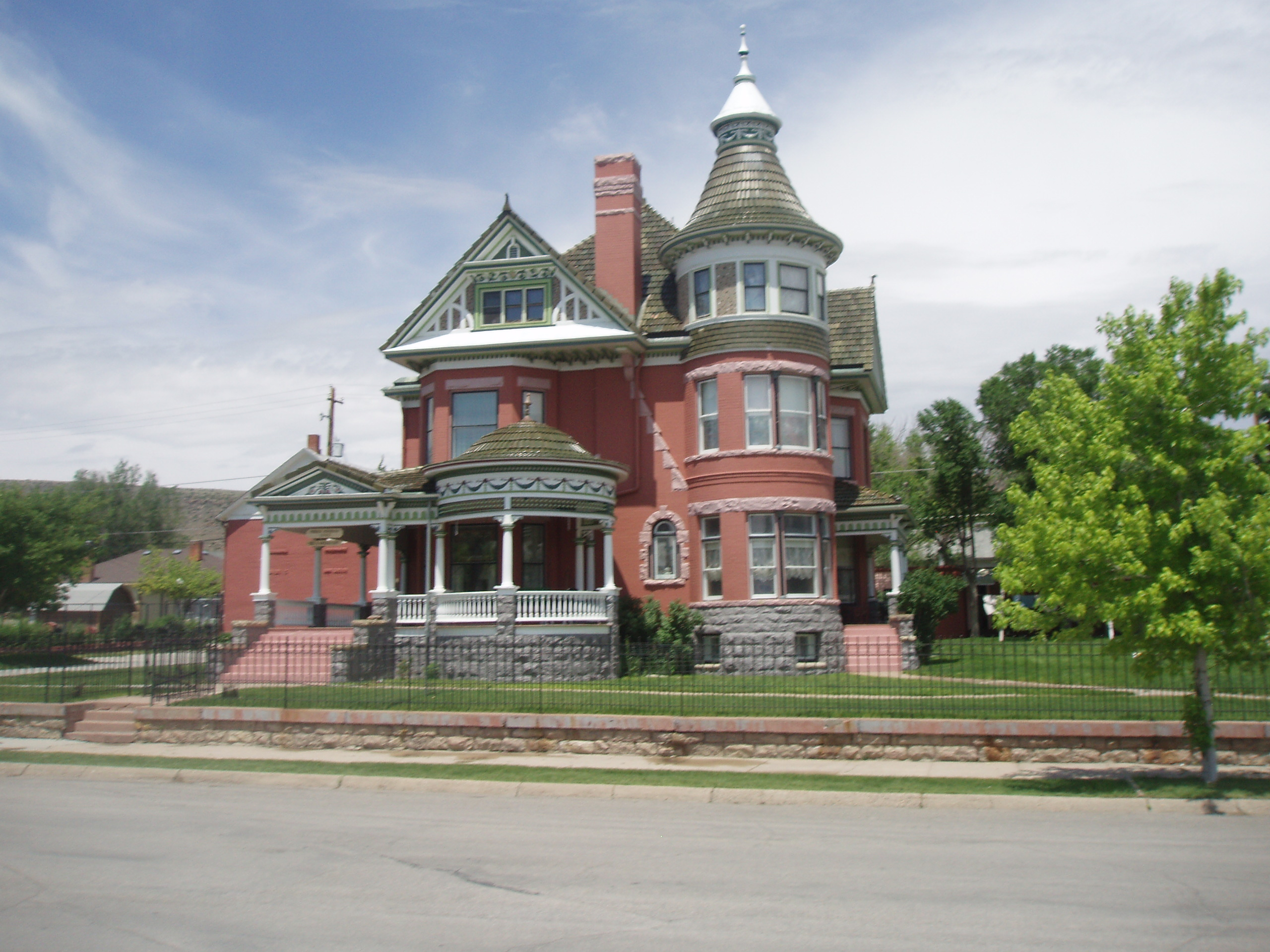
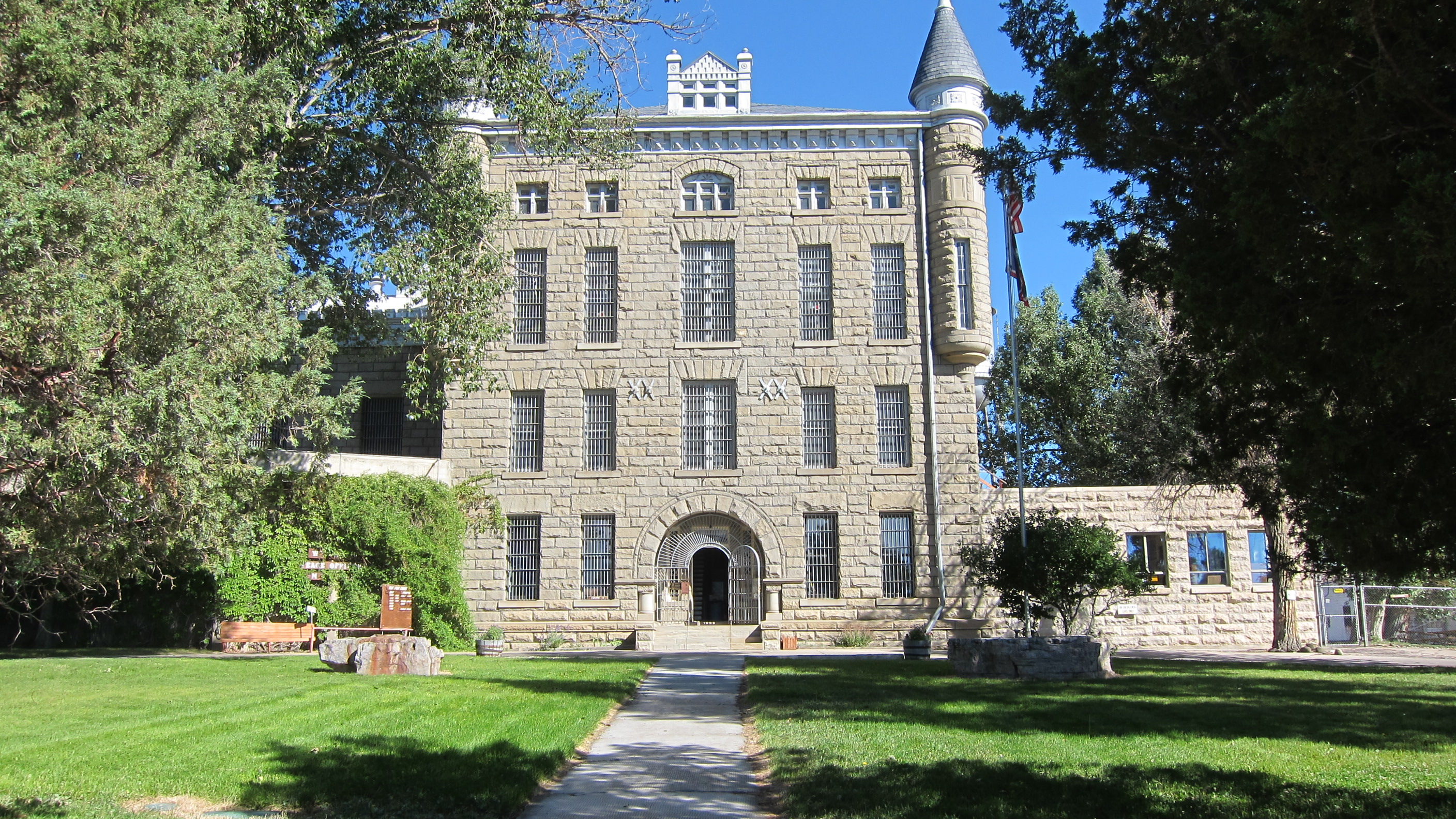
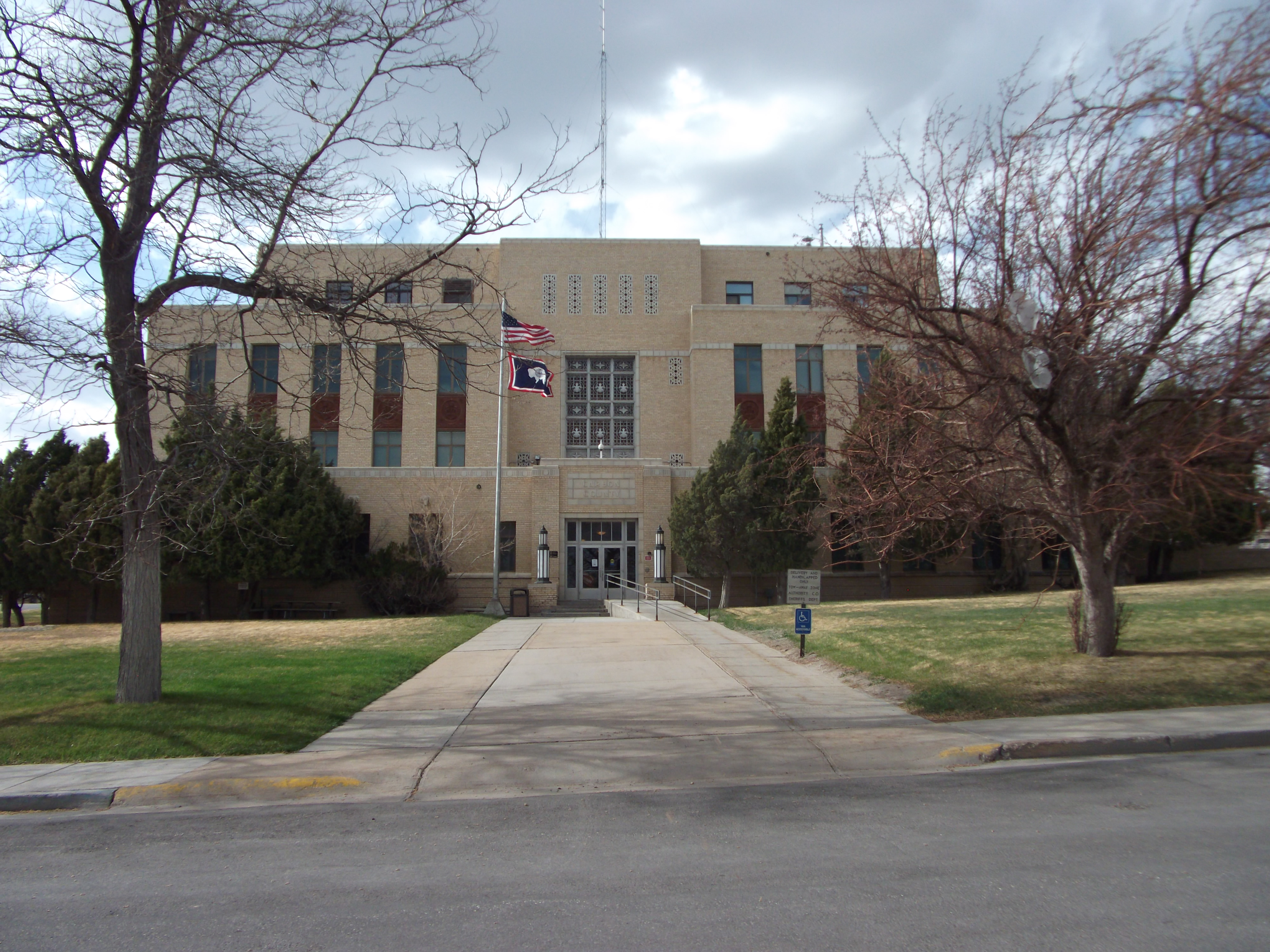
- Downtown Rawlins Rawlins Station George Ferris Mansion Wyoming Frontier Prison Carbon County Courthouse

- Location of Rawlins in Carbon County, Wyoming
- Coordinates: 41°47′08″N 107°14′25″W
- Country: United States
- State: Wyoming
- County: Carbon

Area
  - Total: 8.29 sq mi (21.46 km^{2})
  - Land: 8.25 sq mi (21.36 km^{2})
  - Water: 0.039 sq mi (0.10 km^{2})
- Elevation: 6,834 ft (2,083 m)

Population (2020)
  - Total: 8,221
  - Density: 916/sq mi (353.7/km^{2})
- Time zone: UTC−7 (Mountain (MST))
  - Summer (DST): UTC−6 (MDT)
- ZIP code: 82301
- Area code: 307
- GNIS feature ID: 2411524
- FIPS code: 56-63900
- Website: www.rawlinswy.gov

Rawlins is a city in Carbon County, Wyoming, United States. The population was 8,221 at the 2020 census. It is the county seat of Carbon County. It was named for Union General John Aaron Rawlins, who camped in the locality in 1867.

== Demographics ==
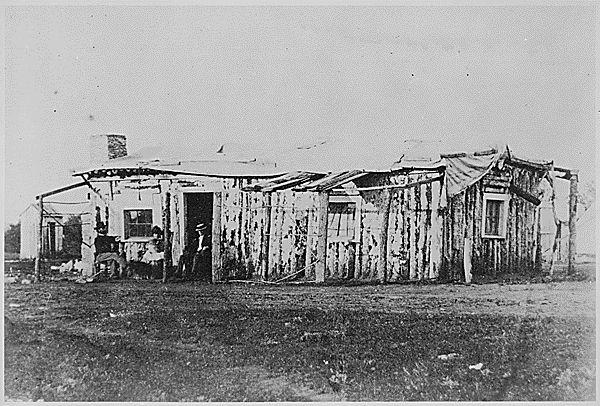
"Officers quarters at Ft. Rawlins, Wyoming, May 7, 1877."

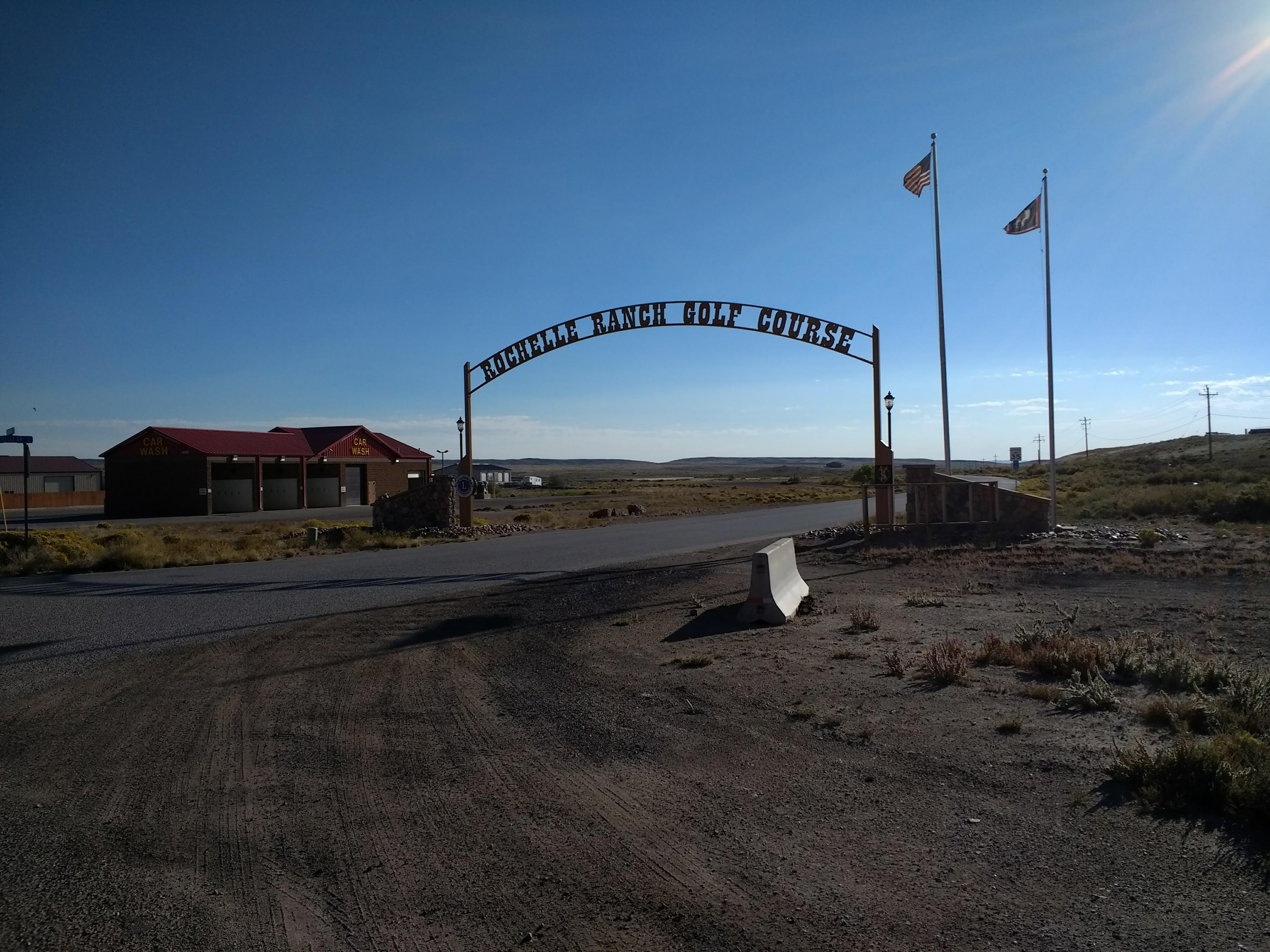
The Rochelle Ranch Golf Course in Rawlins, Wyoming.

Historical population
Census	Pop.	Note	%±
1870	612		—
1880	1,451		137.1%
1890	2,235		54.0%
1900	2,317		3.7%
1910	4,256		83.7%
1920	3,969		−6.7%
1930	4,868		22.7%
1940	5,531		13.6%
1950	7,415		34.1%
1960	8,968		20.9%
1970	7,855		−12.4%
1980	11,547		47.0%
1990	9,380		−18.8%
2000	8,538		−9.0%
2010	9,259		8.4%
2020	8,221		−11.2%
2025 (est.)	7,968		−3.1%

=== 2020 census ===
As of the 2020 census, Rawlins had a population of 8,221. The median age was 36.3 years. 24.0% of residents were under the age of 18 and 13.3% of residents were 65 years of age or older. For every 100 females there were 119.6 males, and for every 100 females age 18 and over there were 124.0 males age 18 and over.

93.1% of residents lived in urban areas, while 6.9% lived in rural areas.

There were 3,126 households in Rawlins, of which 32.1% had children under the age of 18 living in them. Of all households, 47.0% were married-couple households, 22.8% were households with a male householder and no spouse or partner present, and 22.6% were households with a female householder and no spouse or partner present. About 30.2% of all households were made up of individuals and 10.2% had someone living alone who was 65 years of age or older.

There were 4,022 housing units, of which 22.3% were vacant. The homeowner vacancy rate was 4.1% and the rental vacancy rate was 31.5%.

Racial composition as of the 2020 census
Race	Number	Percent
White	6,343	77.2%
Black or African American	115	1.4%
American Indian and Alaska Native	155	1.9%
Asian	82	1.0%
Native Hawaiian and Other Pacific Islander	8	0.1%
Some other race	684	8.3%
Two or more races	834	10.1%
Hispanic or Latino (of any race)	2,072	25.2%

=== 2010 census ===
As of the census of 2010, there were 9,259 people, 3,443 households, and 2,206 families living in the city. The population density was 1,123.7 inhabitants per square mile (433.9/km^{2}). There were 3,960 housing units at an average density of 480.6 per square mile (185.6/km^{2}). The racial makeup of the city was 84.7% White, 1.1% African American, 1.3% Native American, 1.0% Asian, 0.1% Pacific Islander, 9.2% from other races, and 2.7% from two or more races. Hispanic or Latino of any race were 24.3% of the population.

There were 3,443 households, of which 35.5% had children under the age of 18 living with them, 48.2% were married couples living together, 10.2% had a female householder with no husband present, 5.6% had a male householder with no wife present, and 35.9% were non-families. 29.0% of all households were made up of individuals, and 7.3% had someone living alone who was 65 years of age or older. The average household size was 2.47 and the average family size was 3.04.

The median age in the city was 34.3 years. 25.5% of residents were under the age of 18; 9.5% were between the ages of 18 and 24; 29% were from 25 to 44; 26.8% were from 45 to 64; and 9.3% were 65 years of age or older. The gender makeup of the city was 54.7% male and 45.3% female.

=== 2000 census ===
As of the census of 2000, there were 8,538 people, 3,320 households, and 2,237 families living in the city. The population density was 1,153.4 people per square mile (445.5/km^{2}). There were 3,860 housing units at an average density of 521.4 per square mile (201.4/km^{2}). The racial makeup of the city was 85.86% White, 0.81% African American, 1.46% Native American, 0.84% Asian, 0.09% Pacific Islander, 8.28% from other races, and 2.65% from two or more races. Hispanic or Latino of any race were 21.05% of the population.

There were 3,320 households, out of which 33.9% had children under the age of 18 living with them, 52.6% were married couples living together, 10.5% had a female householder with no husband present, and 32.6% were non-families. 26.9% of all households were made up of individuals, and 8.6% had someone living alone who was 65 years of age or older. The average household size was 2.45 and the average family size was 2.97.

In the city, the population was spread out, with 26.0% under the age of 18, 10.1% from 18 to 24, 29.4% from 25 to 44, 24.2% from 45 to 64, and 10.3% who were 65 years of age or older. The median age was 36 years. For every 100 females, there were 111.5 males. For every 100 females age 18 and over, there were 112.8 males.

The median income for a household in the city was $36,600, and the median income for a family was $42,137. Males had a median income of $33,179 versus $22,580 for females. The per capita income for the city was $17,887. About 10.4% of families and 13.7% of the population were below the poverty line, including 18.2% of those under age 18 and 17.7% of those age 65 or over.

== Geography ==
Rawlins is located in Carbon County at 41°47′25″N 107°14′3″W (41.790397, -107.234297).

According to the United States Census Bureau, the city has a total area of 8.28 square miles (21.45 km^{2}), of which 8.24 square miles (21.34 km^{2}) is land and 0.04 square miles (0.10 km^{2}) is water. The city is approximately 6800 feet (2073 m) above sea level.

=== Climate ===
Rawlins' climate is semi-arid (Köppen climate classification BSk).

Climate data for Rawlins Municipal Airport, Wyoming (1991–2020 normals, extremes 1951–present)
Month	Jan	Feb	Mar	Apr	May	Jun	Jul	Aug	Sep	Oct	Nov	Dec	Year
Record high °F (°C)	56 (13)	58 (14)	78 (26)	79 (26)	88 (31)	97 (36)	98 (37)	98 (37)	95 (35)	82 (28)	70 (21)	60 (16)	98 (37)
Mean maximum °F (°C)	45.5 (7.5)	48.6 (9.2)	60.2 (15.7)	72.0 (22.2)	80.4 (26.9)	89.5 (31.9)	93.7 (34.3)	91.5 (33.1)	86.3 (30.2)	74.7 (23.7)	59.7 (15.4)	47.7 (8.7)	94.4 (34.7)
Mean daily maximum °F (°C)	31.5 (−0.3)	33.9 (1.1)	45.1 (7.3)	53.5 (11.9)	64.2 (17.9)	76.6 (24.8)	85.1 (29.5)	82.6 (28.1)	72.3 (22.4)	56.8 (13.8)	41.8 (5.4)	31.3 (−0.4)	56.2 (13.4)
Daily mean °F (°C)	22.3 (−5.4)	24.2 (−4.3)	33.6 (0.9)	40.4 (4.7)	49.8 (9.9)	59.9 (15.5)	67.9 (19.9)	65.8 (18.8)	56.5 (13.6)	43.6 (6.4)	31.3 (−0.4)	22.1 (−5.5)	43.1 (6.2)
Mean daily minimum °F (°C)	13.2 (−10.4)	14.5 (−9.7)	22.0 (−5.6)	27.3 (−2.6)	35.5 (1.9)	43.2 (6.2)	50.8 (10.4)	49.1 (9.5)	40.7 (4.8)	30.4 (−0.9)	20.8 (−6.2)	12.8 (−10.7)	30.0 (−1.1)
Mean minimum °F (°C)	−12.1 (−24.5)	−9.2 (−22.9)	1.4 (−17.0)	12.1 (−11.1)	22.1 (−5.5)	32.8 (0.4)	41.4 (5.2)	38.3 (3.5)	26.5 (−3.1)	11.6 (−11.3)	−0.5 (−18.1)	−9.9 (−23.3)	−19.6 (−28.7)
Record low °F (°C)	−36 (−38)	−36 (−38)	−21 (−29)	−11 (−24)	8 (−13)	21 (−6)	32 (0)	28 (−2)	8 (−13)	−20 (−29)	−24 (−31)	−35 (−37)	−36 (−38)
Average precipitation inches (mm)	0.42 (11)	0.48 (12)	0.66 (17)	1.26 (32)	1.46 (37)	0.87 (22)	0.72 (18)	0.73 (19)	0.89 (23)	0.68 (17)	0.47 (12)	0.40 (10)	9.04 (230)
Average snowfall inches (cm)	8.0 (20)	8.2 (21)	8.2 (21)	7.6 (19)	1.7 (4.3)	0.2 (0.51)	0.0 (0.0)	0.0 (0.0)	1.1 (2.8)	3.5 (8.9)	8.1 (21)	7.5 (19)	54.1 (137.51)
Average precipitation days (≥ 0.01 in)	5.5	6.1	6.8	10.0	10.1	6.6	5.7	6.2	6.4	6.8	5.9	6.0	82.1
Average snowy days (≥ 0.1 in)	6.7	6.6	7.1	5.5	1.3	0.1	0.0	0.0	0.5	2.2	5.6	6.9	42.5
Source: NOAA (snow, snow days 1951–2000)

== Government and infrastructure ==
The Wyoming State Penitentiary is located in Rawlins. The facility was operated by the Wyoming Board of Charities and Reform until that agency was dissolved as a result of a state constitutional amendment passed in November 1990.

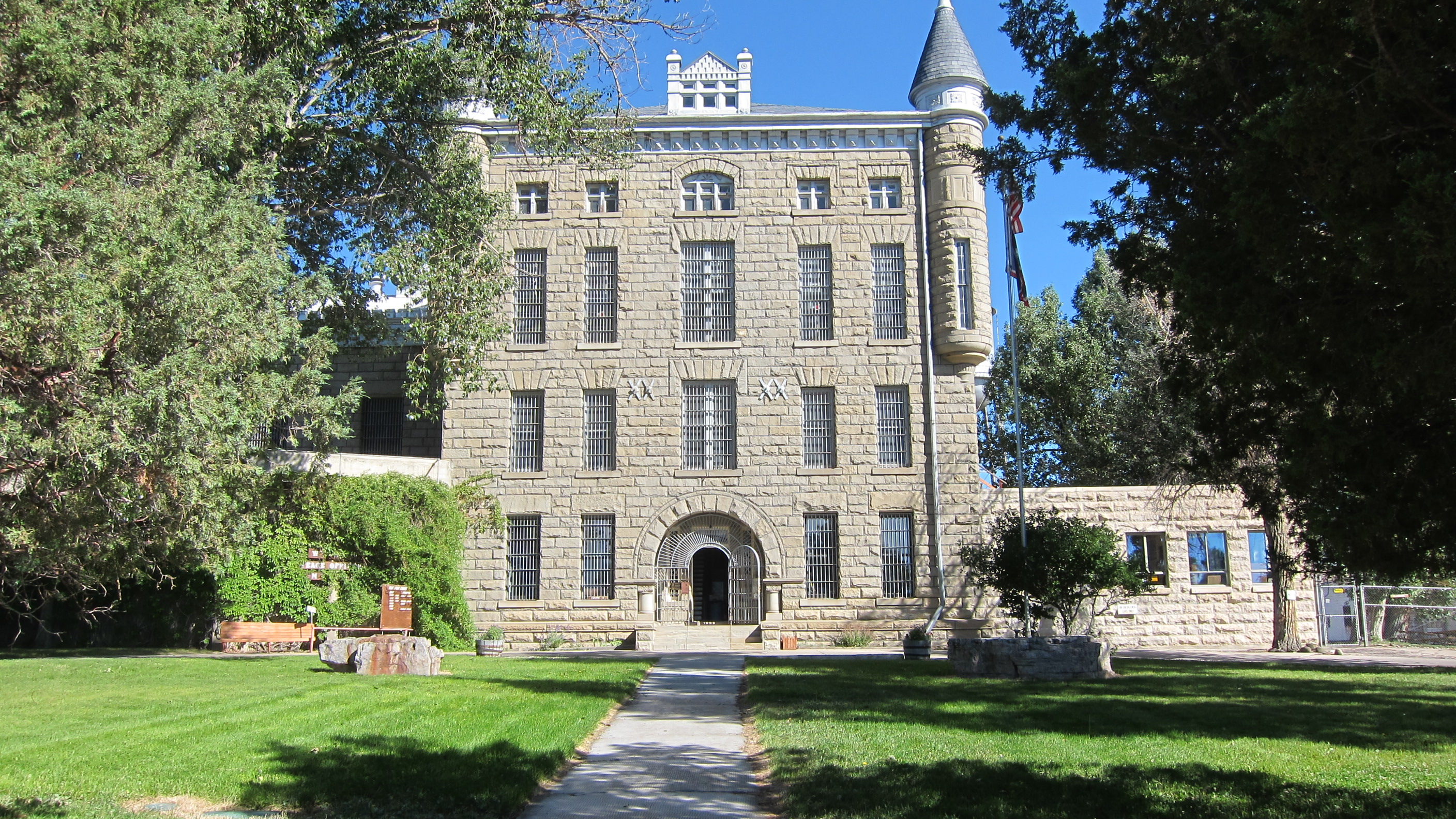
Wyoming Frontier Prison, operational from 1901 until 1981

The United States Postal Service operates the Rawlins Post Office.

== Education ==
Residents are zoned to schools in the Carbon County School District#1.

All residents are zoned to Rawlins Elementary School (elementary students formerly went to either Pershing, Mountain View, Sunny Side, or Highlands Hills Elementary School), Rawlins Middle School and Rawlins High School (rebuilt in 2015); Rawlins also offers an alternative school, the Carbon County Co-operative High School.

Western Wyoming Community College also offers outreach programs through the Carbon County Higher Education Center. The main campus is housed in the former Sunny Side Elementary School building.

Rawlins has a public library, a branch of the Carbon County Library System.

== Media ==
Rawlins is served by one print newspaper, the Rawlins Daily Times.

Radio stations licensed to Rawlins include KRAW 97.9 FM, a low-power FM community radio station and K255DH 98.9 FM, a translator for KRAL.

== Transportation ==
=== Highways ===
Interstate highways:

I-80

- East–west interstate running from New York City to San Francisco. I-80 runs through the south side of Rawlins, leading east 99 miles (159 km) to Laramie and west 108 miles (174 km) to Rock Springs. The I-80 business loop runs through the center of Rawlins, following Cedar Street before turning north onto Third Street, and then west onto Spruce Street.

U.S. highways:

US 30

- Runs concurrent with I-80. The US-30 business loop also runs concurrent with the I-80 business loop.

US 287

- Runs through Rawlins on east Cedar Street before moving north onto North Higley Boulevard (the 287 bypass). Leads northwest 125 miles (201 km) to Lander and east with I-80 to Laramie.

Wyoming state highways:

WYO 71

- Starts at CR401 near Teton Reservoir and travels through southern parts of Rawlins until ending at Wyoming 78 near I-80 exit 214.

WYO 78

- Wyoming Highway 78, also known as South Higley Boulevard, begins at the Wyoming State Penitentiary south of Rawlins, until ending at Wyoming 71 near I-80 exit 214.

WYO 789

- Runs concurrent with the I-80 business loop via Spruce Street before turning north on Third Street. Wyoming 789 meets US 287 north of town, where it runs concurrent with this highway.

=== Scheduled bus service ===
Scheduled bus service is offered by Greyhound Bus Lines.

=== Airport ===
The city of Rawlins is served by Rawlins Municipal Airport (Harvey Field).

=== Railroads ===
The Union Pacific Railroad provides freight service to Rawlins. Amtrak's Pioneer served the city from 1991 through 1997. While there is a proposal to re-start the service as of Jan 2024, there is currently no scheduled passenger rail service.

=== Continental Divide Trail ===
Rawlins is located along the 3,100 mile long path of the Continental Divide National Scenic Trail.

== "Rawlins Red" ==
"Rawlins Red" is a red pigment containing hematite, an oxide of iron that was mined near Rawlins. Paint containing Rawlins Red has anti-rust properties and is thought to have been used as the original paint on the Brooklyn Bridge.

== Republic of Texas ==
Rawlins displays a historical marker denoting the northernmost border of the Republic of Texas, which claimed land as far north as Carbon County.

== Notable people ==
- William L. Carlisle (1890–1964), one of America's last train robbers, imprisoned in Wyoming State Penitentiary
- Jesse Garcia (born 1982), actor who starred in Quinceañera
- Big Nose George (1834–1881), Wild West outlaw hanged by a lynch mob in Rawlins
- Lillian Heath (1865–1962), the first female doctor in Wyoming
- John J. Hickey (1911–1970), U.S. senator from Wyoming and governor of Wyoming
- Mike Lansing (born 1968), professional baseball player
- Russ Leatherman (born 1962), voice of Mr. Moviefone
- Ember Oakley, prosecutor and member of the Wyoming House of Representatives
- John Eugene Osborne (1858–1943), third governor of Wyoming, U.S. representative for Wyoming
- A. J. Rosier (1880–1932), state senator
- Larry Wilcox (born 1947), co-star of the popular 1970s TV show CHiPs; born in San Diego and raised in Rawlins
