= Rawlins Municipal Airport =

Coordinates: 41°48′20″N 107°12′0″W

Rawlins Municipal Airport Harvey Field
- IATA: RWL; ICAO: KRWL; FAA LID: RWL

Summary
- Airport type: Public
- Owner: Rawlins Carbon County Airport Board
- Serves: Rawlins, Wyoming
- Elevation AMSL: 6,813 ft / 2,077 m
- Website: www.rawlinsairportboard.com
- Interactive map of Rawlins Municipal Airport

Runways
Direction	Length		Surface
Direction	ft	m	Surface
4/22	7,008	2,136	Asphalt
11/29	4,322	1,317	Asphalt

Statistics (2021)
- Aircraft operations (year ending 6/30/2021): 6,030
- Source: Federal Aviation Administration

Rawlins Municipal Airport (IATA: RWL, ICAO: KRWL, FAA LID: RWL) (Harvey Field) is two miles (3 km) northeast of Rawlins, in Carbon County, Wyoming. The Rawlins Carbon County Airport Board owns it.

== Facilities ==
The airport covers 800 acres (320 ha) and has two asphalt runways: 4/22 is 7,008 x 100 ft (2,136 x 30 m) and 11/29 is 4,322 x 60 ft (1,317 x 18 m). In the year ending June 30, 2021, the airport had 6,030 aircraft operations, average 116 per week: 100% general aviation and <1% military.

== See also ==
- List of airports in Wyoming
