= Burnett (CDP), Wisconsin =

Census-designated place in Wisconsin, United States

Burnett, Wisconsin
- Census-designated place
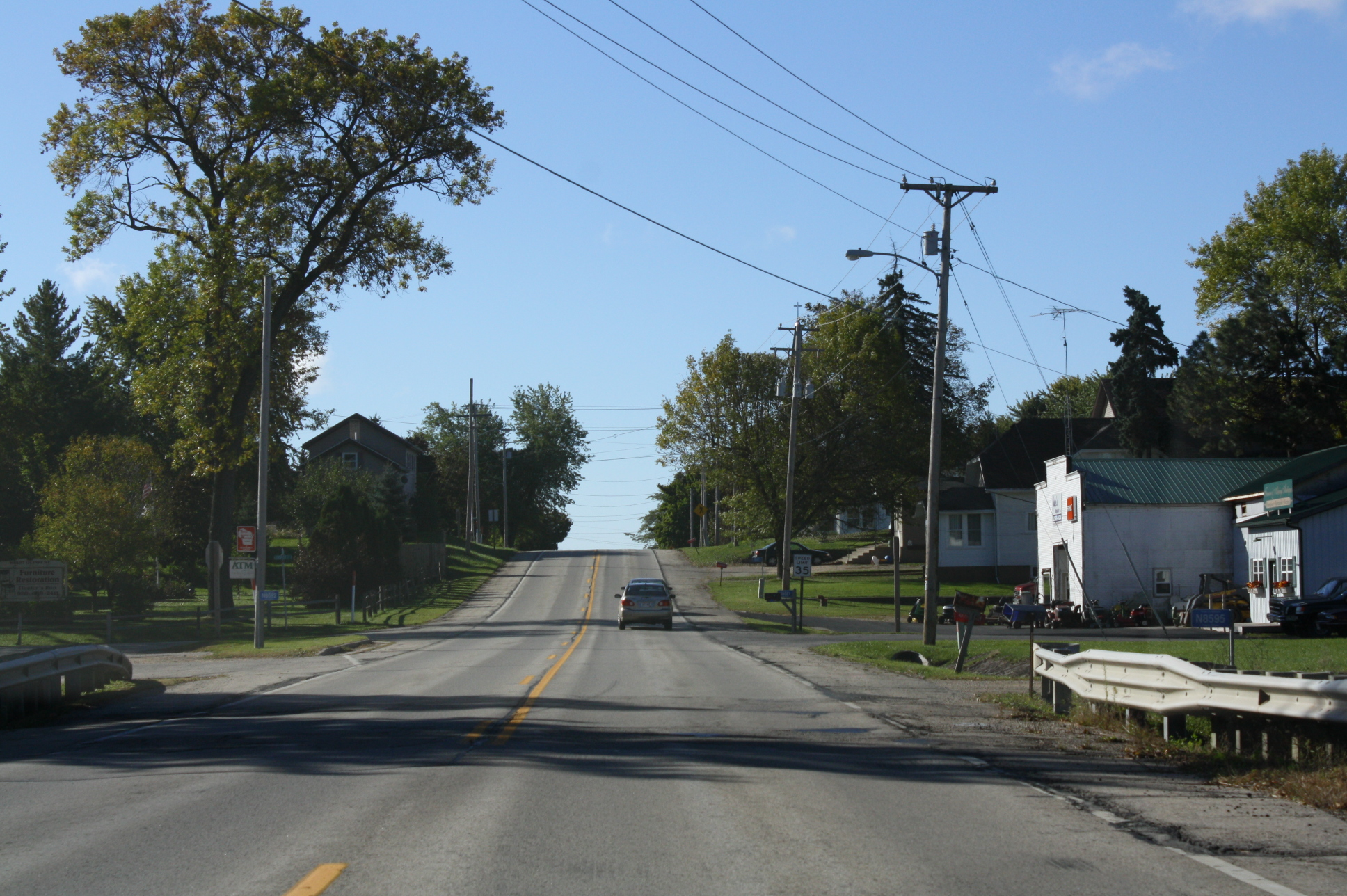
- Looking south in Burnett on WIS 26

- Location within Wisconsin
- Coordinates: 43°30′17″N 88°42′25″W
- Country: United States
- State: Wisconsin
- County: Dodge
- Town: Burnett

Area
  - Total: 0.250 sq mi (0.65 km^{2})
  - Land: 0.250 sq mi (0.65 km^{2})
  - Water: 0 sq mi (0 km^{2})
- Elevation: 873 ft (266 m)

Population (2010)
  - Total: 256
  - Density: 1,020/sq mi (395/km^{2})
- Time zone: UTC-6 (Central (CST))
  - Summer (DST): UTC-5 (CDT)
- ZIP code: 53922
- Area code: 920
- GNIS feature ID: 1562430

Burnett is an unincorporated census-designated place located in the town of Burnett, Dodge County, Wisconsin, United States. Burnett is located on Wisconsin Highway 26 5.5 miles (8.9 km) northwest of Horicon. Burnett has a post office with ZIP code 53922. As of the 2010 census, its population is 256.

== Images ==
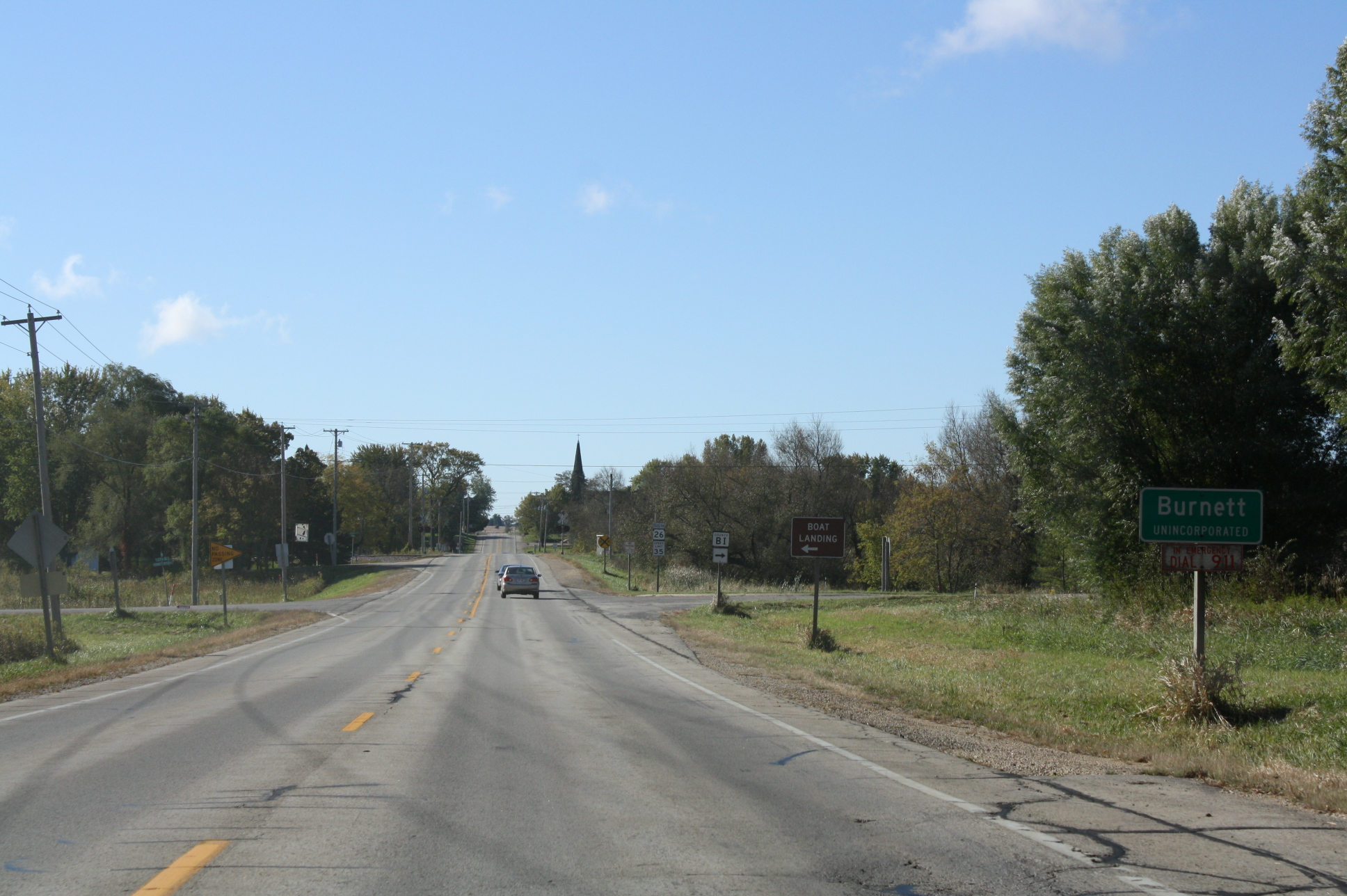
Looking south at Burnett sign

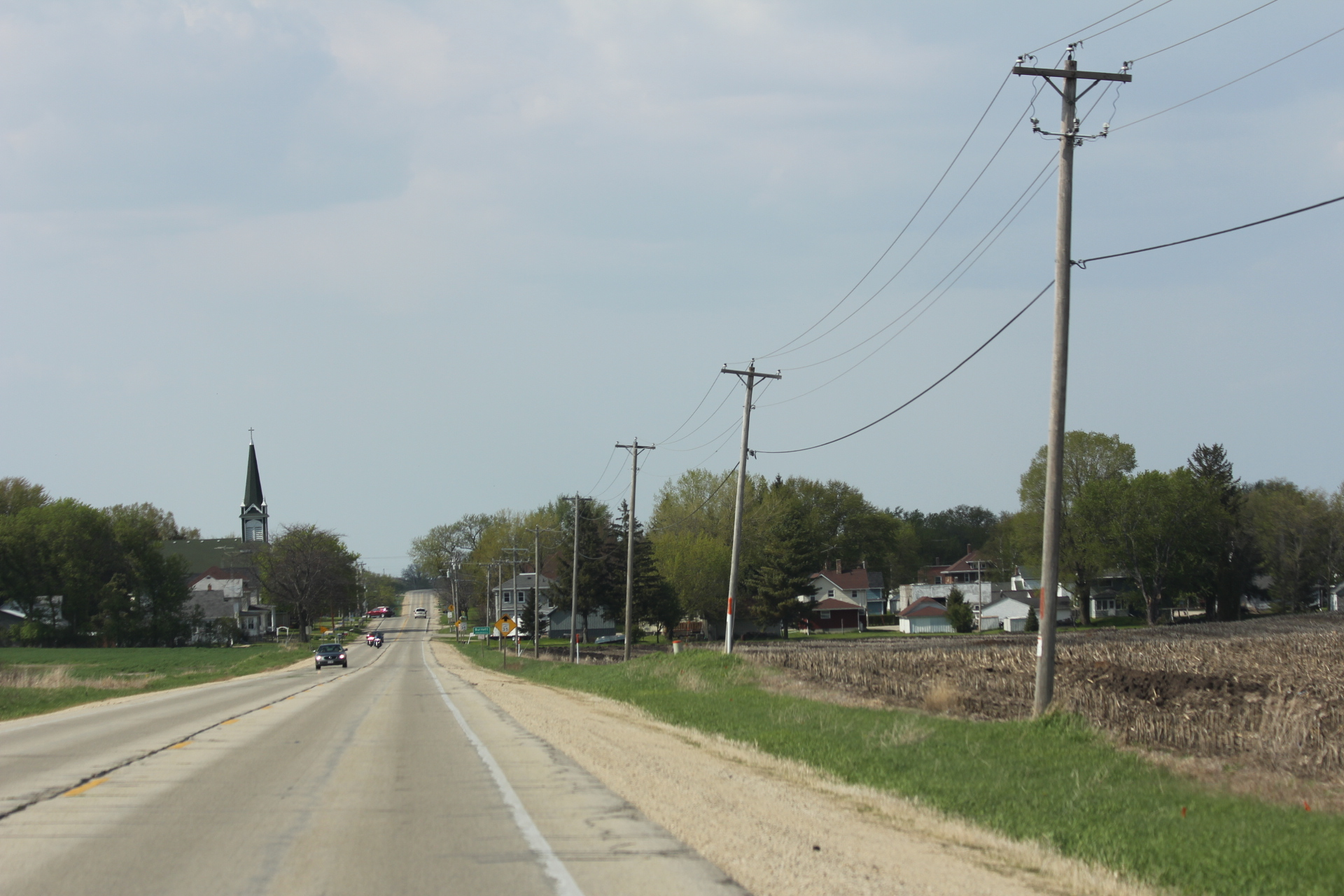
Panorama of Burnett looking north on WIS 26

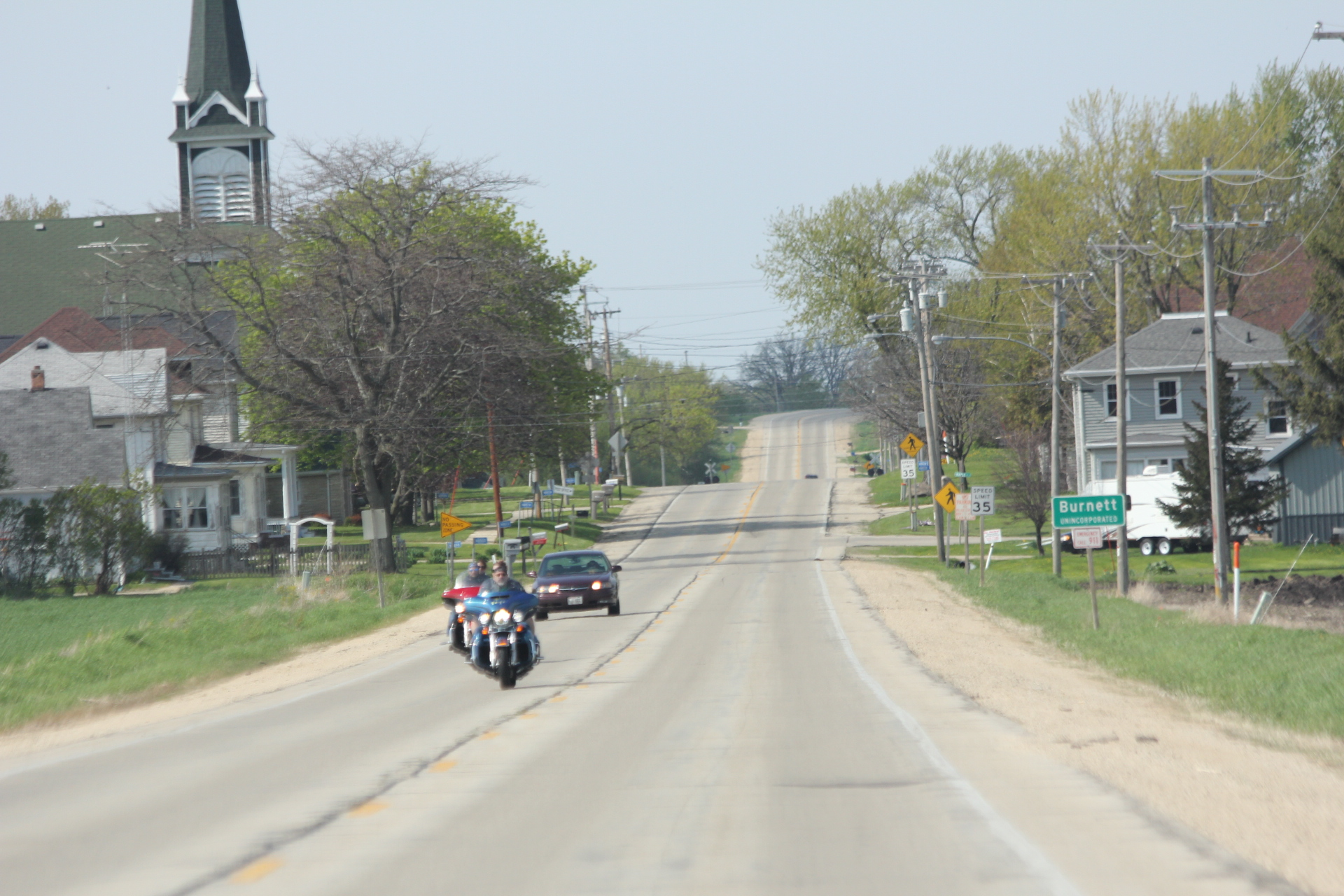
Looking north at Burnett sign
