= 17th Wisconsin Legislature =

Wisconsin legislative term for 1864

←	16th	18th	→
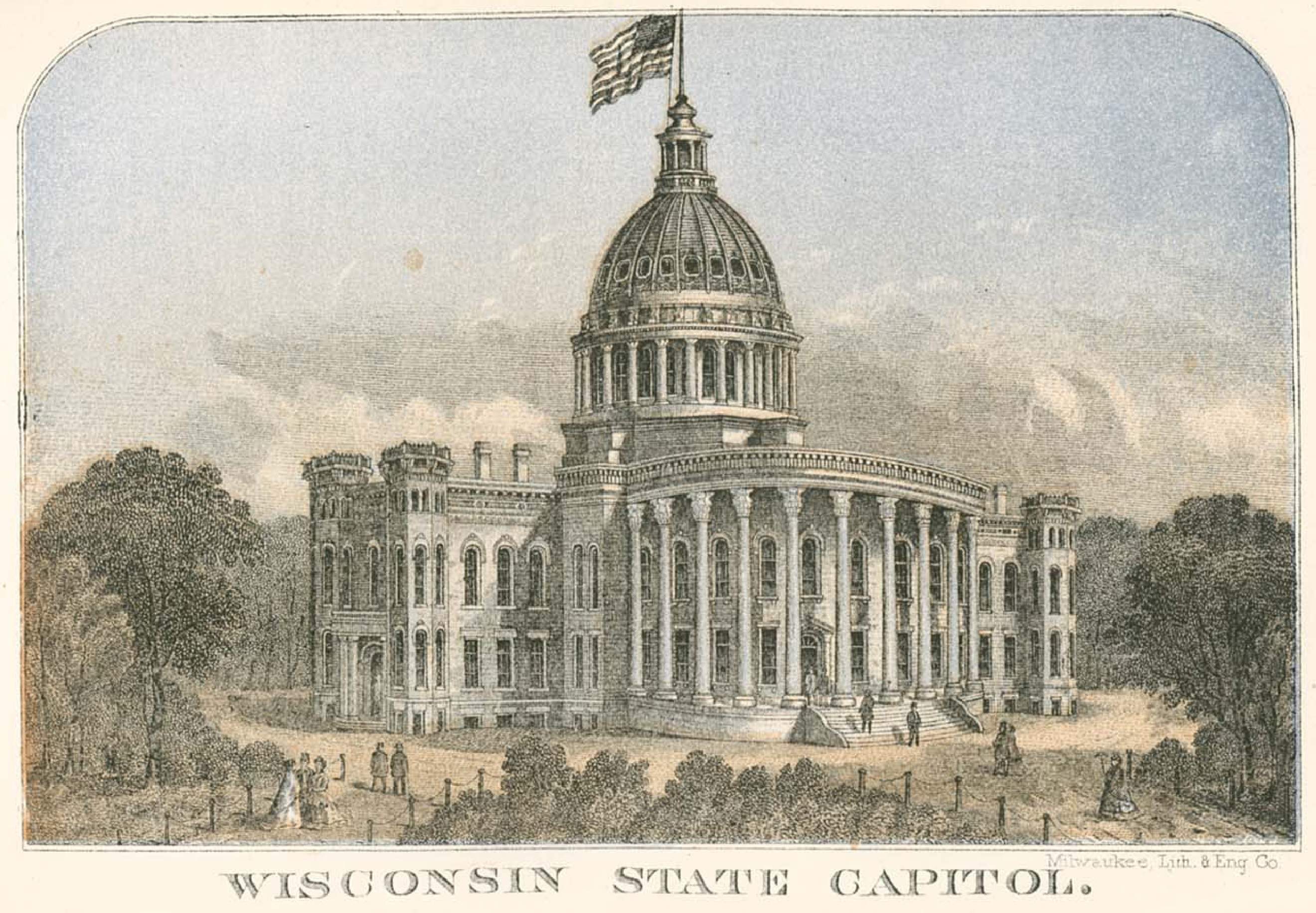
- Wisconsin State Capitol, 1863

Overview
- Legislative body: Wisconsin Legislature
- Meeting place: Wisconsin State Capitol
- Term: January 4, 1864 – January 2, 1865
- Election: November 3, 1863

Senate
- Members: 33
- Senate President: Wyman Spooner (U)
- President pro tempore: Smith S. Wilkinson (U)
- Party control: Republican

Assembly
- Members: 100
- Assembly Speaker: William W. Field (U)
- Party control: Republican

Sessions
- 1st: January 13, 1864 – April 4, 1864

The Seventeenth Wisconsin Legislature convened from January 13, 1864, to April 4, 1864, in regular session.

Senators representing odd-numbered districts were newly elected for this session and were serving the first year of a two-year term. Assembly members were elected to a one-year term. Assembly members and odd-numbered senators were elected in the general election of November 3, 1863. Senators representing even-numbered districts were serving the second year of their two-year term, having been elected in the general election held on November 4, 1862.

The governor of Wisconsin during this entire term was Republican James T. Lewis, of Columbia County, serving the first year of a two-year term, having won election in the 1863 Wisconsin gubernatorial election.

== Major events ==
- January 4, 1864: Inauguration of James T. Lewis as the 7th Governor of Wisconsin.
- May 5–7, 1864: Battle of the Wilderness took place in Spotsylvania County and Orange County, Virginia. Four regiments of Wisconsin Volunteers participated in the battle.
- May 9–21, 1864: Battle of Spotsylvania Court House took place in Spotsylvania County, Virginia. Five regiments of Wisconsin Volunteers participated in the battle.
- May 31 – June 12, 1864: Battle of Cold Harbor took place in Hanover County, Virginia. Five regiments of Wisconsin Volunteers participated in the battle.
- September 2, 1864: Union Army occupied Atlanta, Georgia.
- November 8, 1864: Abraham Lincoln re-elected as President of the United States.

== Major legislation ==
- February 19, 1864: Act to organize the county of Burnett, and locate the county seat thereof, 1864 Act 74
- February 26, 1864: Joint Resolution relative to the extension of time for the payment of government bounties to volunteers, 1864 Joint Resolution 2
- March 5, 1864: Joint Resolution relative to the vigorous prosecution of the war, the duty of congress and the people, tendering thanks to the army and navy, and suggesting the renomination of Abraham Lincoln, 1864 Joint Resolution 4
- March 22, 1864: Act to incorporate "Marquette College" in the second ward of the city of Milwaukee, 1864 Act 180
- April 4, 1864: Act to guard against the abuse of the elective franchise, and to preserve the purity of elections, by a registration of electors, 1864 Act 445

== Party summary ==
=== Senate summary ===
Senate Partisan composition Democratic: 11 seats National Union: 22 seats

	Party (Shading indicates majority caucus)			Total	
	Democratic	Union	Republican	Total	Vacant
End of previous Legislature	15	1	17	33	0
1st Session	11	22	0	33	0
Final voting share	33.33%	66.67%			
Beginning of the next Legislature	8	25	0	33	0

=== Assembly summary ===
Assembly Partisan composition Democratic: 29 seats National Union: 71 seats

	Party (Shading indicates majority caucus)			Total	
	Democratic	Union	Republican	Total	Vacant
End of previous Legislature	43	2	55	100	0
Start 1st Session	29	71	0	100	0
After March 16	29	70	0	99	1
Final voting share	29.29%	70.71%			
Beginning of the next Legislature	33	67	0	100	0

== Sessions ==
- 1st Regular session: January 13, 1864 – April 4, 1864

== Leaders ==
=== Senate leadership ===
- President of the Senate: Wyman Spooner
- President pro tempore: Smith S. Wilkinson

=== Assembly leadership ===
- Speaker of the Assembly: William W. Field

== Members ==
=== Members of the Senate ===
Members of the Wisconsin Senate for the Seventeenth Wisconsin Legislature:

Senate partisan representation Democratic: 11 seats Union: 22 seats

District	Counties	Senator	Residence	Party
01	Sheboygan	John E. Thomas	Sheboygan Falls	Dem.
02	Brown, Kewaunee	Frederick S. Ellis	Green Bay	Dem.
03	Ozaukee	John R. Bohan	Ozaukee	Dem.
04	Washington	Frederick O. Thorpe	West Bend	Dem.
05	Milwaukee (Northern Part)	William K. Wilson	Milwaukee	Dem.
06	Milwaukee (Southern Part)	Hugh P. Reynolds	Milwaukee	Dem.
07	Racine	Timothy D. Morris	Whitesville	Union
08	Kenosha	Anthony Van Wyck	Kenosha	Union
09	Adams, Juneau, Waushara	Alanson M. Kimball	Pine River	Union
10	Waukesha	William Blair	Waukesha	Union
11	Dane (Eastern Part)	Willard H. Chandler	Windsor	Union
12	Walworth	Newton Littlejohn	Whitewater	Union
13	Lafayette	James Earnest	Shullsburg	Dem.
14	Sauk	Smith S. Wilkinson	Prairie du Sac	Union
15	Iowa	George L. Frost	Mineral Point	Dem.
16	Grant	Milas K. Young	Glen Haven	Union
17	Rock	William A. Lawrence	Janesville	Union
18	Dodge (Western Part)	William E. Smith	Fox Lake	Union
19	Manitowoc & Calumet	Joseph Vilas	Manitowoc	Dem.
20	Fond du Lac	George F. Wheeler	Nanaupa	Union
21	Winnebago	Joseph B. Hamilton	Neenah	Union
22	Door, Oconto, Outagamie, Shawanaw	Joseph Harris	Sturgeon Bay	Union
23	Jefferson	J. D. Clapp	Fort Atkinson	Dem.
24	Green	Walter S. Wescott	Monroe	Union
25	Columbia	Jonathan Bowman	Kilbourn City	Union
26	Dane (Western Part)	Thomas Hood	Madison	Union
27	Marathon, Portage, Waupaca, Wood	Alexander S. McDill	Plover	Union
28	Ashland, Burnett, Dallas, Douglas, La Pointe, Pierce, Polk, St. Croix	Austin H. Young	Prescott	Union
29	Marquette, Green Lake	Charles S. Kelsey	Montello	Union
30	Bad Ax, Crawford, Richland	William Ketcham	Richland City	Union
31	La Crosse, Monroe	Angus Cameron	La Crosse	Union
32	Buffalo, Chippewa, Clark, Dunn, Eau Claire, Jackson, Pepin, Trempealeau	Carl C. Pope	Black River Falls	Union
33	Dodge (Eastern Part)	Satterlee Clark	Horicon	Dem.

=== Members of the Assembly ===
Members of the Assembly for the Seventeenth Wisconsin Legislature:

Assembly partisan representation Democratic: 29 seats Union: 71 seats

Senate District	County	District	Representative	Party	Residence
09	Adams		Anson Rood (Until March 16)	Union	Kilbourn City
28	Ashland, Burnett, Dallas, Douglas, La Pointe, Polk		Henry D. Barron	Union	St. Croix Falls
02	Brown		William J. Abrams	Dem.	Green Bay
32	Buffalo, Pepin, Trempealeau		Fayette Allen	Union	Durand
19	Calumet		Thomas McLean	Dem.	Stockbridge
32	Chippewa, Dunn, Eau Claire		Thaddeus C. Pound	Union	Chippewa Falls
32	Clark, Jackson		Calvin R. Johnson	Union	Black River Falls
25	Columbia	1	A. J. Turner	Union	Portage
25	Columbia	2	Edwin W. McNitt	Union	Otsego
25	Columbia	3	Yates Ashley	Union	Pardeeville
30	Crawford		Horace Beach	Union	Prairie du Chien
11	Dane	1	William W. Blackman	Union	Stoughton
11	Dane	2	William H. Miller	Union	Door Creek
26	Dane	3	Alden S. Sanborn	Dem.	Mazomanie
26	Dane	4	George Wright	Union	Mount Horeb
26	Dane	5	George B. Smith	Dem.	Madison
18	Dodge	1	George H. Adams	Union	Danville
18	Dodge	2	William H. Green	Union	Lowell
18	Dodge	3	Oscar F. Jones	Dem.	Juneau
33	Dodge	4	Max Bachhuber	Dem.	Farmersville
33	Dodge	5	John G. Daily	Dem.	Hustisford
22	Door, Oconto, Shawano		Herman Naber	Union	Shawano
20	Fond du Lac	1	William Starr	Union	Ripon
20	Fond du Lac	2	James McElroy	Union	Waupun
20	Fond du Lac	3	Edwin H. Galloway	Union	Fond du Lac
20	Fond du Lac	4	Charles Geisse	Dem.	Taycheedah
20	Fond du Lac	5	Edgar Wilcox	Union	Byron
16	Grant	1	Hanmer Robbins	Union	Platteville
16	Grant	2	Allen Taylor	Union	Dickeyville
16	Grant	3	J. Allen Barber	Union	Lancaster
16	Grant	4	William W. Field	Union	Fennimore
16	Grant	5	Wood R. Beach	Union	Beetown
24	Green	1	William W. McLaughlin	Union	Oregon
24	Green	2	Frederick B. Rolph	Union	Monroe
29	Green Lake		James Field	Union	Berlin
15	Iowa	1	Wyman L. Lincoln	Union	Avoca
15	Iowa	2	Francis Little	Union	Mineral Point
23	Jefferson	1	Robert Hass	Dem.	Watertown
23	Jefferson	2	Aaron B. Smith	Union	Lake Mills
23	Jefferson	3	Joseph Powers	Union	Hebron
23	Jefferson	4	James M. Bingham	Union	Palmyra
09	Juneau		Lyman Clark	Union	Kildare
08	Kenosha		A. Constantine Barry	Union	Sylvania
02	Kewaunee		Nelson Boutin	Dem.	Kewaunee
31	La Crosse		Samuel S. Burton	Union	La Crosse
13	Lafayette	1	Tarleton Dunn	Dem.	Elk Grove
13	Lafayette	2	Samuel Cole	Union	Gratiot
19	Manitowoc	1	Peter P. Fuessenich	Union	Eaton
19	Manitowoc	2	Thomas Thornton	Dem.	Clark's Mills
19	Manitowoc	3	David Smoke	Dem.	Two Rivers
27	Marathon, Wood		Bartholomew Ringle	Dem.	Wausau
29	Marquette		Robert Cochran	Dem.	Westfield
05	Milwaukee	1	Levi Hubbell	Union	Milwaukee
05	Milwaukee	2	David Knab	Dem.	Milwaukee
06	Milwaukee	3	John W. Eviston	Dem.	Milwaukee
06	Milwaukee	4	Napoleon B. Caswell	Union	Milwaukee
06	Milwaukee	5	J. C. U. Niedermann	Union	Milwaukee
05	Milwaukee	6	Frederick T. Zetteler	Dem.	Milwaukee
05	Milwaukee	7	James Watts	Dem.	Granville
06	Milwaukee	8	Edward McGarry	Dem.	Milwaukee
06	Milwaukee	9	Anton Frey	Dem.	Franklin
31	Monroe		Carleton E. Rice	Union	Sparta
22	Outagamie		George Kreiss	Dem.	Appleton
03	Ozaukee		William T. Bonniwell Jr.	Dem.	Cedarburg
28	Pierce, St. Croix		Joseph S. Elwell	Union	Hudson
27	Portage		John Phillips	Union	Stevens Point
07	Racine	1	George C. Northrop	Union	Racine
07	Racine	2	Henry Stevens	Union	Caledonia
07	Racine	3	Philo Belden	Union	Rochester
30	Richland		John Walworth	Union	Richland Center
17	Rock	1	Thomas Earle	Union	Fulton
17	Rock	2	Thomas H. Goodhue	Union	Whitewater
17	Rock	3	Guy Wheeler	Union	Janesville
17	Rock	4	Perry Bostwick	Union	Beloit
17	Rock	5	Hamilton Richardson	Union	Janesville
17	Rock	6	Jerome Burbank	Union	Brodhead
14	Sauk	1	Alonzo Wilcox	Union	Spring Green
14	Sauk	2	Argalus W. Starks	Union	Baraboo
01	Sheboygan	1	Carl Zillier	Dem.	Sheboygan
01	Sheboygan	2	Louis Wolf	Dem.	Sheboygan Falls
01	Sheboygan	3	Michael Winter	Union	Adell
01	Sheboygan	4	Mark Martin	Union	Onion River
30	Vernon	1	William H. Officer	Union	Springville
30	Vernon	2	Albert Bliss	Union	Readstown
12	Walworth	1	John Jeffers	Union	Darien
12	Walworth	2	Daniel Smith	Union	Richmond
12	Walworth	3	Daniel C. Roundy	Union	Geneva
12	Walworth	4	Lucius Allen	Union	East Troy
04	Washington	1	Nicholaus Marx	Dem.	Wayne
04	Washington	2	Henry Hildebrandt	Dem.	Station
04	Washington	3	Martin Schottler	Dem.	Staatsville
10	Waukesha	1	William Costigan	Dem.	Marshall
10	Waukesha	2	Joel R. Carpenter	Union	Oconomowoc
10	Waukesha	3	Norman Shultis	Union	North Prairie
10	Waukesha	4	John Schmidt	Union	Muskego
27	Waupaca		Albert K. Osborn	Union	Iola
09	Waushara		William C. Webb	Union	Wautoma
21	Winnebago	1	Richard C. Russell	Union	Oshkosh
21	Winnebago	2	Jeremiah Hunt	Union	Menasha
21	Winnebago	3	George S. Barnum	Union	Waukau

== Employees ==
=== Senate employees ===
- Chief Clerk: Frank M. Stewart
  - Assistant Clerk: P. H. Brady
    - Bookkeeper: J. Spooner
  - Engrossing Clerk: Sineus B. Dibble
  - Enrolling Clerk: Thomas Marshall
  - Transcribing Clerk: F. O. Wisner
- Sergeant-at-Arms: Nelson Williams
  - 1st Assistant Sergeant-at-Arms: H. Esperson
  - 2nd Assistant Sergeant-at-Arms: John B. Eugene
- Postmaster: Henry H. Taylor
  - Assistant Postmaster: S. Raymond
- Doorkeeper: G. M. Cary
  - Assistant Doorkeeper: J. P. Miller
  - Assistant Doorkeeper: J. H. Jones
  - Assistant Doorkeeper: Otis A. Albee
  - Assistant Doorkeeper: William P. Close
  - Gallery Doorkeeper: B. S. Miller
- Firemen:
  - Barnet Wilson
  - William W. Baker
  - William Holden
- Messengers:
  - John C. Hutchins
  - Albert F. Dexter
  - Rufus H. Roys
  - William C. Jones
  - C. C. Frey
  - Frank C. Freeman
- Porter: John Crowley

=== Assembly employees ===
- Chief Clerk: John S. Dean
  - Assistant Clerk: Ephraim W. Young
    - Bookkeeper: E. L. Fitzhugh
  - Engrossing Clerk: A. L. Rockwell
  - Enrolling Clerk: J. H. Balch
  - Transcribing Clerk: A. C. Byers
- Sergeant-at-Arms: Alexander McDonald Thomson
  - 1st Assistant Sergeant-at-Arms: William P. Forsyth
  - 2nd Assistant Sergeant-at-Arms: Lewis M. Hammond
- Postmaster: N. A. Spooner
  - 1st Assistant Postmaster: Hiram Beckwith
  - 2nd Assistant Postmaster: Oscar Babcock
- Doorkeepers:
  - Franklin Kelly
  - W. L. Abbott
  - W. E. Angell
  - C. Saran
  - C. E. Tanburg
  - William Spencer
- Firemen:
  - Oliver Johnson
  - A. C. Stannard
  - Robert Axon
  - C. McCarthy
- Speaker's Messenger: Adam C. Waltz
- Chief Clerk's Messenger: James E. Dean
- Sergeant-at-Arms' Messenger: Arthur Tilden
- Messengers:
  - Moses Flesh
  - Patrick McKanna
  - Robert Airis
  - Louis Sholes
  - Marion M. Young
  - William P. Beach
  - Linus S. Webb
  - Fred Chynoweth
