= 16th Wisconsin Legislature =

Wisconsin legislative term for 1863

←	15th	17th	→
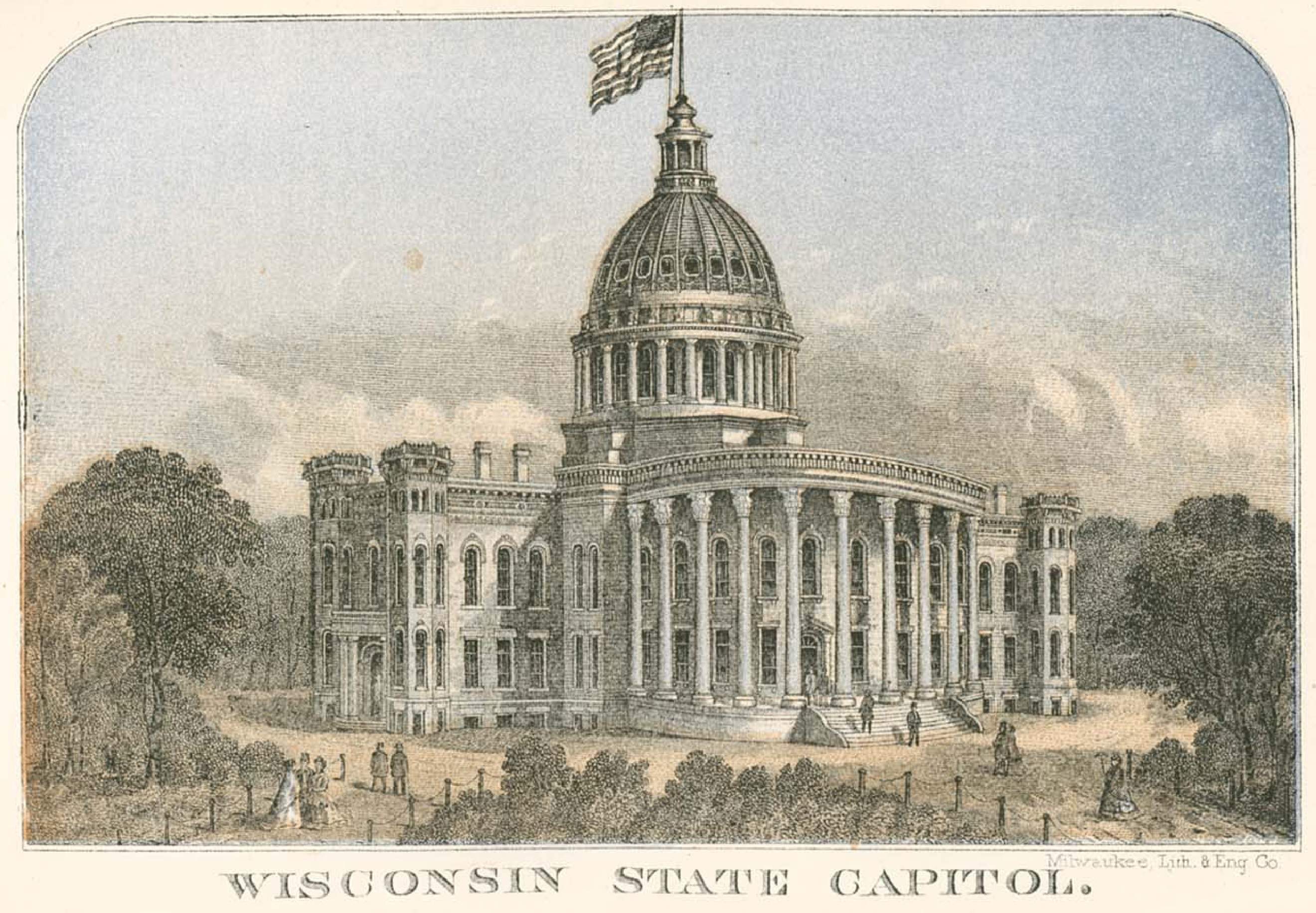
- Wisconsin State Capitol, 1863

Overview
- Legislative body: Wisconsin Legislature
- Meeting place: Wisconsin State Capitol
- Term: January 5, 1863 – January 4, 1864
- Election: November 4, 1862

Senate
- Members: 33
- Senate President: Vacant
- President pro tempore: Wyman Spooner (R)
- Party control: Republican

Assembly
- Members: 100
- Assembly Speaker: J. Allen Barber (R)
- Party control: Republican

Sessions
- 1st: January 14, 1863 – April 2, 1863

The Sixteenth Wisconsin Legislature convened from January 14, 1863, to April 2, 1863, in regular session.

Senators representing odd-numbered districts were newly elected for this session and were serving the first year of a two-year term. Assembly members were elected to a one-year term. Assembly members and even-numbered senators were elected in the general election of November 4, 1862. Senators representing even-numbered districts were serving the second year of their two-year term, having been elected in the general election held on November 5, 1861.

The governor of Wisconsin during this entire term was Republican Edward Salomon, of Manitowoc County, serving the second year of a two-year term, having won the 1861 lieutenant gubernatorial election, then having ascended to the gubernatorial office following the death of governor Louis P. Harvey in April 1862.

== Major events ==
- January 1, 1863: U.S. President Abraham Lincoln's Emancipation Proclamation went into effect.
- January 22, 1863: James R. Doolittle re-elected United States Senator by the Wisconsin Legislature in Joint Session.
- April 30–May 8, 1863: Battle of Chancellorsville took place in Spotsylvania County, Virginia. Six regiments of Wisconsin Volunteers participated in the battle.
- May 18–July 4, 1863: Siege of Vicksburg took place in Warren County, Mississippi. Seventeen regiments of Wisconsin Volunteers participated in the siege.
- July 1–3, 1863: Battle of Gettysburg took place near Gettysburg, Pennsylvania. Six regiments of Wisconsin Volunteers participated in the battle. Future-Governor of Wisconsin Lucius Fairchild and future State Treasurer Henry Baetz were wounded.
- November 3, 1863: James T. Lewis elected Governor of Wisconsin.

== Major legislation ==
- March 13, 1863: Joint Resolution recommending Colonels J. C. Starkweather and Geo. E. Bryant to promotion, 1863 Joint Resolution 2
- March 25, 1863: Joint Resolution relative to adopting state flag, 1863 Joint Resolution 4
- March 26, 1863: Act to provide for continuing the work on the state capitol, 1863 Act 107
- March 28, 1863: Act to authorize the borrowing of money to repel invasion, suppress insurrection and defend the state in time of war, 1863 Act 157
- April 1, 1863: Act authorizing the governor to take care of the sick and wounded soldiers of the Wisconsin volunteers, and appropriating money out of the treasury for that purpose, 1863 Act 196
- April 1, 1863: Act to provide for compensating parties whose property may be injured or destroyed in consequence of mobs or riots, 1863 Act 211
- April 1, 1863: Act to provide for the enrollment of persons liable to perform military duty, and the organization of the state militia for active service, 1863 Act 242
- April 2, 1863: Act to provide for the relief of families of persons who may die in the military service of the United States or of the state of Wisconsin, 1863 Act 264

== Party summary ==
=== Senate summary ===
Senate Partisan composition Democratic: 15 seats National Union: 1 seat Republican: 17 seats

	Party (Shading indicates majority caucus)			Total	
	Democratic	Union	Republican	Total	Vacant
End of previous Legislature	11	2	20	33	0
1st Session	15	1	17	33	0
Final voting share	45.45%	54.55%			
Beginning of the next Legislature	11	22	0	33	0

=== Assembly summary ===
Assembly Partisan composition Democratic: 43 seats National Union: 2 seats Republican: 55 seats

	Party (Shading indicates majority caucus)			Total	
	Democratic	Union	Republican	Total	Vacant
End of previous Legislature	46	10	42	98	1
Start of 1st Session	44	2	54	100	0
after February 8	43	2	55	100	0
Final voting share	43%	57%			
Beginning of the next Legislature	29	71	0	100	0

== Sessions ==
- 1st Regular session: January 14, 1863 – April 2, 1863

== Leaders ==
=== Senate leadership ===
- President of the Senate: Vacant
- President pro tempore: Wyman Spooner

=== Assembly leadership ===
- Speaker of the Assembly: J. Allen Barber

== Members ==
=== Members of the Senate ===
Members of the Wisconsin Senate for the Sixteenth Wisconsin Legislature:

Senate partisan representation Democratic: 15 seats Union: 1 seat Republican: 17 seats

District	Counties	Senator	Residence	Party
01	Sheboygan	John E. Thomas	Sheboygan Falls	Dem.
02	Brown, Kewaunee	Edward Hicks	Green Bay	Dem.
03	Ozaukee	John R. Bohan	Ozaukee	Dem.
04	Washington	Frederick O. Thorpe	West Bend	Dem.
05	Milwaukee (Northern Part)	William K. Wilson	Milwaukee	Dem.
06	Milwaukee (Southern Part)	Edward Keogh	Milwaukee	Dem.
07	Racine	Timothy D. Morris	Whitesville	Rep.
08	Kenosha	Hermon S. Thorp	Bristol	Rep.
09	Adams, Juneau, Waushara	Alanson M. Kimball	Pine River	Rep.
10	Waukesha	George C. Pratt	Waukesha	Dem.
11	Dane (Eastern Part)	Willard H. Chandler	Windsor	Rep.
12	Walworth	Wyman Spooner	Elkhorn	Rep.
13	Lafayette	James H. Earnest	Shullsburg	Dem.
14	Sauk	Smith S. Wilkinson	Prairie du Sac	Rep.
15	Iowa	George L. Frost	Mineral Point	Dem.
16	Grant	Milas K. Young	Glen Haven	Rep.
17	Rock	William W. Lawrence	Janesville	Rep.
18	Dodge (Western Part)	Joel Rich	Juneau	Dem.
19	Manitowoc, Calumet	Joseph Vilas	Manitowoc	Dem.
20	Fond du Lac	George W. Mitchell	Ripon	Dem.
21	Winnebago	Joseph B. Hamilton	Neenah	Rep.
22	Door, Oconto, Outagamie, Shawanaw	Thomas R. Hudd	Appleton	Dem.
23	Jefferson	J. D. Clapp	Fort Atkinson	Dem.
24	Green	Edmund A. West	Monroe	Rep.
25	Columbia	Jonathan Bowman	Kilbourn City	Rep.
26	Dane (Western Part)	Benjamin F. Hopkins	Madison	Rep.
27	Marathon, Portage, Waupaca, Wood	Alexander S. McDill	Plover	Rep.
28	Ashland, Burnett, Dallas, Douglas, La Pointe, Pierce, Polk, St. Croix	Herman L. Humphrey	Hudson	Union
29	Marquette, Green Lake	Charles S. Kelsey	Montello	Rep.
30	Bad Ax, Crawford, Richland	William S. Purdy	Viroqua	Rep.
31	La Crosse, Monroe	Angus Cameron	La Crosse	Rep.
32	Buffalo, Chippewa, Clark, Dunn, Eau Claire, Jackson, Pepin, Trempealeau	M. D. Bartlett	Durand	Rep.
33	Dodge (Eastern Part)	Satterlee Clark	Horicon	Dem.

=== Members of the Assembly ===
Members of the Assembly for the Sixteenth Wisconsin Legislature:

Assembly partisan representation Democratic: 43 seats Union: 2 seats Republican: 55 seats

Senate District	County	District	Representative	Party	Residence
09	Adams		Otis B. Lapham	Rep.	Friendship
28	Ashland, Burnett, Dallas, Douglas, La Pointe, Polk		Henry D. Barron	Union	St. Croix Falls
02	Brown		Frederick S. Ellis	Dem.	Green Bay
32	Buffalo, Pepin, Trempealeau		Alfred Newman	Rep.	Trempealeau
19	Calumet		James Robinson	Dem.	Chilton
32	Chippewa, Dunn, Eau Claire		William H. Smith	Dem.	Eau Galle
32	Clark & Jackson		Carl C. Pope	Rep.	Black River Falls
25	Columbia	1	A. J. Turner	Rep.	Portage
25	Columbia	2	John Q. Adams	Rep.	Fall River
25	Columbia	3	Yates Ashley	Rep.	Pardeeville
30	Crawford		James Fisher	Dem.	Eastman
11	Dane	1	Charles R. Head	Rep.	Albion
11	Dane	2	William H. Miller	Rep.	Door Creek
26	Dane	3	Alden S. Sanborn	Dem.	Mazomanie
26	Dane	4	George Wright	Rep.	Mount Horeb
26	Dane	5	George Hyer	Dem.	Madison
18	Dodge	1	Oliver Ashley	Rep.	Fox Lake
18	Dodge	2	John F. McCollum	Dem.	Trenton
18	Dodge	3	Oscar F. Jones	Dem.	Juneau
33	Dodge	4	Albert Burtch	Dem.	Mayville
33	Dodge	5	Ferdinand Wagner	Dem.	Watertown
22	Door, Oconto, Shawano		George C. Ginty	Rep.	Oconto
20	Fond du Lac	1	William Starr	Rep.	Ripon
20	Fond du Lac	2	Freeman M. Wheeler	Rep.	Nanaupa
20	Fond du Lac	3	Edwin H. Galloway	Rep.	Fond du Lac
20	Fond du Lac	4	Samuel O'Hara	Dem.	Fond du Lac
20	Fond du Lac	5	Egbert Foster	Dem.	Foster
16	Grant	1	John Harms (until Feb. 8)	Dem.	Platteville
16	Grant	1	John H. Rountree (from Feb. 8)	Rep.	Platteville
16	Grant	2	James F. Chapman	Dem.	Potosi
16	Grant	3	J. Allen Barber	Rep.	Lancaster
16	Grant	4	William W. Field	Rep.	Fennimore
16	Grant	5	Robert Glenn	Rep.	Wyalusing
24	Green	1	Walter S. Wescott	Rep.	Farmers Grove
24	Green	2	Ezra Wescott	Rep.	Skinner
29	Green Lake		Samuel W. Smith	Union	Markesan
15	Iowa	1	David McFarland	Dem.	Highland
15	Iowa	2	John H. Vivian	Rep.	Mineral Point
23	Jefferson	1	Emil Rothe	Dem.	Watertown
23	Jefferson	2	Nathan S. Greene	Rep.	Milford
23	Jefferson	3	Lucien B. Caswell	Rep.	Fort Atkinson
23	Jefferson	4	James M. Bingham	Rep.	Palmyra
09	Juneau		James B. Frazell	Dem.	Wonewoc
08	Kenosha		Benjamin T. Hatch	Rep.	Kenosha
02	Kewaunee		Mathias Simon	Dem.	Ahnapee
31	La Crosse		Enos M. Philips	Rep.	Big Valley
13	Lafayette	1	Joseph White	Dem.	Cottage Inn
13	Lafayette	2	Lloyd T. Pullen	Rep.	Argyle
19	Manitowoc	1	Daniel Shanahan	Dem.	Newtonburo
19	Manitowoc	2	James Cahill	Dem.	Paquette
19	Manitowoc	3	Elijah K. Rand	Dem.	Manitowoc
27	Marathon & Wood		Levi P. Powers	Dem.	Grand Rapids
29	Marquette		Horatio S. Thomas	Dem.	Briggsville
05	Milwaukee	1	John Sharpstein	Dem.	Milwaukee
05	Milwaukee	2	George Abert	Dem.	Milwaukee
06	Milwaukee	3	John W. Eviston	Dem.	Milwaukee
06	Milwaukee	4	Martin Larkin Jr.	Dem.	Milwaukee
06	Milwaukee	5	Peter V. Deuster	Dem.	Milwaukee
05	Milwaukee	6	Adam Poertner	Dem.	Milwaukee
05	Milwaukee	7	John Hanrahan	Dem.	Good Hope
06	Milwaukee	8	Edward Collins	Dem.	Root Creek
06	Milwaukee	9	John Bentley	Dem.	Milwaukee
31	Monroe		William W. Jackson	Rep.	Tomah
22	Outagamie		Byron Douglas	Dem.	Appleton
03	Ozaukee		Robert Power	Dem.	Ozaukee
28	Pierce & St. Croix		Charles B. Cox	Rep.	River Falls
27	Portage		Enoch Webster	Rep.	Amherst
07	Racine	1	Horatio T. Taylor	Rep.	Racine
07	Racine	2	Orlando C. Munroe	Rep.	Racine
07	Racine	3	Hiram L. Gilmore	Rep.	North Cape
30	Richland		John Walworth	Rep.	Richland Center
17	Rock	1	Jonathan Cory	Rep.	Footville
17	Rock	2	Joseph Spaulding	Rep.	Janesville
17	Rock	3	Jacob Fowle	Rep.	Emerald Grove
17	Rock	4	C. Mortimer Treat	Rep.	Ogden
17	Rock	5	Allen C. Bates	Rep.	Janesville
17	Rock	6	Denison Alcott	Rep.	Spring Valley
14	Sauk	1	Alonzo Wilcox	Rep.	Spring Green
14	Sauk	2	Argalus W. Starks	Rep.	Baraboo
01	Sheboygan	1	Carl Zillier	Dem.	Sheboygan
01	Sheboygan	2	Charles Œtling	Dem.	Herman
01	Sheboygan	3	Henry Hayes	Dem.	Cascade
01	Sheboygan	4	Benjamin Dockstader	Rep.	Plymouth
30	Vernon	1	James H. Layne	Rep.	Viroqua
30	Vernon	2	Daniel B. Priest	Rep.	Viroqua
12	Walworth	1	Samuel Pratt	Rep.	Spring Prairie
12	Walworth	2	Thomas W. Hill	Rep.	Springfield
12	Walworth	3	Charles H. Sturtevant	Rep.	Delavan
12	Walworth	4	George H. Foster	Rep.	Whitewater
04	Washington	1	Adam Schantz	Dem.	Addison
04	Washington	2	Henry Hildebrandt	Dem.	Station
04	Washington	3	Martin Schottler	Dem.	Staatsville
10	Waukesha	1	Silas Richardson	Dem.	Waukesha
10	Waukesha	2	Elisha W. Edgerton	Rep.	Waterville
10	Waukesha	3	David G. Snover	Dem.	Eagle
10	Waukesha	4	Nelson Burroughs	Dem.	Waukesha
27	Waupaca		Albert K. Osborn	Rep.	Iola
09	Waushara		William C. Webb	Rep.	Wautoma
21	Winnebago	1	William E. Hanson	Rep.	Oshkosh
21	Winnebago	2	Michael Hogan	Dem.	Menasha
21	Winnebago	3	Emery F. Davis	Rep.	Oshkosh

== Employees ==
=== Senate employees ===
- Chief Clerk: Frank M. Stewart
  - Assistant Clerk: J. M. Randall
  - Engrossing Clerk: G. W. Campbell
  - Enrolling Clerk: George W. Stoner
  - Transcribing Clerk: J. J. Tschudy
- Sergeant-at-Arms: Luther Basford
  - Assistant Sergeant-at-Arms: James L. Wilder
- Postmaster: James L. Hosford
  - Assistant Postmaster: John Van t'Woud
- Doorkeeper: B. S. Miller
  - Assistant Doorkeeper: Francis Mika
  - Assistant Doorkeeper: Samuel Bachman
  - Assistant Doorkeeper: Paul Halverson
- Firemen:
  - Alex Stilwell
  - John Crowley
- Messengers:
  - J. E. Brown
  - John Hutchins
  - Albert F. Dexter
  - Frank Kellogg
- Porter: George E. Albee

=== Assembly employees ===
- Chief Clerk: John S. Dean
  - Assistant Clerk: Ephraim W. Young
    - Bookkeeper: Merrick P. Wing
  - Engrossing Clerk: Herbert A. Lewis
  - Enrolling Clerk: S. Canning Fisher
  - Transcribing Clerk: Henry C. Hadley
- Sergeant-at-Arms: A. M. Thomson
  - 1st Assistant Sergeant-at-Arms: C. D. Lon
  - 2nd Assistant Sergeant-at-Arms: D. S. Hawley
- Postmaster: M. B. Patchin
  - 1st Assistant Postmaster: John B. Eugene
  - 2nd Assistant Postmaster: Oscar Babcock
- Doorkeeper: Franklin Kelly
  - Assistant Doorkeeper: A. J. Fuller
  - Assistant Doorkeeper: P. P. Davis
  - Assistant Doorkeeper: William C. Lesure
- Firemen:
  - H. H. Hayward
  - Philip Carey
  - Iver Knudsen
- Messengers:
  - Adam Waltz
  - James E. Dean
  - Richard L. Hayward
  - Edgar C. McLaughlin
  - Patrick W. Lannen
  - William H. Miller
  - Louis Sholes
  - George D. Potter
  - Mark W. Bailey
