= Copperville, Maryland =

Copperville, Maryland may refer to the following places in Maryland:

- Copperville, Carroll County, Maryland
- Copperville, Talbot County, Maryland
