= Jeremiah Dodge =

19th century Wisconsin pioneer

Member of the Wisconsin State Assembly
- In office January 6, 1868 – January 4, 1869
- Preceded by: Joseph Allen
- Succeeded by: William P. Dewey
- Constituency: Grant 3rd district
- In office January 3, 1853 – January 2, 1854
- Preceded by: District established
- Succeeded by: Milas K. Young
- Constituency: Grant 5th district
- In office January 7, 1850 – January 6, 1851
- Preceded by: Davis Gillilan
- Succeeded by: William Biddlecome
- Constituency: Grant 3rd district

Personal details
- Born: February 20, 1809 Clinton, Dutchess County, New York, U.S.
- Died: March 24, 1877 (aged 68) Lancaster, Wisconsin, U.S.
- Cause of death: Stroke
- Resting place: Hillside Cemetery, Lancaster
- Party: Republican; Democratic (before 1861); Know Nothing (1844)
- Spouses: Roccena Ashley (m. 1834; died 1841); Rachel Matilda Ashley (m. 1843–1877)
- Children: Roccena Matilda (Copeland)^{(b. 1845; died 1919)}; John Wilber Dodge^{(b. 1848; died 1855)}; John Wilbur Dodge^{(b. 1856; died 1941)}; Jeremiah Edwin Dodge Jr.^{(b. 1860; died 1880)}
- Occupation: Farmer

Jeremiah Edwin Dodge (February 20, 1809 – March 24, 1877) was an American farmer, politician, and Wisconsin pioneer. He served three terms in the Wisconsin State Assembly, representing central Grant County during the 1850, 1853, and 1868 sessions. Originally a Democrat, he became a Republican after the outbreak of the Civil War in 1861.

== Biography ==
Jeremiah Dodge was born in the hamlet of Pleasant Plains, in the town of Clinton, Dutchess County, New York, on February 20, 1809. As a young man, he emigrated west to Tecumseh, Michigan, where he was appointed postmaster. He enlisted for service in the militia during the Black Hawk War, but the war was over by the time his company reached the frontier.

In 1835, he sought a new home further west, in what is now Grant County, Wisconsin. At the time, this was still part of the Michigan Territory. He purchased a homestead in what is now Beetown, Wisconsin, before returning to Michigan on horseback to retrieve his wife and property.

He studied law, and, in 1842 he traveled to Cambridge, Massachusetts, to study under Joseph Story and Simon Greenleaf at Harvard University. After returning to the Wisconsin Territory, Dodge only briefly practiced law. Ultimately, he chose to focus on farming on his homestead in Beetown.

== Political career ==
Politically, Dodge was seen trying to establish a branch of the "Native American" (Know Nothing) Party in Grant County, but he ultimately went into elected office as a member of the Democratic Party. He was elected in 1849 to represent central Grant County in the Wisconsin State Assembly for the 3rd Wisconsin Legislature. He was subsequently elected again in 1852, for service in the 6th Wisconsin Legislature. During this time, Dodge became one of the founders of the Grant County Agricultural Society and the Wisconsin Agricultural Society, ultimately becoming an officer in both organizations.

In 1854, Dodge received the Democratic nomination for another term in the Assembly, but declined their nomination. The seat was ultimately won by William W. Field, who represented the new Republican Party. Dodge did ultimately run again for Wisconsin Senate in 1857, but lost to Republican Noah Virgin.

In 1860, Dodge ran for Grant County circuit court clerk on the Democratic Party ticket, but lost again. This was ultimately the last time he stood for election as a Democrat. He became a Republican shortly after the start of the American Civil War. Dodge attended the Republican county convention in 1861 and sought the nomination for state senate, but did not succeed.

In 1867, Dodge received the Republican Party nomination for State Assembly, and was elected to his third and final term. He was offered renomination in 1868, but declined to run again.

Dodge remained active in agricultural affairs and the old settlers club until his death. In his later years, he resided in Lancaster, Wisconsin, where he died of a stroke on March 24, 1877.

== Personal life and family ==
Jeremiah Dodge was one of three children born to medical doctor John Dodge and his first wife Sallie (née Hawkins). His mother died shortly after his birth, and his father subsequently married two more times, having at least 11 more children. He was a distant cousin of Wisconsin Territory governor and U.S. senator Henry Dodge; The Dodge family were descendants of Tristram Dodge, who emigrated from England to the Massachusetts Bay Colony in the 1650s and later became one of the first English colonists on Block Island, Rhode Island.

Jeremiah Dodge married twice, both wives were daughters of Charles Ashley, who followed Dodge to Grant County, Wisconsin, from New Hampshire. His first wife was Roccena—they married in 1834 and she died in 1841, leaving no children. Dodge subsequently married Roccena's younger sister, Rachel Matilda Ashley, and had four children with her. One son died in childhood, but the Rachel and the other three children survived him.

Wisconsin State Assembly
| Preceded by Robert M. Briggs | Member of the Wisconsin State Assembly from the Grant 3rd district January 7, 1850 – January 6, 1851 | Succeeded by William Biddlecome |
| New district created | Member of the Wisconsin State Assembly from the Grant 5th district January 3, 1853 – January 2, 1854 | Succeeded by Milas K. Young |
| Preceded by Joseph Allen | Member of the Wisconsin State Assembly from the Grant 3rd district January 6, 1868 – January 4, 1869 | Succeeded by William P. Dewey |
