= Ruth Starr Rose =

American artist (1887–1965)

- Born: Ruth Starr; 1887; Eau Claire, Wisconsin, U.S.
- Died: 1965 (aged 77–78); Alexandria, Virginia, U.S.
- Known for: Painting
- Movement: Modern Painting
- Spouse: William Searls Rose
- Awards: Mary Hills Goodwin Prize

Ruth Starr Rose (1887–1965) was an American artist. She was a painter, lithographer and serigrapher, and best known for her paintings of African American life in Maryland in the 1930s and 1940s.

This important woman artist's work has toured throughout Maryland, the United States, and Europe as a unique example of an early American Shared Community expressed through pigment and paint. Additionally, Rose is credited as the first white artist to create a work of art for a black church. The subject of her fresco, Pharaoh's Army Got Drownded, was to honor the minister's son who perished in training for WWII.

== Early life and education ==
Rose was born in 1887 into an affluent family in Eau Claire, Wisconsin. Her family were active abolitionists; her paternal grandfather was William Starr, a timber businessman who had been placed under house arrest by U.S. Marshals for his refusal to comply with the fugitive slave laws. On her paternal side she was descended from Dr. Comfort Starr (1589–1659), one of the founders of Harvard College. Her mother was Ida May Hill Starr, an author and musician. Nathan Comfort Starr (1896–1981) a medieval literature professor, was her brother, and her sister-in-law (married to Nathan) was photographer and art historian, Nina Howell Starr.

The family moved to Maryland's Eastern Shore to Hope House after the turn of the century, in 1906. Hope House was in the Tilghman and Lloyd families and existed as a plantation, before the Starr family moved in. In 1907, the Starr family remodeled the home. The family lived differently than their neighbors, in a racially integrated community where they socialized with their African American neighbors and friends.

In Maryland, she and her mother attended the African American DeShields United Methodist Church in Copperville, Maryland. Many years later, Rose painted a mural of the biblical story of Moses parting the Red Sea in this same church titled, And the Pharaoh’s Army Got Drowned (1940) and it served as a metaphor for breaking away from slavery. Nearby towns of Unionville and Copperville were African American communities, and often where Rose would spend time and paint her subjects. Rose was an art activist, and it was her familiarity with town residents that allowed her a glimpse into the African American experience.

She left Hope House, the family property, to study, just as her mother had, at Vassar College in Poughkeepsie, New York. After graduation from Vassar, she enrolled in the Art Students League of New York where she worked with artist Victoria Hutson Huntley, Mabel Dwight, Harry Sternberg, and George C. Miller.

== Career and works ==
Rose focused her paintings on African American life on the Chesapeake Bay. Rose and her family had long supported civil rights for African American people and they were well connected with black artists and performers, including Paul Robeson, Lead Belly, and Roland Hayes. Rose's subjects included local descendants of Frederick Douglass and Harriet Ross Tubman, a professional sail maker, female crab pickers, and heroic WWII veterans. She portrayed her friends with "dignity and compassion" which was rare in portrayals of people of color during that era.

In 1937, when she was living in Caldwell, New Jersey, she was awarded the Mary Hills Goodwin Prize at the exhibition of the National Association of Women Painters and Sculptors in New York City for her painting "The Twilight Quartet," a portrait of four African American musicians from the historic settlement of Copperville, Maryland. In 1957 she was awarded a prize in the graphics category at the exhibition of the National Association of Women Artists.

Rose had a deep regard for African American spirituals. As early as 1956, she was credited by Howard University's Professor James A. Porter, the father of African American art history, for her representation of African American spirituals which he commended her for as being the most compassionate and complete to date. Her ear was moved by their dissonant beauty, and she created illustrations of the songs reflecting how members of her congregation felt as they sang the melodies. Alain LeRoy Locke selected two of her African American spirituals for his pioneering work, The Negro in Art in 1940. Her biographers, Barbara Paca and Nina Khrushcheva, have connected her writing and depiction of African American spirituals to the earliest foundation of African American religion in the United States.

Ruth Starr Rose's works have been exhibited at the Metropolitan Museum of Art, The Whitney, The Philadelphia Museum of Art, the Library of Congress, and throughout Europe. She was included in the 1947 and the 1951 Dallas Museum of Fine Arts exhibitions of the National Serigraph Society.

== Personal ==
In 1914, Rose married William Searls Rose, who was from a wealthy family. They lived near New York City and adopted two children. They spent summers at Hope House and at the adjoining farm, Pickbourne, which had been given to Rose as a wedding gift.

Harlem Renaissance artist Prentiss Taylor and Weyhe Gallery's Carl Zigrosser, founder of the Prints Department at the Philadelphia Museum of Art, were her lifelong friends and mentors.
