= Senator Spooner =

Senator Spooner may refer to:

- John Coit Spooner (1843–1919), U.S. Senator from Wisconsin
- Wyman Spooner (1795–1877), Wisconsin State Senator
