= William Hull (Wisconsin politician) =

19th century American politician

William H. Hull

9th Speaker of the Wisconsin State Assembly
- In office January 9, 1856 – January 14, 1857
- Preceded by: Charles Sholes
- Succeeded by: Wyman Spooner

Member of the Wisconsin State Assembly from the Grant 2nd district
- In office January 1, 1854 – January 1, 1857
- Preceded by: Hyman E. Block
- Succeeded by: Albert W. Emery

District Attorney of Grant County
- In office January 1, 1851 – January 1, 1853
- Preceded by: William Biddlecome
- Succeeded by: J. Allen Barber

Personal details
- Born: William Hull; 1815 New Orleans, Louisiana, U.S.
- Died: September 15, 1881 (aged 65–66) La Crosse, Wisconsin, U.S.
- Resting place: Oak Grove Cemetery; La Crosse, Wisconsin
- Party: Democratic; Whig (before 1850)
- Spouses: first wife (died before 1856); Margaret A. Jones (m. 1856; div. 1857)
- Children: William Sinclair Hull; (died 1943)
- Education: Norwich University

Military service
- Allegiance: United States
- Branch/service: United States Army
- Years of service: 1835–1838
- Rank: 2nd Lieutenant, USA
- Battles/wars: Second Seminole War

William H. Hull (c.1815 – September 15, 1881) was an American lawyer, Democratic politician, and Wisconsin pioneer. He was the 9th speaker of the Wisconsin State Assembly (1856) and represented Grant County.

== Early life ==
Born on a plantation near New Orleans, Louisiana, Hull's father was wealthy and provided him with a good education. Hull graduated from Norwich University in 1833. At age 19, he was commissioned as a 2nd lieutenant in the United States Army and served in the Second Seminole War in Florida. While there, his brother was killed in a duel. Hull took leave from the Army and studied law under Judah P. Benjamin.

He investigated his brother's death and came to the conclusion that his opponent had fired before the word to fire had been given. Hull vowed to kill the man. A short time later he encountered the man in New Orleans and made good on his vow. He then fled Louisiana and moved north to the Wisconsin Territory.

During the Seminole War, Hull had become acquainted with Lieutenant Jefferson Davis, who had previously served as second-in-command to Zachary Taylor at Fort Crawford in the Wisconsin Territory. Hull traveled there and resumed his duties with the Army. While at Crawford, he was sent to Fort Snelling, and, on his return, camped at the site where the city of La Crosse would later stand.

== Wisconsin career ==
After his resignation from the United States Army, he relocated to Potosi, in Grant County, Wisconsin, where he participated in the lead mining industry and practiced law. He also became involved in politics, first as a Henry Clay Whig, then as a supporter of Henry Dodge and leader of a faction of "Dodge Whigs". He eventually sided with the Democratic Party in 1850, and was elected that year as District Attorney for Grant County, an office which he held from 1851 to 1852. He was then chosen as Chief Clerk of the Wisconsin State Senate for the 1851 session, and, in 1853, was elected as a Democrat to represent Potosi and southwestern Grant County in the Wisconsin State Assembly for the 1854 session. He was re-elected to State Assembly for the 1855 and 1856 sessions. In 1856, he was chosen as Speaker of the Assembly.

As speaker, Hull enthusiastically supported the case of Governor William A. Barstow in the controversy over the 1855 election, and was determined to lead the Assembly in defiance of the Wisconsin Supreme Court. He and the other Democrats relented after Barstow dropped his claim and accepted Coles Bashford as Governor of Wisconsin. While Hull was serving as speaker, the Governor of Louisiana, Robert C. Wickliffe, sent a message to Governor Bashford which charged Hull with murder and requested his extradition to Louisiana to face trial. Bashford ignored the request.

In 1856, the U.S. Congress made a generous land grant to the state to be used for railroad development. An extra session of the legislature was called in the fall to determine the proper allocation of the land. At that time, Milwaukee businessman Byron Kilbourn engaged in mass bribery of the Governor and important members of the legislature to obtain tracts of the railroad grant. At first, Hull threatened to expose the bribery scheme, marching into the capitol with a list of the officials that he claimed had been bribed, but later dropped his objections and voted with Kilbourn's sympathizers. An investigation after the fact found that Hull had been one of the largest beneficiaries of the "corruption bonds."

== Personal life and later years ==
Hull was a descendant of Jean-Baptiste Le Moyne de Bienville, the 2nd colonial governor of French Louisiana.

Hull was widowed by the death of his first wife. In 1855, Hull became desperately in love with Margaret A. "Maggie" Jones. She refused his proposals several times before eventually relenting in 1856. They had one son together, but Hull proved too eccentric and they divorced within a year. Maggie would eventually go on to marry Isaac E. Messmore and move to Michigan with him.

After his term as speaker, Hull relocated to La Crosse, Wisconsin, where he continued his law practice. He died in La Crosse on September 15, 1881. His obituary states that he remained depressed over his divorce for the rest of his life and eventually drank himself to death.

Wisconsin State Assembly
Preceded by Hyman E. Block	Member of the Wisconsin State Assembly from the Grant 2nd district January 1, 1854 – January 1, 1857	Succeeded by Albert W. Emery
Preceded by Charles Sholes	Speaker of the Wisconsin State Assembly; 1856 – 1857	Succeeded by Wyman Spooner
Legal offices
Preceded by William Biddlecome	District Attorney of Grant County, Wisconsin; 1851 – 1853	Succeeded by J. Allen Barber
