= J. Allen Barber =

American politician (1809–1881)

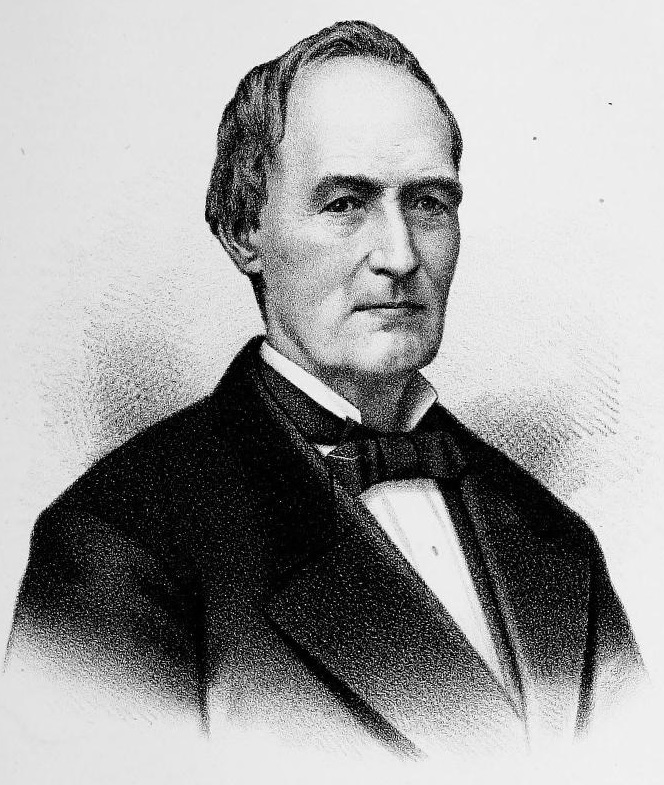

Member of the U.S. House of Representatives from Wisconsin's 3rd district
- In office March 4, 1871 – March 3, 1875
- Preceded by: Amasa Cobb
- Succeeded by: Henry S. Magoon

15th Speaker of the Wisconsin Assembly
- In office January 14, 1863 – January 13, 1864
- Preceded by: Joseph W. Beardsley
- Succeeded by: William W. Field

Member of the Wisconsin Senate from the 16th district
- In office January 1, 1856 – January 1, 1858
- Preceded by: Nelson Dewey
- Succeeded by: Noah H. Virgin

Member of the Wisconsin State Assembly
- In office January 1, 1863 – January 1, 1865
- Preceded by: Joseph Trotter Mills
- Succeeded by: Henry Utt
- Constituency: Grant 3rd district
- In office January 1, 1853 – January 1, 1854
- Preceded by: Position Established
- Succeeded by: Milas K. Young
- Constituency: Grant 5th district
- In office January 1, 1852 – January 1, 1853
- Preceded by: Robert M. Briggs
- Succeeded by: Jeremiah E. Dodge
- Constituency: Grant 4th district

District Attorney of Grant County
- In office January 1, 1853 – January 1, 1855
- Preceded by: William Hull
- Succeeded by: James M. Goodhue
- In office January 1, 1846 – January 1, 1849
- Preceded by: James M. Goodhue
- Succeeded by: William Biddlecome
- In office January 1, 1840 – January 1, 1844
- Preceded by: F. J. Munger
- Succeeded by: Willis H. Chapman

President of the Lancaster Village Board
- In office April 1875 – May 1878
- Preceded by: Addison Burr
- Succeeded by: Position abolished
- In office April 1860 – April 1863
- Preceded by: John Chandler Holloway
- In office April 1856 – April 1857
- Preceded by: Position established
- Succeeded by: J. H. Hyde

Personal details
- Born: January 17, 1809 Georgia, Vermont
- Died: June 28, 1881 (aged 72) Lancaster, Wisconsin
- Resting place: Hillside Cemetery; Lancaster, Wisconsin
- Party: Republican; Union (1864); Whig (before 1855)
- Children: 2 sons, 2 daughters
- Parents: Joel Barber (father); Aseneth Melvin Barber (mother)

Joel Allen Barber (January 17, 1809 – June 28, 1881) was an American lawyer and politician. He served two terms in the United States House of Representatives from Wisconsin's 3rd congressional district, he was the 15th Speaker of the Wisconsin State Assembly, and he served one term in the Wisconsin State Senate.

== Early life and education ==
Barber was born in the town of Georgia, in Franklin County, Vermont, to Joel and Aseneth Melvin Barber. He worked on a farm until age 18, then entered the Georgia Academy. After graduating from the academy, he attended the University of Vermont in Burlington, where he studied law. He left the university after two and a half years and read law with George P. Marsh. He was admitted to the bar in 1833 in Prince George's County, Maryland, where he was teaching school, and commenced practice in Fairfield, Vermont.

== Career ==
Barber moved to the Wisconsin Territory in 1837, settling in Lancaster, in Grant County, where he continued to practice law. He served as county clerk for Grant County, for four years and as district attorney for three terms. He served as member of the first constitutional convention of Wisconsin in 1846.

Barber was elected to the Wisconsin State Assembly in 1852, 1853, as a Whig, in 1863 as a Republican, and, 1864, on the National Union ticket. He was elected speaker for the 1863 session. He also served one two-year term as Grant County's representative in the Wisconsin State Senate in 1856 and 1857.

After establishing a law partnership with George Clementson in 1869, Barber was elected to the United States House of Representatives as a Republican, serving in the Forty-second and Forty-third Congresses from March 4, 1871, to March 3, 1875. He served as the representative of Wisconsin's 3rd congressional district. While Barber was serving in Congress, George Clementson conducted the legal work of their firm. Barber was not a candidate for renomination in 1874, and was succeeded by Henry S. Magoon. Upon leaving Congress, he resumed the practice of law with Clementson.

== Death ==
Barber died in Lancaster, Wisconsin, June 28, 1881, following an attack of peritonitis and was interred in Hillside Cemetery.

== Sources ==
- United States Congress. "J. Allen Barber (id: B000122)". Biographical Directory of the United States Congress.

U.S. House of Representatives
| Preceded by Amasa Cobb | Member of the U.S. House of Representatives from Wisconsin's 3rd congressional district March 4, 1871 – March 3, 1875 | Succeeded by Henry S. Magoon |
Political offices
| Preceded by James W. Beardsley | Speaker of the Wisconsin State Assembly; 1863 – 1864 | Succeeded by William W. Field |
Legal offices
| Preceded by William Hull | District Attorney of Grant County, Wisconsin; 1840 – 1844 | Succeeded by Willis H. Chapman |
| Preceded by James M. Goodhue | District Attorney of Grant County, Wisconsin; 1846 – 1849 | Succeeded by William Biddlecome |
| Preceded by F. J. Munger | District Attorney of Grant County, Wisconsin; 1853 – 1855 | Succeeded by James M. Goodhue |
