= Hollis Latham =

American politician (1812–1886)

Member of the Wisconsin State Assembly
- In office 1862–1862
- Preceded by: Wyman Spooner
- Succeeded by: Samuel Pratt

Member of the Second Wisconsin Constitutional Convention
- In office 1847–1848

Personal details
- Born: 12 March 1812 Northfield, Vermont
- Died: 22 February 1886 (aged 73) Elkhorn, Wisconsin
- Party: Democratic

Hollis Latham (March 12, 1812 – February 22, 1886) was a Wisconsin farmer and politician.

Born in Northfield, Vermont, where he went to school, Latham moved to Milwaukee, Wisconsin Territory, in 1836. In 1837, he moved to the town of Spring Prairie, Wisconsin Territory and then settled on February 27, 1837, in Elkhorn where he was a farmer; he would remain there for the rest of his life. He married Lemira Bradley in April 1838.

He served as the town justice of the peace, as county clerk, treasurer and superintendent of the poor, and as a trustee of the Wisconsin School for the Deaf. Latham served in the second Wisconsin Constitutional Convention of 1847–1848, and was one of the seven-member "Committee on Executive, Legislative and Administrative Provisions" assigned to create new provisions for the second proposed constitution.

In 1852, he was captain of the town's unit of the state militia. As of 1854, he was one of the secretaries of the Walworth County Agricultural Society., a title he would hold for some time, although by 1880 he would be its treasurer

Latham was elected a member of the Wisconsin State Assembly for 1862, where he (a Democrat) replaced Republican Wyman Spooner. He was succeeded for the 1863 session by Republican Samuel Pratt. In 1869 Latham was the Democratic nominee for Wisconsin's 12th State Senate district, losing with 1129 votes to 2235 for the same Samuel Pratt. In 1870, he was the nominee for the 2nd Walworth County Assembly district (the Towns of Linn, Geneva, Elkhorn, La Fayette, Bloomfield, Lyons and Spring Prairie), losing with 620 votes to 990 for Republican Amzy Merriam. In 1879 he ran as both the Democratic and Greenback Party nominee for what was now Walworth's renumbered 1st Assembly district, gaining 710 votes to 941 for Republican Ely Bruce Dewing.

Lemira L. Latham died July 25, 1885. Hollis died February 22, 1886, after several weeks' illness.
