= Perley J. Shumway =

American politician (1810–1863)

Perley J. Shumway (1810–1863) was an American blacksmith, farmer, pioneer and politician from Wauwatosa, Wisconsin.

Shumway was born in Worcester, Massachusetts in 1810 to a family descended from Frenchmen. He learned to blacksmith in Massachusetts before moving west, settling in Milford, Illinois. There Shumway farmed and met his wife, Mary Gibson. In 1842, he moved to Wauwatosa in the Wisconsin Territory, where he worked as the village blacksmith, farmed, and kept a tavern called the Wauwatosa House.

== Public office ==
Shumway was elected to the Wisconsin State Assembly for the 1st Wisconsin Legislature in 1848, from the Assembly district consisting of Wauwatosa, the Town of Lake and the Town of Milwaukee. In 1852, he was a major in the First Regiment of the First Division of the Wisconsin state militia (Milwaukee County); this was an elected position. In 1861 he was again elected to the Assembly as a Democrat, representing the 8th Milwaukee County district (Wauwatosa and Greenfield). He was assigned to the standing committee on Swamp and Overflowed Lands. He was succeeded for the 1863 session by fellow Democrat Edward Collins.

He was appointed jailor and deputy sheriff in Milwaukee County in 1863, and died later that year.

== Notes ==
This article incorporates text from the 1909 edition of Memoirs of Milwaukee County, by Jerome Anthony Watrous which is in the public domain in the United States.
