= Timothy D. Morris =

19th century American politician

Member of the Wisconsin Senate from the 7th district
- In office January 5, 1863 – January 2, 1865
- Preceded by: William L. Utley
- Succeeded by: Jerome Case

Sheriff of Racine County, Wisconsin
- In office January 1, 1857 – January 1, 1859
- Preceded by: James O. Bartlett
- Succeeded by: William G. Everit
- In office January 1, 1853 – January 1, 1855
- Preceded by: John A. Carswell
- Succeeded by: James O. Bartlett

Personal details
- Born: July 4, 1818 De Peyster, New York, U.S.
- Died: April 26, 1876 (aged 57) Caledonia, Wisconsin, U.S.
- Resting place: Mound Cemetery, Racine, Wisconsin
- Party: Republican; Whig (before 1854)
- Spouse: Ellen Maria Emerson (m. 1843–1876)
- Children: at least 8
- Occupation: Farmer

Timothy D. Morris (July 4, 1818 – April 26, 1876) was an American farmer, Republican politician, and Wisconsin pioneer. He was a member of the Wisconsin Senate, representing Racine County during the 1863 and 1864 sessions. He also served four years as sheriff of Racine County, and, in that capacity, played a significant role in the Joshua Glover affair in 1854. His name was often abbreviated as T. D. Morris in historical documents.

== Biography ==
Timothy Morris was born in the town of De Peyster, New York, in 1818.

He came to the Wisconsin Territory in the Fall of 1838 and established a claim in the town of Caledonia, in Racine County. His brother also came to Racine County and established a claim on a neighboring plot. The two of them collaborated to clear the first plot of farmland in this area of the county.

In 1852, he was elected sheriff of Racine County, running on the Whig Party ticket. During his second year as sheriff, a significant controversy arose from attempts by federal authorities to enforce the Fugitive Slave Act in Racine County in the case of Joshua Glover.

Glover had come to Racine via the Underground Railroad after escaping from slavery in the south. His presence in Racine became known, however, and his former captor, Bennami Garland, came north to reclaim him and return him to slavery. On the evening of March 10, 1854, Garland seized Glover with the assistance of the U.S. marshal, and Glover was taken from Racine and imprisoned in Milwaukee while his case was being heard. Morris, however, responded by using his authority as sheriff to try to arrest Garland and his assistants—including federal agents—on charges of kidnapping and assault.

The next day, other Racine abolitionists led a mob to protest at the jail in Milwaukee. Morris joined the protest that evening, taking another 100 Racinians by boat to Milwaukee. Within an hour of their arrival, the abolitionists stormed the jail with pickaxes and wood slabs. Morris arrested Garland at the Milwaukee jail and Glover was liberated. Garland ultimately sued in federal court and was ordered released. But by then, Glover had taken a boat to Canada and was beyond his reach.

Morris did not run for re-election in 1854, but was elected again in 1856, running on the ticket of the new Republican Party.

In 1862, he received the Republican Party nomination for Wisconsin Senate in the 7th State Senate district, over Philo Belden. He won the Fall general election and represented Racine County for two years in the Wisconsin Senate.

Morris died at his home in western Caledonia on April 26, 1876, after suffering from lung inflammation. He was interred at Racine's historic Mound Cemetery.

== Personal life and family ==
Timothy Morris married Ellen Maria Emerson, the daughter of Stillman Emerson, in 1843. The Emersons had come to Racine from Vermont, after a short time in New York state. Morris and his wife had at least seven sons and one daughter.

Wisconsin Senate
Preceded by William L. Utley	Member of the Wisconsin Senate from the 7th district January 5, 1863 – January 2, 1865	Succeeded by Jerome Case
Legal offices
Preceded by John A. Carswell	Sheriff of Racine County, Wisconsin; January 1, 1853 – January 1, 1855	Succeeded by James O. Bartlett
Preceded by James O. Bartlett	Sheriff of Racine County, Wisconsin; January 1, 1857 – January 1, 1859	Succeeded by William G. Everit
