= Edwin H. Galloway =

19th century American politician

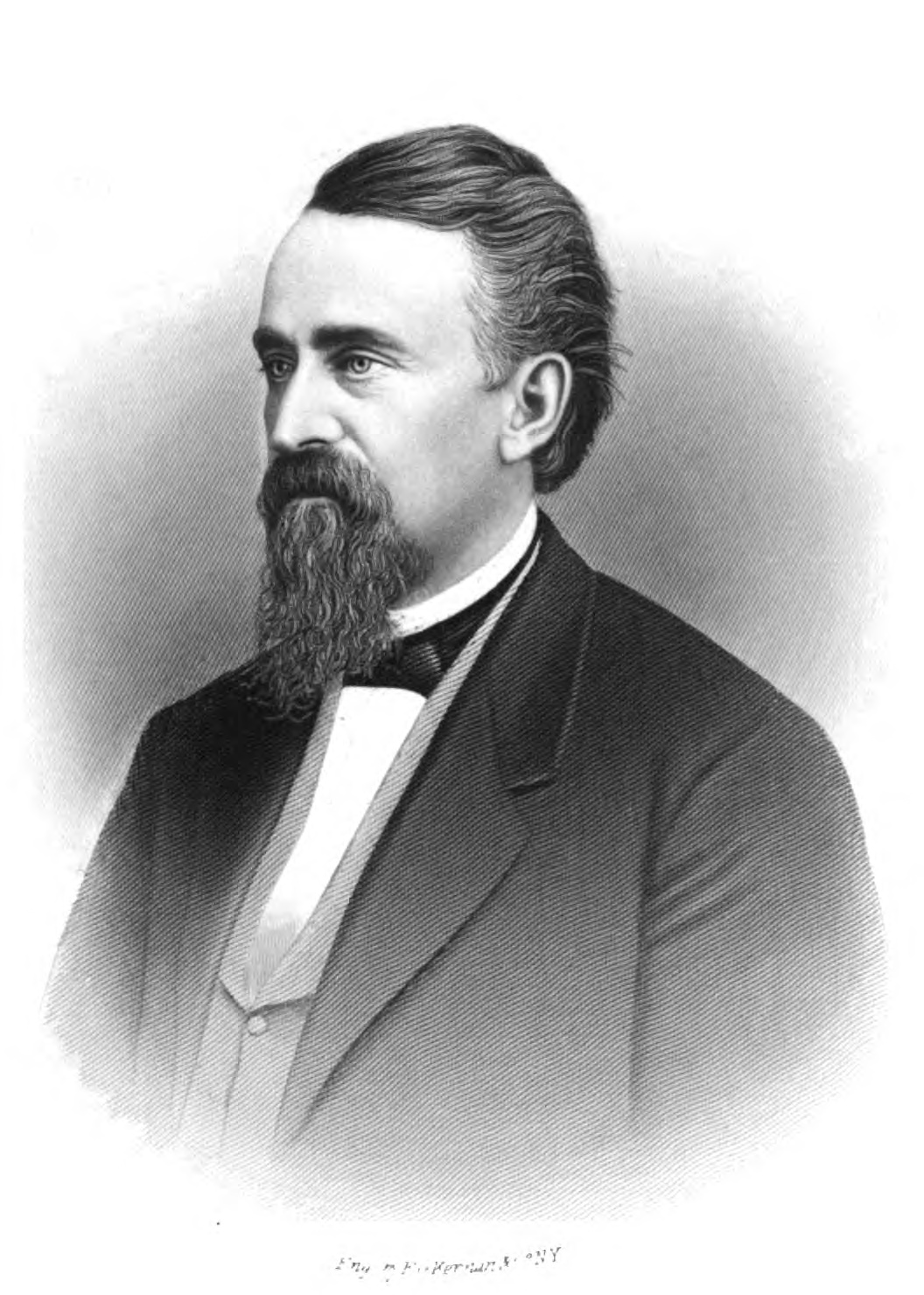
- From Portrait and biographical album of Fond du Lac County, Wisconsin (1889)

9th Mayor of Fond du Lac, Wisconsin
- In office April 1860 – April 1861
- Preceded by: John Potter
- Succeeded by: Jared M. Taylor

Member of the Wisconsin State Assembly from the Fond du Lac 3rd district
- In office January 5, 1863 – January 2, 1865
- Preceded by: Campbell McLean
- Succeeded by: James Sawyer

Personal details
- Born: April 12, 1825 Harrisburg, New York, U.S.
- Died: May 7, 1876 (aged 51) Fond du Lac, Wisconsin, U.S.
- Resting place: Rienzi Cemetery, Fond du Lac
- Party: Republican
- Spouse: Maria Henrietta Adams (m. 1849–1876)
- Children: Alice G. (Shepard)^{(b. 1850; died 1935)}; Florence L. (Knapp)^{(b. 1852; died 1929)}; Charles J. Galloway^{(b. 1853; died 1854)}; Jennie S. (Moore)^{(b. 1855; died 1931)}; Edwin Adams Galloway^{(b. 1857; died 1926)}

Edwin Henry Galloway (April 12, 1825 – May 7, 1876) was an American businessman, Republican politician, and Wisconsin pioneer. He was the 9th mayor of Fond du Lac, Wisconsin, and served two terms in the Wisconsin State Assembly, representing Fond du Lac County.

== Biography ==
Edwin Galloway was born in Lewis County, New York, in 1825. He was raised on his father's farm and attended the district schools in that area. He finished his studies at the Lowville Academy, in Lowville, New York. After his education, he was hired as a clerk in a general store and worked there for two years. In the Summer of 1848, he moved west to the new state of Wisconsin, and settled at Fond du Lac.

He established a farmstead and invested in real estate and land in Fond du Lac, which at the time was just a small settlement with a handful of buildings. He then became involved in the lumber trade, which was his principle business interest through the 1850s and 1860s.

He became involved in local affairs and politics and was elected mayor of Fond du Lac in 1860. He also served as city treasurer, and was chairman of the Fond du Lac County board of supervisors. In 1862, he was elected to the Wisconsin State Assembly from Fond du Lac County's 3rd Assembly district, running on the Republican Party ticket. He was re-elected in 1863, and served in the 16th and 17th Wisconsin legislatures.

He retired from his lumber business in 1866 due to poor health. He subsequently became a major shareholder and manager of the Fond du Lac Savings Bank. He eventually became vice president of the bank, and held that position until his death in 1876.

He died at his home in Fond du Lac after a long illness.

== Personal life and family ==
Edwin Galloway was a son of Charles and Anna (née Moore) Galloway. Charles and Anna were married in England and emigrated to the United States in 1819. Edwin's younger brother, Charles A. Galloway, became the 22nd mayor of Fond du Lac.

Edwin Galloway married Maria Henrietta Adams on October 30, 1849. Maria Adams was a native of Lowville, New York. The Galloways had five children, though one died in infancy. Their only surviving son, Edwin A. Galloway, inherited and continued the family farm.

Wisconsin State Assembly
Preceded by Campbell McLean	Member of the Wisconsin State Assembly from the Fond du Lac 3rd district January 5, 1863 – January 2, 1865	Succeeded by James Sawyer
Political offices
Preceded by John Potter	Mayor of Fond du Lac, Wisconsin; April 1860 – April 1861	Succeeded by Jared M. Taylor
