= Charles Œtling =

American politician (1810–1879)

Charles Œtling [sometimes spelled Oetling] (September 11, 1810 – March 15, 1879) was an American farmer and politician from Herman, Wisconsin.

Born in the Kingdom of Hanover, Œtling received a common education, and became a farmer. He emigrated to the United States in 1844, settling first in New York City and then, in 1847, settled in what would become Section 26 of the town of Herman in Sheboygan County, Wisconsin. His son, born in August 1847, was the first boy born to a settler family in that town; and in 1848, the first school in Herman was taught in his home.

== Public service ==
When the Town of Herman was formally organized in 1850, Œtling was elected town chairman (equivalent to mayor, and ex officio a member of the county board of supervisors). He became a justice of the peace around 1852, and served as an enrolling office during the American Civil War. In 1862, he was elected from the 2nd Sheboygan County Assembly district (the Towns of Herman, Lima and Sheboygan Falls) for the 16th Wisconsin Legislature of 1863, as a Democrat, succeeding fellow Democrat John E. Thomas. He was assigned to the standing committee on engrossed bills.

In 1870, Œtling was again elected to the Assembly from the new 1st Sheboygan County district (the Towns of Herman, Moselle, Sheboygan, & Wilson, and the City of Sheboygan) for the 24th Wisconsin Legislature of 1871, with 986 votes to 756 for Republican Julius Bodenstab. He was assigned to the committee on internal improvements. He was succeeded the next year by fellow Democrat George W. Weeden.
