= John E. Thomas (politician) =

American politician (1829–1910)

Member of the Wisconsin Senate from the 1st district
- In office January 1, 1863 – January 1, 1865
- Preceded by: Luther H. Cary
- Succeeded by: John A. Bentley

Member of the Wisconsin State Assembly from the Sheboygan 2nd district
- In office January 6, 1862 – January 5, 1863
- Preceded by: John Bredemeyer
- Succeeded by: Charles Oetling

Chairman of the Board of Supervisors of Sheboygan County, Wisconsin
- In office 1874–1876
- Preceded by: George W. Weeden
- Succeeded by: Samuel Decius Hubbard

Personal details
- Born: November 27, 1829 Rensselaer County, New York, U.S.
- Died: April 14, 1910 (aged 80) St. Nicholas Hospital, Sheboygan, Wisconsin, U.S.
- Resting place: Sheboygan Falls Cemetery, Sheboygan Falls, Wisconsin
- Party: Democratic; Greenback (1880–1884); Union Labor (1886)
- Spouse: Clara Ann Waring Cole (m. 1853; died 1904)
- Children: Mary Elizabeth (Robinson)^{(b. 1854; died 1933)}; Steadman Thomas^{(b. 1856; died 1934)}; William Cole Thomas^{(b. 1859; died 1923)}; Charles H. Thomas^{(b. 1861; died 1914)}; Mattie Bolle (Hertzberg)^{(b. 1866; died 1947)}; Harry Edmund Thomas^{(b. 1868; died 1953)}
- Occupation: Lawyer, public administrator, and politician

John Edmund Thomas (November 27, 1829 – April 14, 1910) was an American lawyer, public administrator, and populist politician. He served two years in the Wisconsin Senate (1863, 1864) and one year in the Wisconsin State Assembly (1862), elected on the Democratic Party ticket and representing Sheboygan County. Later he ran for Congress on the Greenback Party ticket, and later ran for state attorney general on the Union Labor Party ticket.

== Early life ==
Thomas was born in Rensselaer County, New York, in 1829. At age four, his family relocated to Livingston County, then to Genesee County, New York, where he gained his common school education. His family's wealth was decimated by the Panic of 1837 and, at age 16, Thomas moved to Lockport, New York, took a job as a merchant, and continued his studies.

He moved to Sheboygan Falls, Wisconsin, in 1849, where he married his wife, Clara A. W. Cole. He continued his business pursuits until 1856, when he began studying law. He was admitted to the bar in 1858 and began practicing law. He later became President of the Dairyman's Bank and for some time was owner and editor of the Sheboygan County News.

== Career ==
He was elected to represent Sheboygan Falls and northeastern Sheboygan County in the Wisconsin Assembly for the 1862 session. The next year, he was elected to represent all of Sheboygan County for 1863 and 1864 in the Wisconsin Senate. He was a Democrat.

In the Senate, he was Chair of the Select Committee to consider liability and compensation for victims of the so-called "Ozaukee Riot," and recommended in favor of recognizing the legality and paying the claimants from the state treasury (1863 Wisconsin Act 211). He also authored a bill to appropriate funding to the Governor and empower him to locate veterans at various hospitals around the country who had been wounded in the ongoing Civil War, and attempt to return them to Wisconsin to recuperate (1863 Wisconsin Act 196).

After leaving office, he conducted a successful law practice in Sheboygan County. He served on the County Board, was a member of the Board of Regents of the Normal School for six years, was a member of the local school board, and was town and county superintendent of schools. He was Secretary of the County Agricultural Society and Horticulture Society, and was Village President. He was also a prominent Mason.

== Third-party activity ==
In 1880, he was the Greenback Party nominee for Wisconsin's 5th congressional district, receiving 1,188 votes to 16,984 for Democratic incumbent Edward S. Bragg and 14,753 for Republican Elihu Colman. He was again the nominee in 1882, receiving 764 votes to 12,933 for Democrat Joseph Rankin; 6,108 for Republican Levi Howland and 813 for Prohibitionist R. L. Wing.

In 1886, Thomas was the candidate of the Union Labor party, also called the "People's Party", for Attorney General of Wisconsin. He won 21,740 votes to 131,358 votes for Democrat Charles Estabrook; 115,949 for Democrat George W. Bird, and 17,247 votes for Prohibitionist E. W. Chafin. In 1888, he was their original nominee for Railroad Commissioner, but in the wake of a dispute over electoral fusion, he apparently withdrew his candidacy, as another candidate was on the ballot in November.

Thomas rejoined the Democratic Party in 1890, but then joined the Populist Party in the mid 1890s, running for district attorney in 1894 on the Populist ticket. He became an ardent supporter of the free silver movement, and was a delegate to the 1896 Populist National Convention in St. Louis, which endorsed Democratic nominee William Jennings Bryan.

== Later years ==
Thomas died April 14, 1910, at St. Nicholas Hospital in Sheboygan, after a long illness. By that time, he was the oldest member of the Sheboygan legal profession.
