= Hope House (Easton, Maryland) =

Historic house in Maryland, United States

- U.S. National Register of Historic Places
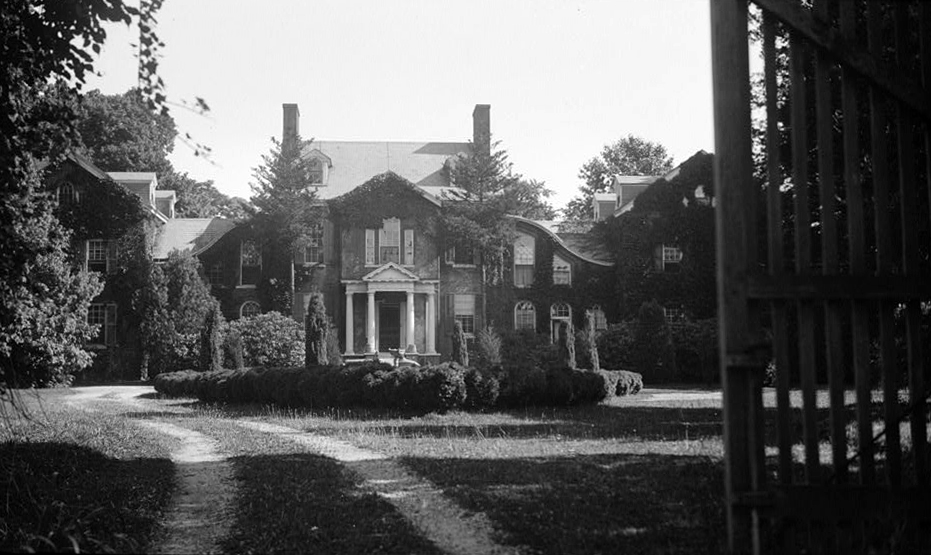

- Location within Maryland Location within the United States
- Location: Northwest of Easton, northeast of Voit Rd., and 0.8 miles northwest of the bridge at Tunis Mill, near Easton, Maryland
- Coordinates: 38°50′1″N 76°11′10″W
- Area: 76 acres (31 ha)
- Built: 1740
- Built by: Starr, Mr.
- NRHP reference No.: 79001143
- Added to NRHP: November 1, 1979

Hope House is a historic home located near Easton, Talbot County, Maryland. It was listed on the National Register of Historic Places in 1979.

== About ==
It is a seven-part brick mansion in which the central block is the original, Federal portion, built about 1800. The hyphens, wings, and additions were built during the first decade of the 20th century to replace earlier hyphens and wings. It was home to members of the Tilghman and Lloyd families. Later it was occupied by the Starr family and Ruth Starr Rose in 1906, and remodeled a year later in 1907.
