= Smith S. Wilkinson =

American politician (1824–1889)

President pro tempore of the Wisconsin Senate
- In office January 4, 1864 – January 2, 1865
- Preceded by: Wyman Spooner
- Succeeded by: Willard H. Chandler

Member of the Wisconsin Senate from the 14th district
- In office January 6, 1862 – January 1, 1866
- Preceded by: Charles R. Gill
- Succeeded by: Argalus Starks

Personal details
- Born: December 7, 1824 Elbridge, New York, U.S.
- Died: April 9, 1889
- Resting place: Oakwood Cemetery, Adrian, Michigan
- Party: Republican; Natl. Union (1864–1867)
- Spouse: Helen M. Tabor (died 1910)

Smith S. Wilkinson (December 7, 1824 – April 9, 1889) was an American lawyer and Republican politician. He served four years in the Wisconsin State Senate and was President pro tempore of the Wisconsin Senate for the 1864 session.

== Biography ==
Wilkinson was born December 7, 1824, in Elbridge, New York, to Shubael Wilkinson and Mahala Smith. He married Helen M. Tabor, became a lawyer and raised a family in Prairie du Lac, Wisconsin, (now Milton). Wilkinson represented the 14th State Senate district during the 1862, 1863, 1864 and 1865 sessions and was President pro tempore of the Senate for the 1864 session. He was a Republican and was affiliated with the National Union Party during the American Civil War. He died on April 9, 1889, and is buried in Adrian, Michigan.

Wisconsin Senate
Preceded by Charles R. Gill	Member of the Wisconsin Senate from the 14th district January 6, 1862 – January 1, 1866	Succeeded by Argalus Starks
Preceded by Wyman Spooner	President pro tempore of the Wisconsin Senate; January 4, 1864 – January 2, 1865	Succeeded by Willard H. Chandler
