= William W. Field =

American politician (1824–1907)

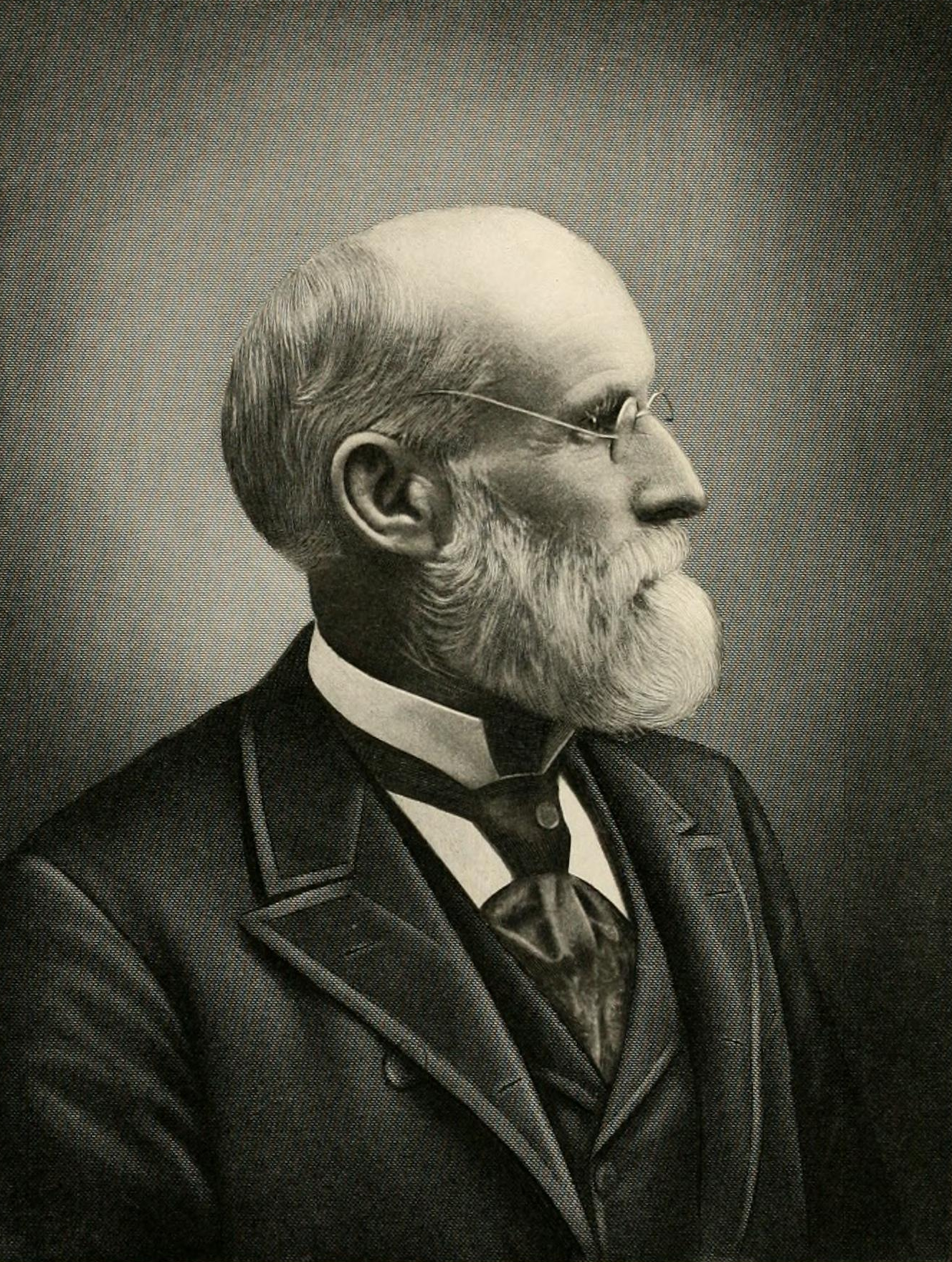

16th Speaker of the Wisconsin Assembly
- In office January 13, 1864 – January 10, 1866
- Preceded by: J. Allen Barber
- Succeeded by: Henry D. Barron

Member of the Wisconsin State Assembly from the Grant 4th district
- In office January 1, 1871 – January 1, 1872
- Preceded by: Hugh A. W. McNair
- Succeeded by: Jerome B. Cory
- In office January 1, 1862 – January 1, 1866
- Preceded by: John G. Clark
- Succeeded by: George H. Washburn

Member of the Wisconsin State Assembly from the Grant 4th district
- In office January 1, 1855 – January 1, 1856
- Preceded by: William Jeffery
- Succeeded by: Joseph T. Mills

Member of the Grant County Board of Supervisors
- In office 1855, 1861, 1870, 1871

Personal details
- Born: William Wells Field; October 31, 1824 Lancaster, New Hampshire, U.S.
- Died: April 5, 1907 (aged 82) Sac County, Iowa, U.S.
- Resting place: Odebolt Cemetery, Odebolt, Iowa
- Party: Republican; Union (1864-1865)
- Spouse: Mahala Jane Howe (m. 1850–1907)
- Children: 2

William Wells Field (October 31, 1824 – April 5, 1907) was an American farmer and politician. He was the 16th speaker of the Wisconsin State Assembly and served a total of six years in the Assembly, representing Grant County. In historical documents he is frequently referred to as W. W. Field.

== Early life and family ==
William Wells Field was born in the town of Lancaster, New Hampshire, one of six children born to Abel Waite Field and his wife, Sally. He is a descendant of William Field, an early settler at the Massachusetts Bay Colony. His contemporaries Marshall Field and Cyrus Field were distant cousins.

Field's father was a farmer and paid for his education at the Lancaster Academy. After finishing his education, Field taught for three years, then moved to Medford, Massachusetts, in 1845, where he worked as a farm laborer. After two years of farm labor, he relocated to Belfast, Maine, where he worked in the marble trade. He married Mahala Jane Howe on October 31, 1850.

In 1852, they traveled west to Wisconsin and purchased a tract of land in Fenniman, in Grant County.

== Wisconsin career ==
Shortly after arriving in Grant County, Field was elected to the Grant County Board of Supervisors, where he served at least four years. In 1854, he was elected to his first term in the Wisconsin State Assembly, serving as one of the first elected Republicans in the state legislature.

During the American Civil War, Field was a vocal proponent of the Union cause. He was returned to the Assembly in 1862, and was re-elected to the 1863, 1864, and 1865 sessions, serving as Speaker in the 1864 and 1865 sessions, when he presided over the National Union Party majority. He was a presidential elector for Abraham Lincoln in the 1864 United States presidential election.

After 1865, he rented his farm and relocated to Boscobel, Wisconsin, and, in 1873, moved to Madison. He was one of the incorporators of the Oshkosh and Mississippi Railroad Company and the Military Ridge and Grant County Railroad Company. In 1871 he was appointed a regent of the University of Wisconsin, and he served on the State Agricultural Society and was secretary of the State Board of Centennial Managers. In 1875, Field worked to secure the upset victory of Angus Cameron over incumbent Republican Senator Matthew H. Carpenter, with the assistance of Democratic votes in the Wisconsin Legislature.

== Iowa career ==
In 1879, Field left Wisconsin for Iowa. He bought a large tract of land in Wheeler Township, in Sac County, and developed the land until 1892. At that point he relocated to the town of Odebolt. He was one of the founders of the First National Bank of Odebolt, and was the first president of the bank. He also served as vice president and president of Iowa's State Agricultural Society. He was an advocate for the farmers of the state and worked to expand the adoption of improved farming methods.

== Death ==
William Field died in April 1907, in Sac County.

Wisconsin State Assembly
| Preceded by William Jeffrey | Member of the Wisconsin State Assembly from the Grant 4th district January 1, 1855 – January 1, 1856 | Succeeded by Joseph Mills |
| Preceded by John Clark | Member of the Wisconsin State Assembly from the Grant 4th district January 1, 1862 – January 1, 1866 | Succeeded by George H. Washburn |
| Preceded by Hugh A. W. McNair | Member of the Wisconsin State Assembly from the Grant 4th district January 1, 1871 – January 1, 1872 | Succeeded by Jerome B. Cory |
| Preceded by J. Allen Barber | Speaker of the Wisconsin State Assembly; January 13, 1864 – January 10, 1866 | Succeeded by Henry D. Barron |
