= George E. Albee =

United States Army Medal of Honor recipient (1845–1918)

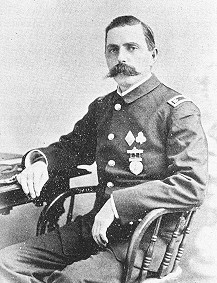
- Albee while serving as Major and Brigade Inspector of the Connecticut National Guard, 1892.
- Born: January 27, 1845; Lisbon, New Hampshire, U.S.
- Died: March 24, 1918 (aged 73); Laurel, Maryland, U.S.
- Burial place: Arlington National Cemetery
- Military career
- Allegiance: United States
- Branch: United States Army; Connecticut Army National Guard
- Service years: 1862, 1863–1878 (Army)
- Rank: Captain (Army); Major (National Guard)
- Units: Berdan's Sharpshooters, 3rd Wisconsin Light Artillery, 36th Wisconsin Infantry, 36th United States Colored Infantry, 41st U.S. Infantry, 24th U.S. Infantry, Connecticut National Guard
- Conflicts: American Civil War; Indian Wars
- Awards: Medal of Honor

George Emerson Albee (January 27, 1845 – March 24, 1918) was an officer in the United States Army who received the Medal of Honor for his actions during the Indian Wars. During the Civil War, he fought with Berdan's Sharpshooters, the Wisconsin light artillery, the U.S. Colored Infantry, and the U.S. Regular Army.

== Biography ==
George Albee was born in Lisbon, New Hampshire, on January 27, 1845. He died March 24, 1918, in Laurel, Maryland, and is buried in Arlington National Cemetery. His grave is located in Section 2, Lot 850. His wife, Mary Hawes Albee (1848–1907), is buried with him. Albee enlisted in Company G (Wisconsin), Berdan's Sharpshooters in June 1862. After two months in the field he was wounded at the Second Battle of Bull Run and discharged for disability while convalescing. He later enlisted in 1863 as an artilleryman in the 3rd Wisconsin Light Artillery but was discharged to accept a commission as 2nd lieutenant in the 36th Wisconsin Infantry; he was later promoted to 1st lieutenant. After the Civil War Albee served as a lieutenant in the 36th United States Colored Infantry (1866), 41st U.S. Infantry (1866–1869), 24th U.S. Infantry (1869–1878). He retired from the US Army in 1878, and later became captain of the "National Blues" Company D 2nd Regiment Connecticut National Guard in 1891. Shortly thereafter, Albee was promoted to major and Brigade Inspector of Rifle Practice of the Connecticut National Guard.

== Medal of Honor citation ==
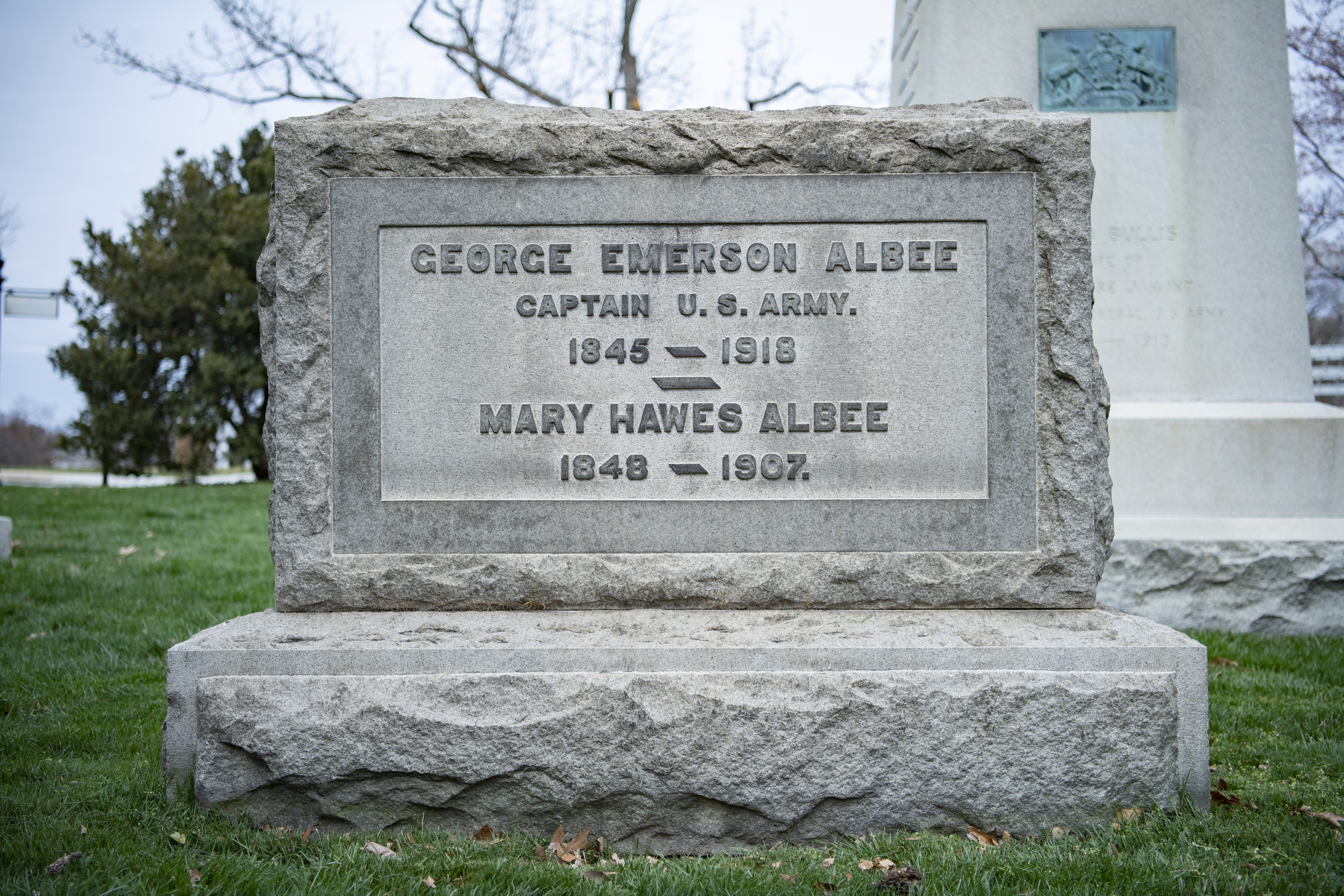
Grave at Arlington National Cemetery

Rank and organization: First Lieutenant, 41st U.S. Infantry. Place and date: At Brazos River, Tex., October 28, 1869. Entered service at: Owatonna, Minn. Birth: Lisbon, N.H. Date of issue: January 18, 1894.

Citation:

Attacked with 2 men a force of 11 Indians, drove them from the hills, and reconnoitered the country beyond.

== See also ==
- List of Medal of Honor recipients
- List of Medal of Honor recipients for the Indian Wars
