= Noah Virgin =

Wisconsin pioneer

Noah H. Virgin

Member of the Wisconsin Senate from the 16th district
- In office January 4, 1858 – January 6, 1862
- Preceded by: J. Allen Barber
- Succeeded by: Milas K. Young

Member of the Wisconsin State Assembly
- In office January 1, 1855 – January 7, 1856
- Preceded by: Edward Estabrook
- Succeeded by: James T. Brown
- Constituency: Grant 3rd district
- In office June 5, 1848 – January 1, 1849
- Preceded by: Position established
- Succeeded by: James Russell Vineyard
- Constituency: Grant 2nd district

Member of the House of Representatives of the Wisconsin Territory from Grant County
- In office February 7, 1848 – May 29, 1848 Serving with Daniel Raymond Burt
- Preceded by: Armstead C. Brown & William Richardson
- Succeeded by: Position abolished

Personal details
- Born: December 6, 1812 Fayette County, Pennsylvania, U.S.
- Died: December 7, 1892 (aged 80) Racine, Wisconsin, U.S.
- Resting place: Hillside Cemetery, Platteville, Wisconsin
- Party: Democratic (after 1864); Republican (1854–1864); Whig (before 1854)
- Spouse: Permelia E. Weed (m. 1839; died 1884)
- Children: Horatio H. Virgin^{(b. 1840; died 1913)}; Emma (Laughton)^{(b. 1847; died 1922)}; Mary (Laughton)^{(b. 1851; died 1929)}; N. Daniel Webster Virgin^{(b. 1857; died 1865)}; Eugene Virgin; 3 others
- Occupation: millwright, merchant

Noah Hyatt Virgin (December 6, 1812 – December 7, 1892) was an American grain merchant, politician, and Wisconsin pioneer. He was an early settler at Platteville, Wisconsin, and represented Grant County in the Wisconsin State Senate (1858–1862), State Assembly (1848, 1855), and the Territorial Assembly (prior to statehood).

== Biography ==
Virgin was born on December 6, 1812, in Fayette County, Pennsylvania. He moved to Platteville, Wisconsin, in 1835. In 1839, he married Pamelia E. Adams. They had eight children, including Horatio Hyatt Virgin (1840–1913), who became a colonel in the Union Army during the American Civil War.

== Career ==
Virgin was Commissioner of Grant County, Wisconsin, and a member of the Wisconsin Territorial Legislature. He was a member of the Assembly in 1848 and 1855 and served two consecutive terms in the Senate. In 1857, he was appointed to the new state Board of Regents for Normal Schools.

Originally a member of the Whig Party, Virgin was a Republican from 1854 until the re-election of Abraham Lincoln in 1864. Virgin later became a member of the Democratic Party. In 1866, he was a candidate for the United States House of Representatives from Wisconsin's 3rd congressional district. He lost to incumbent Amasa Cobb. He died on December 7, 1892, in Racine, Wisconsin.
