= Copperville, Carroll County, Maryland =

Unincorporated community in Maryland, United States

Copperville, Maryland
- Unincorporated community
- Location within Maryland
- Coordinates: 39°38′02″N 77°09′13″W
- Country: United States
- State: Maryland
- County: Carroll
- Elevation: 502 ft (153 m)
- Time zone: UTC-5 (Eastern (EST))
  - Summer (DST): UTC-4 (EDT)
- Area codes: 410 & 443
- GNIS feature ID: 590020

Copperville is an unincorporated community in Carroll County, Maryland, United States. Copperville is located 2 miles (3.2 km) southeast of Taneytown.
