= Newton Littlejohn =

19th century American politician, Wisconsin State Senate

Member of the Wisconsin Senate from the 12th district
- In office January 1, 1864 – January 1, 1870
- Preceded by: Wyman Spooner
- Succeeded by: Samuel Pratt

Personal details
- Born: July 23, 1823 Litchfield, New York
- Died: February 27, 1916 (aged 92)
- Resting place: Hillside Cemetery; Whitewater, Wisconsin
- Party: Republican; National Union (1864-1867)
- Spouse(s): Jane Sophia Newton (died 1902)
- Children: Jessie (Halverson)^{(b. 1860; died 1933)}; Ernest N. Littlejohn^{(b. 1866; died 1936)}

Newton Moore Littlejohn (July 23, 1823 – February 27, 1916) was an American politician and member of the Wisconsin State Senate from 1864 to 1870. A Republican, he represented Walworth County.

== Biography ==
Littlejohn was born on July 23, 1823, in Litchfield, New York. On September 8, 1848, he married Jane Sophia Newton. They had two children. Littlejohn died on February 27, 1916, and was buried in Whitewater, Wisconsin.

== Career ==
Littlejohn represented the 12th District in the Senate from 1864 to 1870. He was elected in 1863 on the National Union Party ticket, created in the midst of the American Civil War. He continued as a Republican after the war. Previously, he had been elected Chairman of Whitewater (town), Wisconsin in 1861.

Wisconsin Senate
Preceded by Wyman Spooner	Member of the Wisconsin Senate from the 12th district 1864 – 1870	Succeeded by Samuel Pratt
