= Edward Collins (Wisconsin politician) =

American politician

Edward Collins was a farmer from Root Creek, Wisconsin who served a single one-year term in the 1863 session of the Wisconsin House of Representatives, representing the 8th Milwaukee County district (the towns of Wauwatosa and Greenfield). At the time of his service, he was 46 years old, and had been in Wisconsin 22 years. He was a native of Ireland. He was assigned to the standing committee on State Lands. He succeeded fellow Democrat Perley J. Shumway; and was succeeded in the 1864 session by former State Senator Edward McGarry, another Democrat and native of Ireland.
