= Edward McGarry (Wisconsin politician) =

19th century American politician

4th Prison Commissioner of Wisconsin
- In office January 7, 1856 – January 4, 1858
- Governor: William A. Barstow; Arthur MacArthur Sr. Coles Bashford
- Preceded by: Argalus Starks
- Succeeded by: Edward M. McGraw

Member of the Wisconsin Senate from the 6th district
- In office January 2, 1854 – January 7, 1856
- Preceded by: Duncan Reed
- Succeeded by: Edward O'Neill

Member of the Wisconsin State Assembly from the Milwaukee 8th district
- In office January 4, 1864 – January 2, 1865
- Preceded by: Edward Collins
- Succeeded by: John W. Weiler

Member of the Wisconsin State Assembly from the Milwaukee 3rd district
- In office January 3, 1853 – January 2, 1854
- Preceded by: Wallace W. Graham
- Succeeded by: Edward O'Neill
- In office January 7, 1850 – January 6, 1851
- Preceded by: Julius White
- Succeeded by: John L. Doran

Personal details
- Born: July 5, 1817 County Down, Ireland, UK
- Died: May 17, 1899 (aged 81) Milwaukee, Wisconsin, U.S.
- Resting place: Calvary Cemetery, Milwaukee
- Party: Democratic

Edward McGarry (July 5, 1817 – May 17, 1899) was an Irish American immigrant, house painter, and Democratic politician, and a pioneer settler of Milwaukee, Wisconsin. He served as the 4th Wisconsin prison commissioner (at that time an elected position), and represented Milwaukee County for five years in the Wisconsin State Senate and State Assembly.

== Background ==
McGarry was born in County Down, Ireland, on July 5, 1817. He received what his official biography would describe vaguely as "a good education," and went into business in Liverpool as an inspector of cargo ships. He emigrated to the United States in 1841, and came to Milwaukee in 1847, where he worked with his brother in the housepainting business.

== Legislative and other public service ==
McGarry served as a member of the Assembly in 1850 and 1853 and spent two years (1854-1855) in the Senate representing the 6th Senate district as successor to fellow Democrat Duncan Reed.

He served a year as deputy warden of the state prison at Waupun, and was elected state prison commissioner, which was also warden of the State Prison (at that time a partisan elected position) in 1855 on the Democratic ticket, serving from January 7, 1856, to January 4, 1858, in that position. His Senate seat was taken by fellow Democrat Edward O'Neill.

He returned for a one-year Assembly term in 1864 from the 8th Milwaukee Assembly district (Wauwatosa and Greenfield), succeeding Edward Collins (also a native of Ireland). He was not re-elected, but he was succeeded by John Weiler, who (like Collins and McGarry) was a Democrat.

== Milwaukee County House of Correction ==
Because of his experience gained in the prison he was called to organize the Milwaukee County House of Correction (he had been interested in getting the law passed that organized the institution, and was instrumental in framing the rules for its management) and served as its "Inspector" (chief jailer) for about a year and a half. He quoted Dr. Johnson as saying, "Knock a man down and reason with him afterwards."

== Death ==
He died May 17, 1899, in Milwaukee.
