= Willard H. Chandler =

American politician (1830–1901)

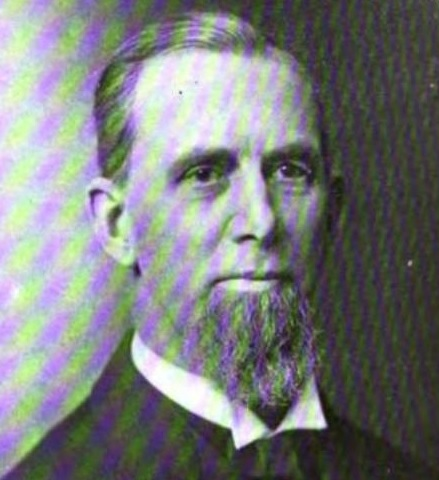
- From 1901's Transactions of the Wisconsin Academy of Sciences, Arts, and Letters

President pro tempore of the Wisconsin Senate
- In office January 2, 1865 – January 7, 1867
- Preceded by: Smith S. Wilkinson
- Succeeded by: George F. Wheeler

Member of the Wisconsin Senate from the 11th district
- In office January 5, 1863 – January 7, 1867
- Preceded by: Samuel C. Bean
- Succeeded by: Clement Warner

Member of the Wisconsin State Assembly from the Dane 2nd district
- In office January 3, 1870 – January 2, 1871
- Preceded by: Knudt Nelson
- Succeeded by: Knudt O. Heimdal
- In office January 7, 1861 – January 5, 1863
- Preceded by: Eleazor Grover Jr.
- Succeeded by: William H. Miller

Personal details
- Born: November 18, 1830 Brattleboro, Vermont, U.S.
- Died: March 24, 1901 (aged 70) Burke, Wisconsin, U.S.
- Resting place: Windsor Congregational Cemetery, Windsor, Wisconsin
- Party: Republican; Natl. Union (1864–1867)
- Spouses: Lucinda J. Wellman (m. 1854; died 1893); Harriet Adelaide Salisbury (m. 1895; died 1898)
- Children: Arthur G. Chandler^{(b. 1856; died 1876)}; Frances Augusta (Thompson)^{(b. 1860; died 1939)}; Gertrude Eva Chandler^{(b. 1864; died 1865)}

Willard Harris Chandler (November 18, 1830 – March 24, 1901) was an American educator, farmer, and Republican politician. He served in the Wisconsin State Senate and Assembly, and was President pro tempore of the Wisconsin Senate for the 1865 and 1866 sessions.

== Biography ==
Chandler was born on November 18, 1830, in Brattleboro, Vermont. He married Lucinda Wellman (1830–1893) in 1854 and they moved to Wisconsin that same year. They first settled in Darien, then relocated to Windsor, before moving to a farm in Burke, near Sun Prairie in 1869. After the death of his first wife, he married Harriet Adelaide Salisbury (1845–1898) in 1895. Chandler died at his farm on March 24, 1901.

== Career ==
Chandler held a variety of local offices, including town and county school superintendent, and county supervisor. He was a member of the Assembly from 1861 to 1862 and again in 1870. He was elected to the Senate in 1863, where he eventually became president pro tem. He was the Republican nominee for state superintendent of education in 1892, coming in second with 169,739 votes to 176,666 for the incumbent, Democrat Oliver Elwin Wells; 13,258 for Prohibitionist L. Wesley Underwood; and 9,784 for Populist Charles Hatch.

Party political offices
Preceded by Lorenzo D. Harvey	Republican nominee for Superintendent of Public Instruction of Wisconsin; 1892	Succeeded by John Q. Emery
Wisconsin State Assembly
Preceded by Eleazor Grover Jr.	Member of the Wisconsin State Assembly from the Dane 2nd district January 7, 1861 – January 5, 1863	Succeeded by William H. Miller
Preceded by Knudt Nelson	Member of the Wisconsin State Assembly from the Dane 2nd district January 3, 1870 – January 2, 1871	Succeeded by Knudt O. Heimdal
Wisconsin Senate
Preceded by Samuel C. Bean	Member of the Wisconsin Senate from the 11th district January 5, 1863 – January 7, 1867	Succeeded by Clement Warner
Preceded by Smith S. Wilkinson	President pro tempore of the Wisconsin Senate; January 2, 1865 – January 7, 1867	Succeeded by George F. Wheeler
