= Carl Zillier =

American politician

Carl Zillier (April 18, 1838 – April 15, 1914) was an American newspaper editor and politician.

Born in Halberstadt, Prussia. Zillier emigrated with his parents to the United States in 1849 and settled, on a farm, in the town of Sheboygan, Sheboygan County, Wisconsin. Zillier learned the printing trade and in 1857 started the National Demokrat a German language newspaper. In 1863, 1864, and in 1913, Zillier served in the Wisconsin State Assembly and was a Democrat. In 1870, Zillier was elected Sheboygan County clerk. He also served on the Sheboygan County Board of Supervisors and was chairman of the county board. In 1886 and 1895, President Grover Cleveland appointed Zillier postmaster of Sheboygan, Wisconsin. Zillier died in Sheboygan, Wisconsin as a result of a broken hip.
