= Copperville, Talbot County, Maryland =

Unincorporated community in Maryland, United States

Copperville, Maryland
- Unincorporated community
- Location within Maryland Location within the United States
- Coordinates: 38°49′29″N 76°10′15″W
- Country: United States
- State: Maryland
- County: Talbot
- Elevation: 10 ft (3.0 m)
- Time zone: UTC-5 (Eastern (EST))
  - Summer (DST): UTC-4 (EDT)
- Area codes: 410 & 443
- GNIS feature ID: 590019

Copperville is an unincorporated community in Talbot County, Maryland, United States. Copperville is located on the northeast bank of Leeds Creek, 6.2 miles (10.0 km) west-northwest of Easton.
