= Wyman Spooner =

American lawyer and politician (1795–1877)

The Honorable Wyman Spooner
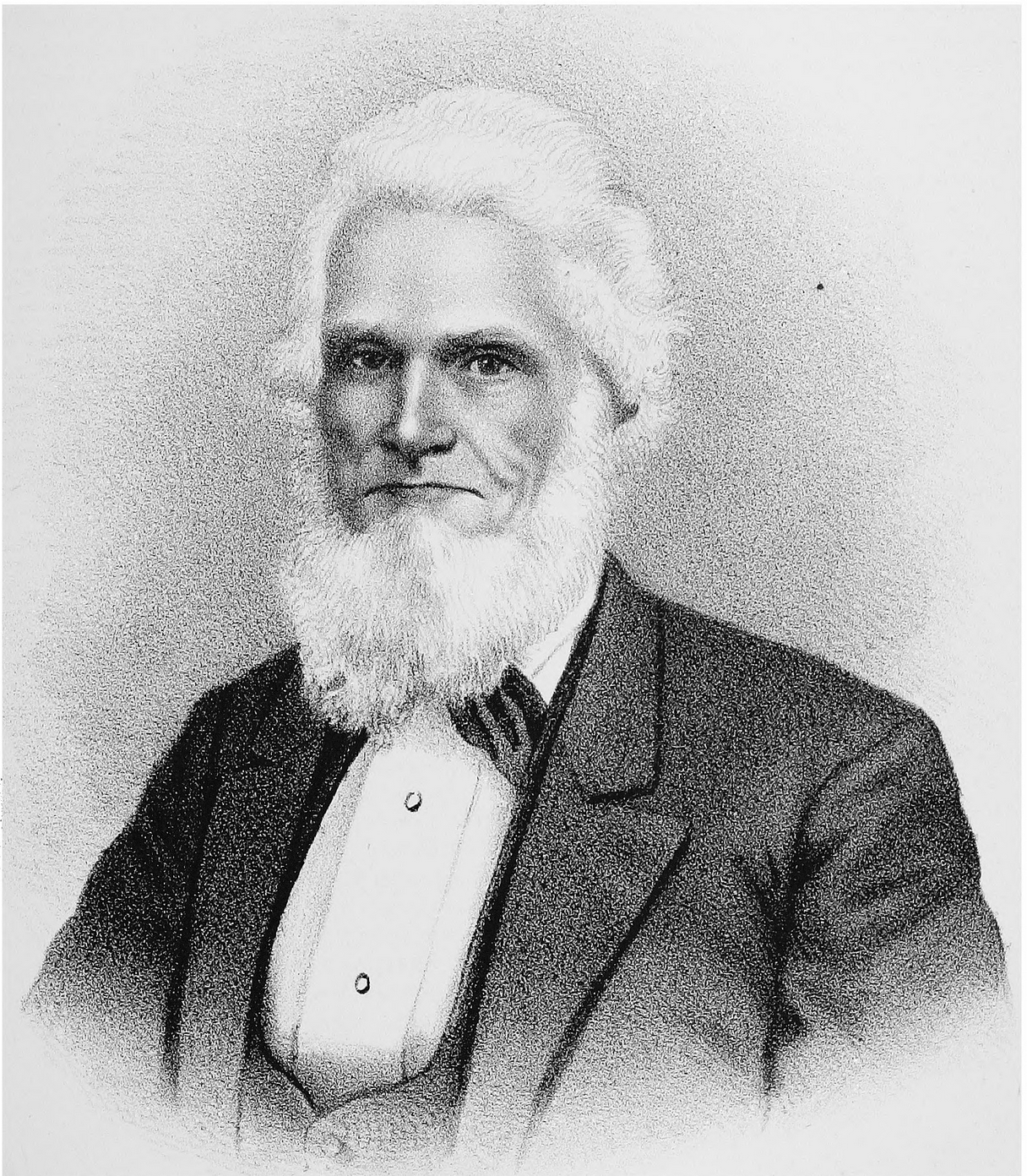

9th Lieutenant Governor of Wisconsin
- In office January 4, 1864 – January 3, 1870
- Governor: James T. Lewis; Lucius Fairchild
- Preceded by: Edward Salomon
- Succeeded by: Thaddeus C. Pound

President pro tempore of the Wisconsin Senate
- In office January 5, 1863 – January 4, 1864
- Preceded by: Gerry Whiting Hazelton
- Succeeded by: Smith S. Wilkinson

10th Speaker of the Wisconsin State Assembly
- In office January 5, 1857 – January 4, 1858
- Preceded by: William Hull
- Succeeded by: Frederick S. Lovell

Wisconsin Circuit Court Judge for the 1st Circuit
- In office June 14, 1853 – September 26, 1853
- Appointed by: Leonard J. Farwell
- Preceded by: Edward V. Whiton
- Succeeded by: James R. Doolittle

Member of the Wisconsin Senate from the 12th district
- In office January 6, 1862 – January 4, 1864
- Preceded by: Oscar Bartlett
- Succeeded by: Newton Littlejohn

Member of the Wisconsin State Assembly from the Walworth 4th district
- In office January 7, 1861 – January 6, 1862
- Preceded by: James Child
- Succeeded by: Hollis Latham
- In office January 5, 1857 – January 4, 1858
- Preceded by: Asa W. Farr
- Succeeded by: James Baker

Member of the Wisconsin State Assembly from the Walworth 5th district
- In office January 7, 1850 – January 5, 1852
- Preceded by: Milo Kelsey
- Succeeded by: Stephen Steele Barlow

Personal details
- Born: Wyman Spooner; July 2, 1795 Hardwick, Massachusetts, U.S.
- Died: November 18, 1877 (aged 82) Lyons, Wisconsin, U.S.
- Resting place: Hazel Ridge Cemetery, Elkhorn, Wisconsin
- Party: Republican (1854-1876); Democratic (after 1876); Free Soil (before 1854)
- Spouse: Elizabeth Fish (m. 1818; died 1877)
- Children: 3
- Profession: lawyer, printer, politician
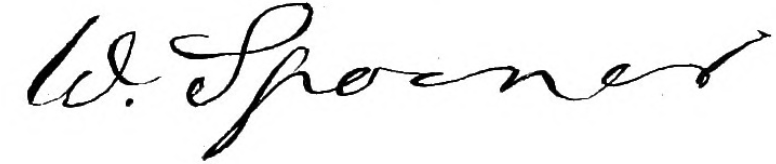
- Signature

Wyman Spooner (July 2, 1795 – November 18, 1877) was an American printer, lawyer, politician, and Wisconsin pioneer. He was the 9th Lieutenant Governor of Wisconsin, the 10th Speaker of the Wisconsin State Assembly, and President pro tempore of the Wisconsin Senate for the 1863 session.

== Background ==
He was born in 1795 in Hardwick, Massachusetts, where he worked as a printer. He studied law in Vermont and was admitted to the Vermont bar. In 1835, he moved to Canton, Ohio, where he practiced law. In 1842, he moved to what is now Elkhorn, Wisconsin.

== Public office ==
From 1847 until 1849 he served as Walworth County's probate judge. He then became a Wisconsin Circuit Court judge. Spooner was an abolitionist and initially a Freesoiler. He was elected in 1849 and 1850 for two one-year terms as a member of the Wisconsin State Assembly from Walworth County's 5th Assembly district. He became a Republican in 1854 upon the organization of that party, and was elected to two additional terms (1857 and 1861) before advancing to the Wisconsin State Senate's 12th District from 1862 until 1863. He served three terms as the ninth Lieutenant Governor of Wisconsin, from 1864 until 1870 under Governors James T. Lewis and Lucius Fairchild.

In 1872 he supported Liberal Republican Horace Greeley for the presidency of the United States. He renounced his membership in the Republican Party entirely in 1876, heading the slate of Democratic presidential electors for nominee Samuel J. Tilden. He died in 1877 in Lyons, Wisconsin.

== Sources ==
- "Wisconsin Constitutional Officers; Lieutenant Governors" (PDF). State of Wisconsin Blue Book 2005–2006. Wisconsin Legislative Reference Bureau. July 2005. p. 31. Archived from the original (PDF) on October 25, 2007.

Party political offices
Preceded by Edward Salomon	Republican nominee for Lieutenant Governor of Wisconsin; 1863, 1865, 1867	Succeeded by Thaddeus C. Pound
Wisconsin State Assembly
Preceded by Milo Kelsey	Member of the Wisconsin State Assembly from the Walworth 5th district January 7, 1850 – January 5, 1852	Succeeded by Stephen Steele Barlow
Preceded by Asa W. Farr	Member of the Wisconsin State Assembly from the Walworth 4th district January 5, 1857 – January 4, 1858	Succeeded by James Baker
Preceded by James Child	Member of the Wisconsin State Assembly from the Walworth 4th district January 7, 1861 – January 6, 1862	Succeeded by Hollis Latham
Preceded by William Hull	Speaker of the Wisconsin State Assembly; January 5, 1857 – January 4, 1858	Succeeded by Frederick S. Lovell
Wisconsin Senate
Preceded by Oscar Bartlett	Member of the Wisconsin Senate from the 12th district January 6, 1862 – January 4, 1864	Succeeded by Newton Littlejohn
Preceded by Gerry Whiting Hazelton	President pro tempore of the Wisconsin Senate; January 5, 1863 – January 4, 1864	Succeeded by Smith S. Wilkinson
Political offices
Preceded by Edward Salomon	Lieutenant Governor of Wisconsin; January 1864 – January 3, 1870	Succeeded by Thaddeus C. Pound
Legal offices
Preceded by Edward V. Whiton	Wisconsin Circuit Court Judge for the 1st Circuit; June 14, 1853 – September 26, 1853	Succeeded by James Rood Doolittle
