= William Starr (politician) =

American politician (1821–1879)

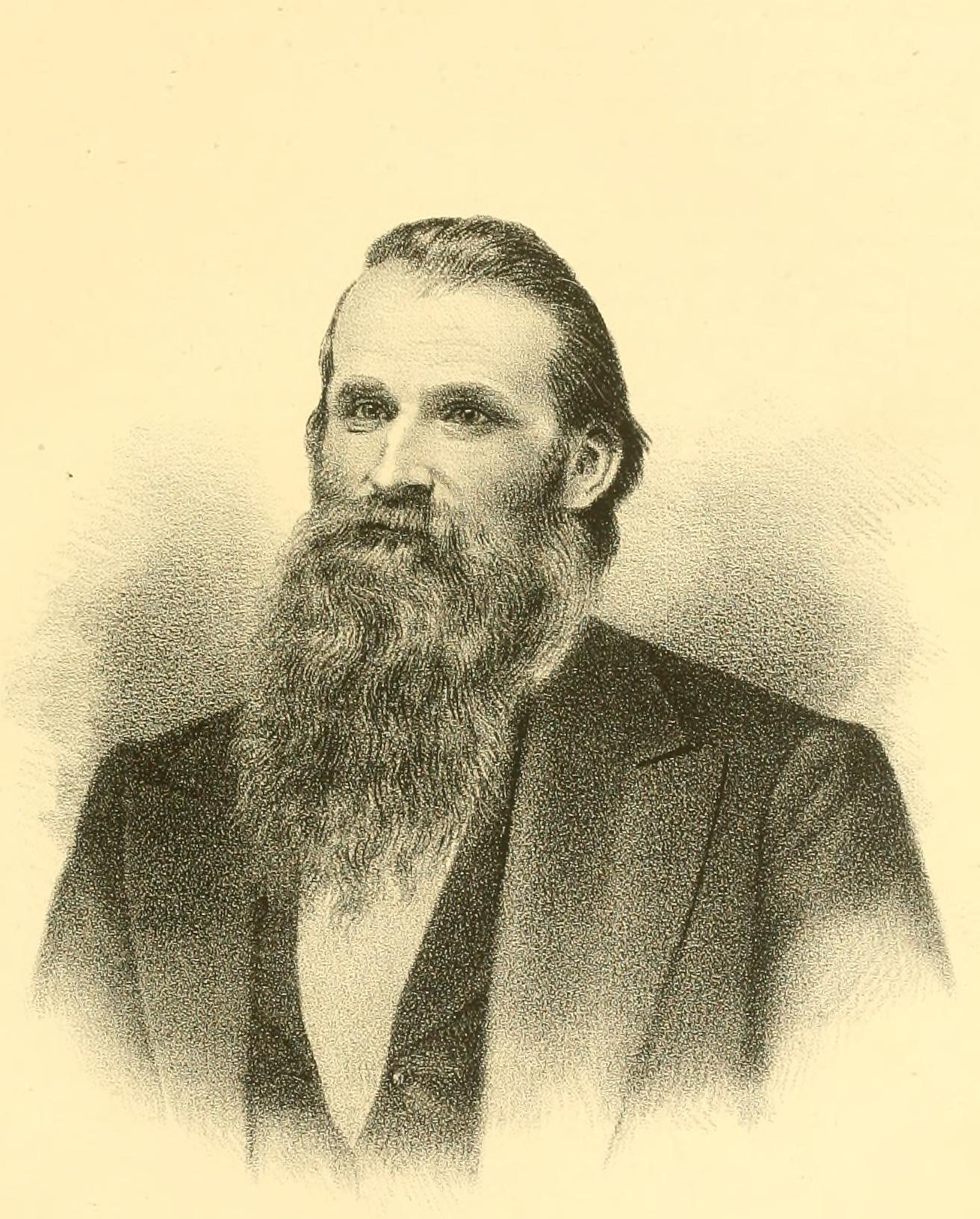
- From The History of Fond du Lac County, Wisconsin (1880)

Member of the Wisconsin State Assembly from the Fond du Lac 1st district
- In office January 5, 1863 – January 2, 1865
- Preceded by: Charles F. Hammond
- Succeeded by: D. C. Van Ostrand

Personal details
- Born: March 3, 1821 Middletown, Connecticut, U.S.
- Died: April 18, 1879 (aged 58) Ripon, Wisconsin, U.S.
- Cause of death: Erysipelas
- Resting place: Hillside Cemetery, Ripon
- Party: Republican
- Spouse: Annie (Clark) (m. 1857–1879)
- Children: William James Starr

William Starr (March 3, 1821 – April 18, 1879) was an American educator, abolitionist politician, and Wisconsin pioneer. He served two terms in the Wisconsin State Assembly, representing western Fond du Lac County, and was president of the board of regents of the Wisconsin State Normal Schools for the last decade of his life.

== About ==
William Starr was born in Middletown, Connecticut, on March 3, 1821. His father died before he was born and at age 8 he went to live in Lewis County, New York, with his mother's new husband. He worked on his stepfather's claim, clearing land and establishing a farm. He was mostly self-educated until age 14, when he attended an academy at Watertown, New York, for the next several winters.

In the Summer of 1843, he went west to the Wisconsin Territory to seek his fortune. He first settled at Southport (Kenosha) and opened a school, teaching Latin, Greek, and English. In 1845, he moved north to the village of Ceresco, in Fond du Lac County. Ceresco had recently been founded as a Fourierist commune. Starr briefly operated a school, but soon switched to a mercantile business.

He was the 2nd appointed postmaster for the town of Ripon, serving until the Spring of 1850. He was one of the founders and original trustees of Brockway College in Ripon. In 1859, he was one of a committee of Ripon residents appointed to canvass Fond du Lac County for the referendum to separate Ripon from Fond du Lac County and attach it instead to Green Lake County. The referendum initially appeared to pass, but was invalidated by the Wisconsin Supreme Court due to election irregularities.

In 1860, abolitionist hero Sherman Booth—who had been imprisoned for violating the Fugitive Slave Act of 1850—was liberated from prison and fled to Ripon. Ripon warmly received him at a public meeting at city hall. Starr served as chairman of the meeting, which resolved to form a "League of Freedom"—to resist any enforcement of the fugitive slave laws. A deputy U.S. marshal showed up at the meeting and attempted to arrest Booth, and was thrown out by the attendees. The meeting voted to prevent the arrest of Booth and appointed a "vigilance committee" to begin forming a militia. The next day, Starr was appointed to communicate to the marshals that they should leave the town without Booth. Due to his role in these events, he was briefly placed under house arrest.

He was elected to the Wisconsin State Assembly in 1862 and 1863, representing Fond du Lac County's 1st Assembly district, which then comprised the northwest corner of the county. After his second term in office, in 1864, he was appointed to the Board of Regents of the Wisconsin State Normal Schools. He was elected president of the board of regents in 1868 and served in that role until his death.

He died of erysipelas in Ripon, Wisconsin, in April 1879.

== Personal life and family ==
William Starr married Annie Clark (née Strong), who had previously married and divorced Temple Clark. They had one child together, William James Starr.

The artist Ruth Starr Rose was his granddaughter.
