= Argalus Starks =

19th century American politician

3rd Prison Commissioner of Wisconsin
- In office January 4, 1854 – January 2, 1856
- Governor: William A. Barstow
- Preceded by: Henry Brown
- Succeeded by: Edward McGarry

Member of the Wisconsin Senate from the 14th district
- In office January 3, 1866 – January 1, 1868
- Preceded by: Smith S. Wilkinson
- Succeeded by: Stephen Steele Barlow

Member of the Wisconsin State Assembly from the Sauk 2nd district
- In office January 1, 1862 – January 3, 1866
- Preceded by: Marsena Temple
- Succeeded by: Rollin M. Strong

Personal details
- Born: March 10, 1804 Williamsburg, Massachusetts, U.S.
- Died: June 28, 1870 (aged 66) Baraboo, Wisconsin, U.S.
- Resting place: Walnut Hill Cemetery, Baraboo, Wisconsin
- Party: Republican; Natl. Union (1861–1867); Democratic (before 1861); Free Soil (1848–1851)
- Spouses: Mary Ann Filkins (m. 1828; died 1838); Margaret R. Worthman (m. 1839; died 1864); Catherine Schwartz (m. 1864–1870)
- Children: Mary Jane (Greeney)^{(b. 1835; died 1914)}; John Starks^{(b. 1841; died 1865)}

Argalus Waldo Starks (March 10, 1804 – June 28, 1870) was an American farmer, politician, and Wisconsin pioneer. He served as the 3rd State Prison Commissioner of Wisconsin and later served 6 years in the Wisconsin Legislature, representing Sauk County.

== Biography ==
Born in Williamsburg, Massachusetts, Starks lived in Jefferson County, New York, and then in Albany, New York. He served on the Albany City Council while living in Albany, New York.

He moved to Milwaukee, Wisconsin Territory, around 1840, and began operating a stage coach line from Milwaukee to Watertown. He became involved with the Democratic Party organization in Milwaukee and was appointed City Marshall, and was nominated for Sheriff of Milwaukee County, but was not elected.

In the late 1840s, he supported the Free Soil Party, but ultimately returned to the Democratic Party. He moved to Sauk County in 1852, and in 1853 he was chosen as the Democratic nominee for the new office of State Prison Commissioner. Prior to 1853, the state had a board of prison commissioners appointed by the Governor; an 1853 law established the elected position of State Prison Commissioner, which office was temporarily held by an appointee of the Governor until the Fall general election of 1853.

His main opponent in the 1853 election was Free Soil candidate Sherman M. Booth, who would—the following year—become famous for his effort to free Joshua Glover in defiance of federal fugitive slave laws.

Starks won the election and was regarded as a fair and honest officeholder—in contrast to Governor William A. Barstow and other state officials of his time, who were implicated in a major bribery investigation. Starks was seen as refusing that influence, and came under attack from Governor Barstow and his allies.

Starks did not run for re-election in 1855, and instead returned to his farm in Sauk County. After the outbreak of the American Civil War, however, Starks chose to re-enter politics as a Union Democrat, and remained aligned with the National Union ticket throughout the war. He was elected to four terms in the Wisconsin State Assembly and one two-year term in the Wisconsin State Senate, running on the Union ticket. He remained a Republican after the war, but died in 1870 of a kidney disease.

== Family ==
In one biography, he is described as a descendant—possibly a grandson—of American Revolutionary War general John Stark, but it's unclear if that's correct.

During the Civil War, his son, John Starks, served as a sergeant in Company A, 6th Wisconsin Infantry Regiment, Iron Brigade, and was badly wounded in their first major battle at Gainesville, Virginia. After recuperating, he was commissioned as first lieutenant of Company I, 23rd Wisconsin Infantry Regiment, and was later promoted to captain of Company K in the same regiment. He was wounded again at the Siege of Vicksburg, and died of complications from this wound two years later.

== Electoral history ==
=== Wisconsin Prison Commissioner (1853) ===
Wisconsin Prison Commissioner Election, 1853
Party	Candidate	Votes	%	±%
General Election, November 8, 1853
Democratic	Argalus W. Starks	30,464	57.93%	
Free Soil	Sherman M. Booth	19,362	36.82%	
Whig	Elisha Starr	2,763	5.25%	
Plurality		11,102	21.11%	
Total votes		52,589	100.0%	
Democratic hold				

Party political offices
New office	Democratic nominee for Prison Commissioner of Wisconsin; 1853	Succeeded by Edward McGarry
Wisconsin State Assembly
Preceded by Marsena Temple	Member of the Wisconsin State Assembly from the Sauk 2nd district January 1, 1862 – January 3, 1866	Succeeded by Rollin M. Strong
Wisconsin Senate
Preceded by Smith S. Wilkinson	Member of the Wisconsin Senate from the 14th district January 3, 1866 – January 1, 1868	Succeeded by Stephen Steele Barlow
Political offices
Preceded by Henry Brown	Prison Commissioner of Wisconsin; January 4, 1854 – January 2, 1856	Succeeded by Edward McGarry
