= Alonzo Wilcox =

American politician

Alonzo Wilcox (March 18, 1810 – March 26, 1878) was an American pioneer and politician.

Born in Edmeston, New York, Wilcox studied medicine at the Cincinnati College of Medicine and Surgery, but he never practiced the profession because of his dislike for it. He moved to Medina, New York in 1821, to Chicago in 1835, to Joliet, Illinois in 1837, and to Warsaw, Illinois in 1840. In 1843, he moved to Madison, Wisconsin Territory, where he married Martha Jane Tofflemire (1826–1915) in 1844. He served on the Madison Village Board and was the city treasurer. In 1856 Wilcox moved to Honey Creek, in Sauk County, Wisconsin and then to Spring Green, Wisconsin in 1862. He served in the Wisconsin State Assembly in 1863 and then was the sergeant-at-arms of the Wisconsin Assembly in 1865. He died in Spring Green, Wisconsin.
