= Milas K. Young =

American politician and murder victim (1812–1875)

Member of the Wisconsin Senate from the 16th district
- In office January 6, 1862 – January 1, 1866
- Preceded by: Noah Virgin
- Succeeded by: John H. Rountree

Member of the Wisconsin State Assembly from the Grant 5th district
- In office January 2, 1854 – January 1, 1855
- Preceded by: Jeremiah Dodge
- Succeeded by: William Cole

Personal details
- Born: July 18, 1812 Salem, Indiana Territory
- Died: May 16, 1875 (aged 62) Glen Haven, Wisconsin, U.S.
- Cause of death: Murdered by his son, Albert
- Resting place: Grant County, Wisconsin
- Party: Republican; Natl. Union (1864–1867); Whig (before 1854)
- Spouse: Julia A. Young (died 1889)
- Children: Albert Young (died 1875); Theodore Young; Mrs. Charles D. Shader; at least 2 other sons
- Education: Hanover College
- Occupation: Farmer

Milas K. Young (July 18, 1812 – May 16, 1875) was an American farmer and Republican politician in the U.S. state of Wisconsin. He was a member of the Wisconsin State Senate and Assembly, representing Grant County. He was murdered by his son in a dispute over the family estate.

== Biography ==
Young was born in Salem, Indiana Territory, in 1812. He was raised on his family's farm and graduated from Hanover College, in Hanover, Indiana. In 1846, he migrated west to the Wisconsin Territory. He briefly practiced law there, but abandoned it and became a successful farmer in Grant County, in the town of Glen Haven, Wisconsin. He was a prominent member of the Blake's Prairie Grange, and through that association became influential in local politics.

In 1853, he was elected on the Whig Party ticket to represent western Grant County in the Wisconsin State Assembly for the 1854 session. He joined the new Republican Party, which was created from the remnants of the Whig and Free Soil parties, and was later elected as a Republican to two terms in the Wisconsin State Senate, representing all of Grant County from 1862 through 1865.

In his years in the Senate, he played an important role in securing funds for improvements on the Fox and Wisconsin rivers, and was one of the key sponsors of legislation endowing the State College of Agriculture.

== Family and murder ==
Milas Young and his wife Julia had at least five children. Though Young ran a successful farm, the land did not actually belong to him. It had been originally purchased by a man named Josiah F. Perrin, who he had known in Indiana. Perrin's wife and Young's wife were sisters, and Perrin allowed Young to manage the land as his homestead on the expectation that he would later be paid from the profits earned. This situation led to complications when Young's eldest son, Albert, attempted to gain control of the land.

Albert had worked for some time for the Lancaster Herald in Grant County, but had arguments with his father over improvements that were being made on the land. Albert was apparently sent away to live with family in Washington County, Indiana, and later went to Louisville, Kentucky. In Louisville, he was involved in a real estate business and left abruptly to return to his parents' home in Wisconsin. Young's other sons ran a store in Glen Haven and had significant debts. When Albert returned to Wisconsin, he and his brothers, through their mother, attempted to convince Josiah Perrin—the actual owner of their family estate—to grant the land to them. Perrin eventually granted the land to Mrs. Young.

At this point, Albert considered himself the master of the property, leading to intense arguments with his father. In one altercation, involving Milas, Albert, and another son, Milas was struck in the face with an axe. He was seriously wounded, but survived and declined to bring a criminal case against his sons.

His sons were undeterred, and attempted to borrow more money by mortgaging the farm. However, they found that without their father's approval, no one was willing to take on the complicated financial situation of the property. They eventually were able to secure capital by forging their father's name on documents, but were quickly exposed and believed they might soon be arrested for the fraud. Albert asked his father to help him out of the situation, but was refused.

That Friday, May 14, 1875, Albert came to the house with a revolver, intent on confronting his father. When Milas refused to see him, Albert broke down his door and chased him out of the house. Outside, Albert found his father also armed with a pistol. They shot and wounded each other. Milas was shot in the head, but still alive. Albert then picked up a hatchet and struck his father in the head several times until he appeared to be dead. Albert fled into the woods and then shot himself in the head.

Though his wounds were fatal, Milas lingered near death for another two days, expiring in the afternoon on Sunday, May 16, 1875. Before he died, he was told that Albert was dead. He responded, "It is a blessing to the community."

After his death, 200 acres of the 300 acre estate were sold off to pay the debts owed by his surviving sons. His widow, Julia, stayed on the remaining 100 acres and, with the assistance of the town chairman, John Ryan, was able to lease the land and pay for her continued subsistence. Nevertheless, she lived a tormented life and committed suicide herself on May 13, 1889.

Wisconsin State Assembly
Preceded by Jeremiah Dodge	Member of the Wisconsin State Assembly from the Grant 5th district January 2, 1854 – January 1, 1855	Succeeded by William Cole
Wisconsin Senate
Preceded by Noah Virgin	Member of the Wisconsin Senate from the 16th district January 6, 1862 – January 1, 1866	Succeeded by John H. Rountree
