= 15th Wisconsin Legislature =

Wisconsin legislative term for 1862

←	14th	16th	→

Overview
- Legislative body: Wisconsin Legislature
- Meeting place: Wisconsin State Capitol
- Term: January 6, 1862 – January 5, 1863
- Election: November 5, 1861

Senate
- Members: 33
- Senate President: Edward Salomon (R); ^{Until April 19, 1862}
- President pro tempore: Frederick O. Thorpe (D); ^{Until September 10, 1862}; Gerry Whiting Hazelton (R); ^{From September 10, 1862}
- Party control: Republican

Assembly
- Members: 100
- Assembly Speaker: Joseph W. Beardsley (UD)
- Party control: Republican

Sessions
- 1st (A): January 8, 1862 – April 7, 1862
- 1st (B): June 3, 1862 – June 17, 1862
- Special: September 10, 1862 – September 26, 1862

The Fifteenth Wisconsin Legislature convened from January 8, 1862, to April 7, 1862, in regular session, and re-convened from June 3, 1862, through June 17, 1862. The legislature further convened in a special session from September 10, 1862, through September 26, 1862.

This was the first legislative session after the expansion and redistricting of the Senate and Assembly according to an act of the previous session. The Senate grew from 30 to 33 seats; the Assembly grew from 97 to 100 seats.

Senators representing even-numbered districts were newly elected for this session and were serving the first year of a two-year term. Assembly members were elected to a one-year term. Assembly members and odd-numbered senators were elected in the general election of November 8, 1861. Senators representing odd-numbered districts were serving the second year of their two-year term, having been elected in the general election held on November 6, 1860, or were elected in the 1861 election for a newly created district and were serving a one-year term.

The governor of Wisconsin during the first regular session of this legislative term was Republican Louis P. Harvey, of Rock County, who was serving the first year of a two-year term, having won election in the 1861 Wisconsin gubernatorial election. Harvey died in an accident on April 19, 1862, after visiting Wisconsin Union Army volunteers at the site of the Battle of Shiloh, in Tennessee. At that time, the lieutenant governor, Republican Edward Salomon, of Manitowoc County, then ascended to become governor for the remainder of this legislative term.

== Major events ==
- January 6, 1862: Inauguration of Louis P. Harvey as the 7th Governor of Wisconsin.
- January 10, 1862: Assemblymember Alexander Campbell of Iowa County resigned his seat after it was demonstrated that he had actually lost his election to Robert Wilson.
- January 16, 1862: Joseph M. Morrow sworn in to replace the deceased Simon D. Powers as assemblymember for the Monroe County district
- April 6–7, 1862: Battle of Shiloh took place in Hardin County, Tennessee. Three regiments of Wisconsin Volunteers participated in the battle. Former Wisconsin state senator James S. Alban was killed, and former state senator Benjamin Allen was wounded.
- April 19, 1862: Wisconsin Governor Louis P. Harvey died in an accident near Savannah, Tennessee. Lieutenant Governor Edward Salomon became the 8th Governor of Wisconsin.
- May 1, 1862: Union forces occupied New Orleans after Confederate forces evacuated the city.
- May 8, 1862: State senator Charles Quentin died.
- September 1, 1862: Dr. Francis Huebschmann was sworn in to replace the deceased Charles Quentin as senator for the 5th district.
- September 17, 1862: Battle of Antietam took place near Sharpsburg, Maryland. Five regiments of Wisconsin Volunteers participated in the battle.
- September 22, 1862: U.S. President Abraham Lincoln issued the Emancipation Proclamation.
- October 8, 1862: Battle of Perryville took place near Perryville, Kentucky.

== Major legislation ==
=== First session ===
- February 17, 1862: Joint Resolutions relative to amending the constitution in regard to the governor's salary, 1862 Joint Resolution 6. Proposed an amendment to the Constitution of Wisconsin to increase the salary of the governor from $1,250 to $2,500 per year. The amendment was rejected by voters in the November general election.
- March 22, 1862: Act to change the name of Bad Ax County to that of Vernon, 1862 Act 137

=== Special session ===
- September 25, 1862: Act to empower towns, cities, incorporated villages and counties to raise money for the payment of bounties to volunteers, 1862 Special Session Act 13

== Party summary ==
=== Senate summary ===
Senate Partisan composition Democratic: 11 seats National Union: 2 seats Republican: 20 seats

	Party (Shading indicates majority caucus)			Total	
	Democratic	Union	Republican	Total	Vacant
End of previous Legislature	8	0	20	30	0
1st Session	11	2	20	33	0
after May 8, 1862 (Note: Charles Quentin (District 5) died in office. Norman S. Cate (District 30) resigned.)	10	1	20	31	2
after June 1, 1862 (Note: Francis Huebschmann (District 5) was elected to replace Charles Quentin.)	11	1	20	32	1
Final voting share	34.38%	65.63%			
Beginning of the next Legislature	14	1	18	33	0

=== Assembly summary ===
Assembly Partisan composition Democratic: 45 seats National Union: 11 seats Republican: 44 seats

	Party (Shading indicates majority caucus)			Total	
	Democratic	Union	Republican	Total	Vacant
End of previous Legislature	26	0	71	97	0
Start of 1st Session (Note: Simeon D. Powers (Monroe County) was elected in the 1861 general election but died December 15, 1861.)	43	11	45	99	1
after January 10 (Note: Robert Wilson replaced Alexander Campbell (Iowa 1st district) due to successful election challenge.)	44	11	44	99	1
after January 16 (Note: Joseph M. Morrow replaced Simeon D. Powers (deceased; Monroe County).)	45	11	44	100	0
after August 11 (Note: Samuel D. Hubbard (Sheboygan 3rd district) resigned.)	45	10	44	99	1
Final voting share	45.45%	54.55%			
Beginning of the next Legislature	44	2	54	100	0

== Sessions ==
- 1st Regular session: January 8, 1862 – April 7, 1862; June 3, 1862 – June 17, 1862
- Special session: September 10, 1862 – September 26, 1862

== Leaders ==
=== Senate leadership ===
- President of the Senate: Edward Salomon, Lieutenant Governor (until April 19, 1862)
- President pro tempore: Frederick O. Thorpe (until September 10, 1862)
  - Gerry Whiting Hazelton (from September 10, 1862)

=== Assembly leadership ===
- Speaker of the Assembly: Joseph W. Beardsley

== Members ==
=== Members of the Senate ===
Members of the Wisconsin Senate for the Fifteenth Wisconsin Legislature:

Senate partisan representation Democratic: 11 seats Union: 2 seats Republican: 20 seats

District	Counties	Senator	Party	Residence
01	Sheboygan	Luther H. Cary	Rep.	Greenbush
02	Brown & Kewaunee	Edward Hicks	Dem.	Green Bay
03	Ozaukee	Hugh Cunning	Dem.	Ozaukee
04	Washington	Frederick O. Thorpe	Dem.	West Bend
05	Milwaukee (Northern Part)	Charles Quentin (until May 8)	Dem.	Milwaukee
05	Milwaukee (Northern Part)	Francis Huebschmann (after June 1)	Dem.	Milwaukee
06	Milwaukee (Southern Part)	Edward Keogh	Dem.	Milwaukee
07	Racine	William L. Utley	Rep.	Racine
08	Kenosha	Hermon S. Thorp	Rep.	Cypress
09	Adams, Juneau, Waushara	John T. Kingston	Rep.	Necedah
10	Waukesha	George C. Pratt	Dem.	Waukesha
11	Dane (Eastern Part)	Samuel C. Bean	Rep.	Sun Prairie
12	Walworth	Wyman Spooner	Rep.	Elkhorn
13	Lafayette	Samuel Cole	Dem.	Gratiot
14	Sauk	Smith S. Wilkinson	Rep.	Prairie du Sac
15	Iowa	Lemuel W. Joiner	Rep.	Wyoming
16	Grant	Milas K. Young	Rep.	Glen Haven
17	Rock	Ezra A. Foot	Rep.	Footville
18	Dodge (Western Part)	Joel Rich	Dem.	Juneau
19	Manitowoc & Calumet	George A. Jenkins	Rep.	Charlestown
20	Fond du Lac	George W. Mitchell	Dem.	Ripon
21	Winnebago	Samuel M. Hay	Rep.	Oshkosh
22	Door, Oconto, Outagamie, Shawanaw	Thomas R. Hudd	Dem.	Appleton
23	Jefferson	Edwin Montgomery	Rep.	Farmington
24	Green	Edmund A. West	Rep.	Monroe
25	Columbia	Gerry W. Hazelton	Rep.	Columbus
26	Dane (Western Part)	Benjamin F. Hopkins	Rep.	Madison
27	Marathon, Portage, Waupaca, Wood	Edward L. Browne	Rep.	Waupaca
28	Ashland, Burnett, Dallas, Douglas, La Pointe, Pierce, Polk, St. Croix	Herman L. Humphrey	Union	Hudson
29	Marquette, Green Lake	Charles S. Kelsey	Rep.	Montello
30	Bad Ax, Crawford, Richland	Norman S. Cate (until May)	Union	De Soto
30	Bad Ax, Crawford, Richland	Vacant from May 1862		
31	La Crosse, Monroe	Edwin Flint	Rep.	La Crosse
32	Buffalo, Chippewa, Clark, Dunn, Eau Claire, Jackson, Pepin, Trempealeau	M. D. Bartlett	Rep.	Durand
33	Dodge (Eastern Part)	Satterlee Clark	Dem.	Horicon

=== Members of the Assembly ===
Members of the Assembly for the Fifteenth Wisconsin Legislature:

Assembly partisan representation Democratic: 45 seats Union: 11 seats Republican: 44 seats

Senate District	County	District	Representative	Party	Residence
09	Adams		George H. Hall	Rep.	Dell Prairie
28	Ashland, Burnett, Dallas, Douglas, La Pointe, Polk		George R. Stuntz	Rep.	Superior
30	Bad Ax	1	Ole C. Johnson	Rep.	Breckenridge
30	Bad Ax	2	Jeremiah M. Rusk	Rep.	Viroqua
02	Brown		Frederick S. Ellis	Dem.	Green Bay
32	Buffalo, Pepin, Trempealeau		Orlando Brown	Rep.	Gilmanton
19	Calumet		William F. Watrous	Dem.	Charleston
32	Chippewa, Dunn, Eau Claire		Horace W. Barnes	Union Rep.	Eau Claire
32	Clark & Jackson		Carl C. Pope	Rep.	Black River Falls
25	Columbia	1	Jonathan Bowman	Rep.	Newport
25	Columbia	2	William Dutcher	Union Dem.	Columbus
25	Columbia	3	Robert B. Sanderson	Rep.	Cambria
30	Crawford		Ormsby B. Thomas	Union Dem.	Prairie du Chien
11	Dane	1	Benjamin F. Adams	Rep.	Door Creek
11	Dane	2	Willard H. Chandler	Rep.	Windsor
26	Dane	3	Alden S. Sanborn	Dem.	Mazomanie
26	Dane	4	Nicholas M. Matts	Rep.	Verona
26	Dane	5	Edmund Jüssen	Rep.	Madison
18	Dodge	1	Quartus H. Barron	Rep.	Fox Lake
18	Dodge	2	John F. McCollum	Dem.	Trenton
18	Dodge	3	Harvey C. Griffin	Dem.	Oak Grove
33	Dodge	4	Jacob G. Mayer	Dem.	LeRoy
33	Dodge	5	David D. Hoppcock	Dem.	Rubicon
22	Door, Oconto, Shawano		Ezra B. Stevens	Rep.	Sturgeon Bay
20	Fond du Lac	1	Charles F. Hammond	Rep.	Ripon
20	Fond du Lac	2	W. W. Hatcher	Dem.	Waupun
20	Fond du Lac	3	Campbell McLean	Dem.	Fond du Lac
20	Fond du Lac	4	John Boyd	Dem.	Calumet
20	Fond du Lac	5	Henry C. Hamilton	Dem.	Waucousta
16	Grant	1	William Brandon	Rep.	Smeltzer's Grove
16	Grant	2	Allen Taylor	Rep.	Dickeyville
16	Grant	3	Joseph T. Mills	Rep.	Lancaster
16	Grant	4	William W. Field	Rep.	Fennimore
16	Grant	5	Samuel Newick	Rep.	Beetown
24	Green	1	Calvin D. W. Leonard	Rep.	Dayton
24	Green	2	Harvey T. Moore	Union Dem.	Spring Grove
29	Green Lake		Archibald Nichols	Rep.	Markesan
15	Iowa	1	Alexander Campbell (until Jan. 10)	Rep.	Ridgeway
15	Iowa	1	Robert Wilson (from Jan. 10)	Dem.	
15	Iowa	2	John H. Vivian	Rep.	Mineral Point
23	Jefferson	1	Peter Rogan	Dem.	Watertown
23	Jefferson	2	Walter S. Greene	Union Dem.	Milford
23	Jefferson	3	William W. Reed	Rep.	Jefferson
23	Jefferson	4	John B. Crosby	Rep.	Palmyra
09	Juneau		D. R. W. Williams	Rep.	Werner
08	Kenosha		Reuben L. Bassett	Union Dem.	Wilmot
02	Kewaunee		George W. Elliott	Dem.	Ahnapee
31	La Crosse		Thomas B. Stoddard	Union Rep.	La Crosse
13	Lafayette	1	Charles B. Jennings	Dem.	Benton
13	Lafayette	2	James Wadsworth	Dem.	Darlington
19	Manitowoc	1	Samuel Rounseville	Ind. Rep.	Meeme
19	Manitowoc	2	James Cahill	Dem.	Franklin
19	Manitowoc	3	Elijah K. Rand	Dem.	Manitowoc
27	Marathon & Wood		Charles Hoeflinger	Dem.	Wausau
29	Marquette		Horatio S. Thomas	Dem.	Briggsville
05	Milwaukee	1	Henry L. Palmer	Dem.	Milwaukee
05	Milwaukee	2	George Abert	Dem.	Milwaukee
06	Milwaukee	3	George K. Gregory	Dem.	Milwaukee
06	Milwaukee	4	Jacob V. V. Platto	Dem.	Milwaukee
06	Milwaukee	5	John M. Stowell	Dem.	Milwaukee
05	Milwaukee	6	Adam Finger	Dem.	Milwaukee
05	Milwaukee	7	Henry Kirchhoff	Dem.	Ten Mile House
06	Milwaukee	8	Perley J. Shumway	Dem.	Wauwatosa
06	Milwaukee	9	L. Semmann	Dem.	Oak Creek
31	Monroe		--Vacant-- (until Jan. 16)		
31	Monroe		Joseph M. Morrow (from Jan. 16)	Ind. Dem.	Sparta
22	Outagamie		Milo Coles	Dem.	Borina
03	Ozaukee		John A. Schletz	Dem.	Grafton
28	Pierce & St. Croix		Joseph W. Beardsley	Union Dem.	Prescott
27	Portage		Alexander S. McDill	Rep.	Plover
07	Racine	1	Calvin H. Upham	Rep.	Racine
07	Racine	2	Thomas Butler	Dem.	Mount Pleasant
07	Racine	3	James Catton	Dem.	Burlington
30	Richland		Leroy D. Gage	Dem.	Richland
17	Rock	1	Nathan B. Howard	Rep.	Magnolia
17	Rock	2	Ephraim Palmer	Rep.	Edgerton
17	Rock	3	Samuel Miller	Rep.	Shopiere
17	Rock	4	John Bannister	Union Rep.	Beloit
17	Rock	5	Allen C. Bates	Rep.	Janesville
17	Rock	6	Orrin Guernsey	Rep.	Janesville
14	Sauk	1	J. Stephens Tripp	Dem.	Sauk City
14	Sauk	2	Argalus W. Starks	Union Dem.	Baraboo
01	Sheboygan	1	Godfrey Stamm	Dem.	Sheboygan
01	Sheboygan	2	John E. Thomas	Dem.	Sheboygan Falls
01	Sheboygan	3	Samuel D. Hubbard (until Aug. 11)	Union	Scott
01	Sheboygan	3	--Vacant-- (from Aug. 11)		
01	Sheboygan	4	Benjamin Dockstader	Rep.	Plymouth
12	Walworth	1	Fayette P. Arnold	Rep.	South Grove
12	Walworth	2	Sylvester Hanson	Rep.	La Grange
12	Walworth	3	Hilton W. Boyce	Ind. Rep.	Geneva
12	Walworth	4	Hollis Latham	Dem.	Elkhorn
04	Washington	1	Thomas Barry	Dem.	Erin
04	Washington	2	Michael Maloy	Dem.	Richfield
04	Washington	3	Robert Salter	Dem.	Newburg
10	Waukesha	1	George W. Brown	Dem.	Brookfield Center
10	Waukesha	2	Samuel Thompson	Rep.	Hartland
10	Waukesha	3	Peter D. Gifford	Dem.	North Prairie
10	Waukesha	4	William A. Vanderpool	Dem.	Vernon
27	Waupaca		Chester D. Combs	Rep.	North Royalton
09	Waushara		William C. Webb	Ind. Rep.	Wautoma
21	Winnebago	1	William E. Hanson	Rep.	Oshkosh
21	Winnebago	2	Michael Hogan	Dem.	Menasha
21	Winnebago	3	David R. Bean	Rep.	Waukau

== Employees ==
=== Senate employees ===
- Chief Clerk: John H. Warren
  - Assistant Clerk: Erasmus D. Campbell
  - Engrossing Clerk: T. Wilson Caster
  - Enrolling Clerk: J. M. Randall
  - Transcribing Clerk: F. W. Stewart
- Sergeant-at-Arms: Bloom U. Caswell
  - Assistant Sergeant-at-Arms: James L. Wilder
- Postmaster: H. W. Browne
  - Assistant Postmaster: D. H. Pulcifer
- Doorkeeper: William C. Lesure
  - Assistant Doorkeeper: Julius C. Chandler
- Firemen:
  - C. H. Beyler
  - John Crowley
- Messengers:
  - Fred Sholes
  - Albert F. Dexter
  - William L. Abbott

=== Assembly employees ===
- Chief Clerk: John S. Dean
  - Assistant Clerk: Ephraim W. Young
    - Bookkeeper: Sylvester Foord Jr.
  - Engrossing Clerk: Herbert A. Lewis
  - Enrolling Clerk: Daniel Brisbois
  - Transcribing Clerk: Henry F. Pelton
- Sergeant-at-Arms: A. A. Huntingdon
  - Assistant Sergeant-at-Arms: Jas. G. Alden
  - 2nd Assistant Sergeant-at-Arms: J. W. Overbaugh
- Postmaster: A. A. Bennett
  - Assistant Postmaster: N. F. Pierce
  - 2nd Assistant Postmaster: William P. Bowman
- Doorkeeper: J. I. Ellis
  - Assistant Doorkeeper: Frederik Huchting
  - Assistant Doorkeeper: E. T. Kearney
- Firemen:
  - Reese Evans
  - E. C. Cavenaugh
  - Barnet Wilson
- Messengers:
  - E. C. Mason
  - Jno. N. Ford
  - E. D. Strong
  - Albert W. Carpenter
  - Fred. VanBergen
  - William Booth
  - Samuel Myers
  - Hugh Spencer
  - Rufus H. Roys
  - George D. Potter
  - Linus S. Webb

== Changes from the 14th Legislature ==
New districts for the 15th Legislature were defined in 1861 Wisconsin Act 216, passed into law in the 14th Wisconsin Legislature.

=== Senate redistricting ===
==== Summary of changes ====
- 17 senate districts were left unchanged.
- The Dane County district boundaries were slightly redrawn (11, 26).
- Dodge County went from having one senator to two (18, 33).
- Jefferson County went from two senators to one (23).
- Rock County went from two senators to one (17).
- Sauk County became its own senate district (14), after previously having been in a shared district with Adams and Juneau counties.
- Iowa County became its own senate district (15), after previously having been in a shared district with Richland county.
- Waushara County was moved from the 27th district to the 9th.
- The multi-county northeastern district was divided into two (2, 22).
- The multi-county western region of the state went from two senators to four (28, 30, 31, 32).

==== Senate districts ====
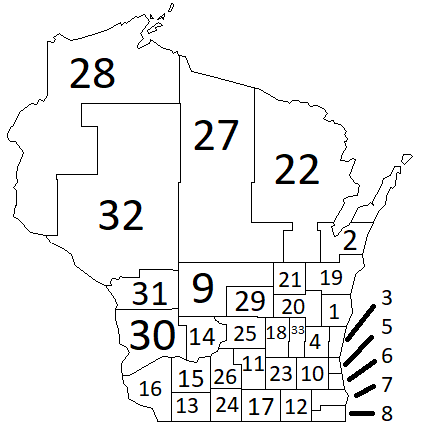
after redistricting

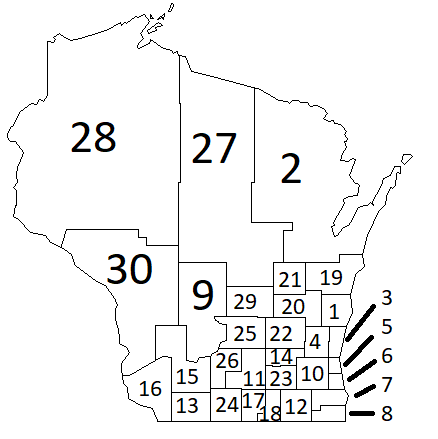
before redistricting

Dist.	14th Legislature	15th Legislature
1	Sheboygan County	Sheboygan County
2	Brown, Outagamie, Door, Kewaunee, Oconto, Shawano counties	Brown, Kewaunee counties
3	Ozaukee County	Ozaukee County
4	Washington County	Washington County
5	Northern Milwaukee County	Northern Milwaukee County
6	Southern Milwaukee County	Southern Milwaukee County
7	Racine County	Racine County
8	Kenosha County	Kenosha County
9	Adams, Juneau, Sauk counties	Adams, Juneau, Waushara counties
10	Waukesha County	Waukesha County
11	Eastern Dane County	Eastern Dane County
12	Walworth County	Walworth County
13	Lafayette County	Lafayette County
14	Northern Jefferson County	Sauk County
15	Iowa, Richland counties	Iowa County
16	Grant County	Grant County
17	Western Rock County	Rock County
18	Eastern Rock County	Western Dodge County
19	Manitowoc, Calumet counties	Manitowoc, Calumet counties
20	Fond du Lac County	Fond du Lac County
21	Winnebago County	Winnebago County
22	Dodge County	Door, Oconto, Outagamie, Shawanaw counties
23	Southern Jefferson County	Jefferson County
24	Green County	Green County
25	Columbia County	Columbia County
26	Western Dane County	Western Dane County
27	Marathon, Portage, Waupaca, Waushara, Wood counties	Marathon, Portage, Waupaca, Wood counties
28	Burnett, Chippewa, Clark, Douglas, Dunn, La Pointe, Pierce, Polk, St. Croix counties	Ashland, Burnett, Dallas, Douglas, La Pointe, Pierce, Polk, St. Croix counties
29	Marquette County	Marquette County
30	Bad Ax, Buffalo, Crawford, Jackson, La Crosse, Monroe, Tremealeau counties	Bad Ax, Crawford, Richland counties
31	Did not exist in 14th Legislature	La Crosse, Monroe counties
32	Did not exist in 14th Legislature	Buffalo, Chippewa, Clark, Dunn, Eau Claire, Jackson, Pepin, Trempealeau counties
33	Did not exist in 14th Legislature	Eastern Dodge County

=== Assembly redistricting ===
==== Summary of changes ====
- Adams and Juneau counties became separate assembly districts, after previously having been in a shared district.
- Bad Ax County became 2 assembly districts, after previously having been in a shared district with Crawford County.
- Dane County went from having 6 districts to 5.
- Dodge County went from having 6 districts to 5.
- Jefferson County went from having 5 districts to 4.
- Kenosha County went from having 2 districts to 1.
- Kewaunee County became its own assembly district, after previously having been in a shared district with Door, Oconto, and Shawano counties.
- La Crosse and Monroe counties became separate assembly districts, after previously having been in a shared district.
- Lafayette County went from having 3 districts to 2.
- Manitowoc County went from having 2 districts to 3.
- Marquette County went from having 2 districts to 1.
- Ozaukee County went from having 2 districts to 1.
- Portage County became its own assembly district, after previously having been in a shared district with Marathon and Wood counties.
- Racine County went from having 4 districts to 3.
- Rock County went from having 5 districts to 6.
- Sheboygan County went from having 3 districts to 4.

==== Assembly districts ====
County	Districts in 14th Legislature	Districts in 15th Legislature
Adams	Shared with Juneau	1 District
Ashland	Shared with Burnett, Douglas, La Pointe, Polk, St. Croix	Shared with Burnett, Dallas, Douglas, La Pointe, Polk
Bad Ax	Shared with Crawford	2 Districts
Brown	1 District	1 District
Buffalo	Shared with Jackson, Trempealeau	Shared with Pepin, Trempealeau
Burnett	Shared with Ashland, Douglas, La Pointe, Polk, St. Croix	Shared with Ashland, Dallas, Douglas, La Pointe, Polk
Calumet	1 District	1 District
Chippewa	Shared with Clark, Dunn, Pierce	Shared with Dunn, Eau Claire
Clark	Shared with Chippewa, Dunn, Pierce	Shared with Jackson
Columbia	3 Districts	3 Districts
Crawford	Shared with Bad Ax	Shared with Bad Ax
Dallas	Did not exist	Shared with Ashland, Burnett, Douglas, La Pointe, Polk
Dane	6 Districts	5 Districts
Dodge	6 Districts	5 Districts
Door	Shared with Kewaunee, Oconto, Shawano	Shared with Oconto, Shawano
Douglas	Shared with Ashland, Burnett, La Pointe, Polk, St. Croix	Shared with Ashland, Burnett, Dallas, La Pointe, Polk
Dunn	Shared with Chippewa, Clark, Pierce	Shared with Chippewa, Eau Claire
Eau Claire	Did not exist	Shared with Chippewa, Dunn
Fond du Lac	5 Districts	5 Districts
Grant	5 Districts	5 Districts
Green	2 Districts	2 Districts
Green Lake	1 District	1 District
Iowa	2 Districts	2 Districts
Jackson	Shared with Buffalo, Trempealeau	Shared with Clark
Jefferson	5 Districts	4 Districts
Juneau	Shared with Adams	1 District
Kenosha	2 Districts	1 District
Kewaunee	Shared with Door, Oconto, Shawano	1 District
La Crosse	Shared with Monroe	1 District
La Pointe	Shared with Ashland, Burnett, Douglas, Polk, St. Croix	Shared with Ashland, Burnett, Dallas, Douglas, Polk
Lafayette	3 Districts	2 Districts
Manitowoc	2 Districts	3 Districts
Marathon	Shared with Portage, Wood	Shared with Wood
Marquette	2 Districts	1 District
Milwaukee	9 Districts	9 Districts
Monroe	Shared with La Crosse	1 District
Oconto	Shared with Door, Kewaunee, Shawano	Shared with Door, Shawano
Outagamie	1 District	1 District
Ozaukee	2 Districts	1 District
Pepin	Shared with Chippewa, Clark, Dunn	Shared with Buffalo, Trempealeau
Pierce	Shared with Chippewa, Clark, Dunn	Shared with St. Croix
Polk	Shared with Ashland, Burnett, Douglas, La Pointe, St. Croix	Shared with Ashland, Burnett, Dallas, Douglas, La Pointe
Portage	Shared with Marathon, Wood	1 District
Racine	4 Districts	3 Districts
Richland	1 District	1 District
Rock	5 Districts	6 Districts
Sauk	2 Districts	2 Districts
Shawano	Shared with Door, Kewaunee, Oconto	Shared with Door, Oconto
Sheboygan	3 Districts	4 Districts
St. Croix	Shared with Ashland, Burnett, Douglas, La Pointe, Polk	Shared with Pierce
Trempealeau	Shared with Buffalo, Jackson	Shared with Buffalo, Pepin
Walworth	4 Districts	4 Districts
Washington	3 Districts	3 Districts
Waukesha	4 Districts	4 Districts
Waupaca	1 District	1 District
Waushara	1 District	1 District
Winnebago	3 Districts	3 Districts
Wood	Shared with Marathon, Portage	Shared with Marathon
