= Thomas W. Hill =

American politician

Thomas Warden Hill (January 9, 1817 - May 26, 1879) was an American farmer from Springfield, Wisconsin, who held a number of offices in local government. He served two one-year terms as a member of the Wisconsin State Assembly from Walworth County: one term as a Freesoiler and a second term, ten years later, as a Republican.

== Background ==
Thomas W. Hill was born in Swanton, Vermont, on January 9, 1817, and moved when he was five years old from Lewis, Essex County, New York, to elsewhere in the country. His parents died when he was a child, and he was raised by his uncle, who he lived with until he was 21 years old.

In the fall of 1838, he left for the frontier, traveling mostly on foot. He arrived in Geneva in the Wisconsin Territory on October 15 of that year, and found work in a store and in a gristmill on local a farm. By March 1839, he bought a plot of land in Hudson (now Lyons), which he retained for the rest of his life. He was elected to office for the first time in the 1840 elections of Geneva, when he was chosen as tax collector and constable.

In the spring of 1842, he joined the Presbyterian Church in Geneva after being moved by a series of revival meetings during the previous winter. On February 12, 1843, he married Lydia Ferris. On their first anniversary, they moved to his land in Hudson, where they lived for most of the next three decades. They continued to improve the original land and expanded their holdings over the years, and Hill pursued private studies to supplement his formal education.

== Public office ==
Hill held numerous offices in Hudson during his time there, including chairing the township's board of supervisors. Between 1849 and 1867, he was elected repeatedly to the county board of supervisors, including one year (1865) as the board's chairman and one of the county's Superintendents of the Poor.

His first term in the Wisconsin State Assembly was for the sixth session of the state legislature (1853), in which he represented the 2nd Walworth County district (the towns of Elkhorn, Geneva and Hudson). He was assigned to the standing committee on claims, and was succeeded in the next term by Simeon Spafard, a Democrat.

He was elected to the Assembly again for the sixteenth session (1863), succeeding fellow Republican Sylvester Hanson in a redistricted 2nd district, which consisted of La Grange, Richmond, Sugar Creek, and Whitewater. He was assigned once again to the committee on claims, and also to town and county organization. He was succeeded in the next session by fellow Republican Daniel Smith.

== After the Assembly ==
After serving with the Assembly, Hill continued to farm and participate in local politics. In the spring of 1868, he moved back to Geneva and stayed there until the spring of 1870, when he was put in charge of the county poor farm and asylum, a position he held until his death. He held numerous offices in his church, including superintendent of the Sabbath school, deacon, and ruling elder.

On May 26, 1879, he died suddenly of a heart attack while overseeing work at his old homestead.
