= Charles Brown (Wisconsin politician) =

American politician (born 1828)

Member of the Wisconsin State Assembly from the 2nd Waukesha County district
- In office January 1, 1872 – January 6, 1873
- Succeeded by: David Rhoda

Personal details
- Born: June 24, 1828 Bristol, New Hampshire, U.S.
- Died: January 28, 1889 (aged 60) Jackson, Michigan, U.S.
- Party: Republican
- Spouse: Jane Wilson (m. 1859)
- Occupation: Farmer; politician

Charles Brown (June 24, 1828 – January 28, 1889) was an American farmer from Brookfield Center, Wisconsin, who served a single one-year term as a member of the Wisconsin State Assembly from Waukesha County during the 1872 term (the 25th Wisconsin Legislature).

== Background ==
Brown was born in Bristol, New Hampshire on June 24, 1828 to Samuel Clement Brown and Martha A. Johnson. He received a public school education, and became a farmer. He came to Wisconsin in 1856, and settled in Waukesha County. He married Jane Wilson on April 28, 1859, in Waukesha, Wisconsin. He died on January 28, 1889, in Jackson, Jackson, Michigan, United States, at the age of 60, and was buried in Mount Evergreen Cemetery in Jackson, Michigan.

== Political office ==
He was elected in 1871 for the 2nd Waukesha County Assembly district (the Towns of Delafield, Brookfield, Lisbon, Menomonee, Merton, Oconomowoc and Pewaukee) as a Republican, with 1342 votes to 1036 votes for Democrat C. M. Smith. He was assigned to the standing committees on state affairs and town and county organization.

== Identity ==
This Charles Brown cannot be the same as the Charles E. Brown who served in the 3rd (1845) session of the 4th Wisconsin Territorial Assembly in 1845, representing an unspecified portion of a House of Representatives district which included the present-day Milwaukee, Ozaukee, Washington, and Waukesha counties.
