= George W. Brown (Wisconsin politician) =

American politician

George W. Brown (ca. 1819 - ?) was an American farmer from Brookfield Center, Wisconsin who served a single one-year term as a Democratic member of the Wisconsin State Assembly in 1862 (the 15th Wisconsin Legislature).

In January 1862, he was 42 years old, a native of New York (state), and had been in Wisconsin for 16 years. He was elected to represent the new 1st Waukesha County Assembly district (the Towns of Brookfield, Lisbon, Menomonee, and Pewaukee) as a Democrat. (The Assembly had been redistricted, and the new district combined parts of the old 2nd and 4th districts, represented by William H. Thomas (a Democrat) and Myron Gilbert (a Republican) respectively.) He was assigned to the standing committee on internal improvements.

He was succeeded in the 1863 session by Silas Richardson, a fellow Democrat.
