= Denison Worthington =

American politician

President pro tempore of the Wisconsin Senate
- In office January 3, 1859 – January 2, 1860
- Preceded by: Hiram H. Giles
- Succeeded by: Moses M. Davis

Member of the Wisconsin Senate from the 10th district
- In office January 4, 1858 – January 6, 1862
- Preceded by: Edward Gernon
- Succeeded by: George C. Pratt

Member of the Wisconsin Senate from the 9th district
- In office January 1, 1855 – January 5, 1857
- Preceded by: George R. McLane
- Succeeded by: John T. Kingston

Member of the Wisconsin State Assembly from the Waukesha 1st district
- In office January 2, 1854 – January 1, 1855
- Preceded by: Orson Reed
- Succeeded by: Stephen Warren

Member of the Wisconsin State Assembly from the Waukesha 2nd district
- In office January 5, 1852 – January 3, 1853
- Preceded by: Peter D. Gifford
- Succeeded by: Elisha Pearl

Personal details
- Born: March 4, 1806 Colchester, Connecticut
- Died: April 23, 1880 (aged 74) Denver, Colorado
- Resting place: Summit Town Cemetery; Summit, Waukesha County, Wisconsin
- Party: Republican; Whig (before 1855)
- Spouses: Martha (Searing) Worthington; (m. 1829; died 1839); Mary Ann (LaGrange) Worthington; (m. 1840; died 1856); Julia M. (Proudfit) Worthington; (m. 1860; died 1864)
- Children: 3 with Martha Searing: Robert Searing Worthington ^{(b. 1830; died 1903)}; Harriet Worthington ^{(b. 1833; died 1838)}; William Henry Worthington ^{(b. 1836; died 1837)}; 7 with Mary Ann LaGrange: Denison LaGrange Worthington ^{(b. 1841; died 1885)}; William Henry Worthington II ^{(b. 1843; died 1881)}; Mary Frances (Hennegen) ^{(b. 1845; died 1933)}; Martha Worthington ^{(b. 1846; died 1900)}; James LaGrange Worthington ^{(b. 1850)}; Gerrit Hazard Worthington ^{(b. 1854)}; Frank Town Worthington ^{(b. 1856; died 1927)}
- Parents: Daniel Worthington, Sr. (father); Elizabeth (Hazard) Worthington (mother)
- Occupation: Grocer, farmer, executive, politician

Denison Worthington (March 4, 1806 – April 23, 1880) was a member of the Wisconsin State Assembly and the Wisconsin State Senate. His first name is sometimes spelled "Dennison" in historical documents.

== Biography ==
Worthington was born on March 4, 1806, in Colchester, Connecticut, to Daniel Worthington, Sr., and Elizabeth "Betsey" Hazard. His siblings were Robert Worthington I, Daniel Worthington, Jr., Joel Worthington, Samuel Worthington, Eliza Worthington Crawford, Dr. Robert Hazard Worthington II, Giles Worthington, and Ophelia Worthington.

After living for a time in Albany, New York, Worthington moved to Oconomowoc, Wisconsin. He married Martha Searing on Christmas Eve of 1829. He had three children: Robert Searing Worthington, Hattie Worthington, and William Henry Worthington I. Martha died in 1839. The following year, on June 3, 1840, he married Mary Ann LaGrange, with whom he had seven children: Denison LaGrange Worthington, William Henry Worthington II, Mary Frances Worthington Hennegan, Martha Worthington, James LaGrange Worthington, Gerrit Hazard Worthington, and Frank Tows Worthington. Mary Ann died in 1856. In 1860, he married Julia McNaughton Proudfit, the sister of Andrew Proudfit. Worthington died on April 23, 1880, in Denver, Colorado.

== Career ==
Worthington was first involved in the grocery business in 1835. He owned Worthington and Davis wholesale grocery stores until his move to the Wisconsin Territory in 1847. While in Albany, he served on the city council. After moving to Wisconsin, he was involved in farming. He was elected to the Wisconsin Assembly in 1852 and was re-elected in 1854. He was elected to three two-year terms as a member of the Senate, first from 1855 to 1856, and then again from 1858 through 1861. In 1859, he was elected president pro tempore of the Senate. He was secretary of Madison Mutual Insurance Company from 1861 to 1874, when resigned due to poor health. He then moved to Denver, Colorado, where he spent his final years.
