= Fred W. Draper =

American politician

Fredrick William Draper (July 22, 1868 – September 2, 1962) was an American politician and educator.

Born in Dundee, Fond du Lac County, Wisconsin, in the town of Osceola, Draper moved with his parents to Loyal, Clark County, Wisconsin. Draper went to the Loyal Public Schools and then to Oshkosh Normal School (now University of Wisconsin–Oshkosh). Clark taught school in Clark County. From 1901 to 1911, Draper was Clark County Circuit Court Clerk and was a Republican. He also served on the school board and was justice of the peace. In 1911, Draper served in the Wisconsin State Assembly. Draper moved to Greensboro, North Carolina to live with his daughter. He died in Greensboro and was buried in his hometown of Loyal.
