= Edward Gernon =

19th century American politician

Member of the Wisconsin Senate from the 10th district
- In office January 7, 1856 – January 4, 1858
- Preceded by: James DeNoon Reymert
- Succeeded by: Denison Worthington

Personal details
- Born: December 26, 1800
- Died: June 23, 1877 (aged 76) Genesee, Wisconsin, U.S.
- Cause of death: Edema
- Resting place: Prairie Home Cemetery, Waukesha, Wisconsin
- Party: Democratic
- Spouse: Catherine Huyck (m. 1828–1877)
- Children: 3
- Profession: Lawyer

Edward Gernon (December 26, 1800 – June 23, 1877) was an American lawyer, politician, and Wisconsin pioneer. He was a member of the Wisconsin Senate, representing Waukesha County during the 1856 and 1857 sessions. He was one of dozens of lawmakers in the 1856 session caught up in the La Crosse and Milwaukee Railroad bribery scheme.

== Biography ==
Edward Gernon lived for many years in Claverack, New York, where he was elected justice of the peace in the 1840s and 1850s, running on the Democratic Party ticket.

He moved west to Wisconsin in 1854 with his wife and children. They settled on a farm in the town of Genesee, in Waukesha County, where he resided for the rest of his life.

Almost immediately after arriving in Wisconsin, he became involved in politics with the Democratic Party of Wisconsin. Although he did not pursue the office, in 1855, he was nominated for Wisconsin Senate by a fractious Democratic Party convention in Waukesha County. The Democratic Party of Wisconsin at the time was split over several issues, but prominently over the re-election of Governor William A. Barstow, who was tainted by corruption allegations. Gernon's opponent in the general election was former U.S. senator Isaac P. Walker, who was an anti-Barstow Democrat running as an independent. Gernon narrowly prevailed in the election, and went on to serve a two-year term representing Wisconsin's 10th State Senate district—then-comprising the southern half of Waukesha County.

During the 1856 term of the Legislature, Gernon was one of dozens of Wisconsin legislators caught up in a massive railroad bribery scheme. In a subsequent investigation, Gernon was found to have received $10,000 worth of the corrupt railroad stock (over $360,000 adjusted for inflation to 2023).

== Personal life and family ==
On January 16, 1828, Edward Gernon married Catherine Huyck at Claverack, New York, as members of the Dutch Reformed Church. They had at least three children. Their son Stephen served for several years as chairman of the Genesee town board, and was a member of the Republican Party of Wisconsin state central committee.

Gernon died at his home in Genesee on June 23, 1877, after suffering from Edema.

Wisconsin Senate
Preceded by James DeNoon Reymert	Member of the Wisconsin Senate from the 10th district January 7, 1856 – January 4, 1858	Succeeded by Denison Worthington
