= Chauncey Purple =

American politician

Chauncey H. Purple (c. 1820 – December 13, 1882) was an American businessman and clerical worker from Wisconsin who served one term as a Whig member of the Wisconsin State Assembly from Waukesha County, Wisconsin. He was also a prominent member of the temperance movement in that state.

== Background ==
Purple was born in Weedsport, in Cayuga County, New York, in about 1820. He spent some time "in mercantile pursuits" before moving to Wisconsin in 1844. He lived first in Waukesha, then called Prairieville, where he operated a dry goods store for some years.

== Legislature and other state service ==
He was living in Brookfield Center when he was elected to the Assembly for a one-year term in 1854 as a Whig, succeeding Free Soiler Elisha Pearl. He was not a candidate for re-election, and was succeeded by fellow Whig Benjamin F. Goss.

In 1858 he was invited to Madison to take a position as bank clerk in the office of Samuel D. Hastings, then Wisconsin State Treasurer and a fellow temperance advocate. He was soon promoted to Assistant State Treasurer, a job he would hold for about ten years under Hastings and his successor William E. Smith (both Republicans).

== After state service ==
After retiring from the Treasurer's office, Purple moved to Watertown and went into the lumber trade, in which he was doing well until the Panic of 1873.

== Personal life ==
He was first married in Weedsport; that wife's name is unknown, but when she died he was left with a step-daughter. In 1850 he remarried, to Mary C. Patterson, with whom he would have seven more children. He was very active locally and at a wider level in the temperance movement, taking a leadership position in several organizations, including the Sons of Temperance, Good Templars and Band of Hope. He was also an active member of the Congregational Church. He died unexpectedly from "neuralgia of the heart" on December 13, 1879.
