= Elisha Pearl =

American politician

Elisha Pearl (7 March 1819 – 20 November 1896) was an American farmer from Lisbon, Wisconsin, who served one term as a Free Soil Party member of the Wisconsin State Assembly from Waukesha County, Wisconsin.

== Background ==
Pearl was born on 7 March 1819, in Ashford, Connecticut. He first came to what was then the Wisconsin Territory in 1839, returned to Connecticut, came back and settled near Merton in Waukesha County. He returned to Connecticut once more, where he married Sarah Trowbridge (a fellow native of Ashford), and the two of them came to Wisconsin in 1844 to stay on the farm he had established in Lisbon.

== Public office ==
Before Wisconsin had become a state, on 14 August 1846, a convention of the newly organized Liberty Party was held in Prairieville. Although Pearl was not himself a delegate, he was nominated by the convention to the office of County Register of Deeds for the upcoming election, but seems to have failed of election. He served on the first jury ever empaneled in the county; and was a member of the county board of supervisors for a one-year term in 1850.

Pearl was elected to a one-year term in the Assembly's 4th Waukesha County district (the Towns of Brookfield, Lisbon, Menomonee and Pewaukee) in 1852 as a Free Soil candidate, after a redistricting had cost the county one of its Assembly seats. He was succeeded the next year by Whig Chauncey Purple.

== Later years ==
In later years Pearl identified with the Republican Party which carried on the ideals of the Liberty and Free Soil parties; and served as a justice of the peace in Lisbon. He died 20 November 1896, in his home in Lisbon after a rapid decline; he had not been actively engaged in farming for many years, but leased his lands and lived quietly in his home. His wife had died a few months earlier, on 3 February 1896. The couple left two surviving sons, Edward and Eugene.
