= Wiley Ward Hatcher =

19th century American politician

W. W. Hatcher
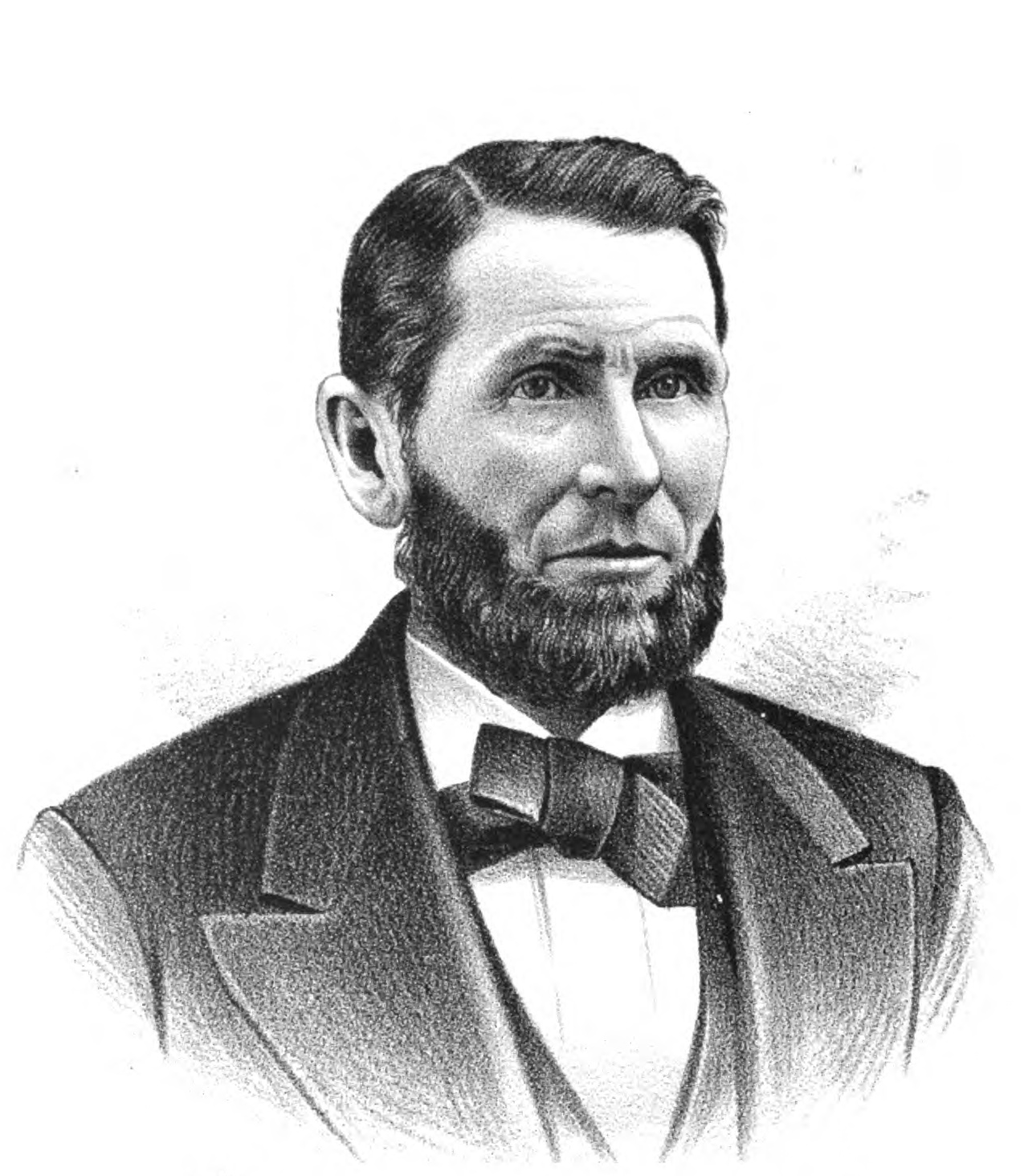
- From Portrait and biographical album of Fond du Lac County, Wisconsin (1889)

Member of the Wisconsin State Assembly from the Fond du Lac 2nd district
- In office January 6, 1862 – January 5, 1863
- Preceded by: Benjamin H. Bettis
- Succeeded by: Freeman M. Wheeler

Personal details
- Born: May 3, 1828 Henry County, Tennessee, U.S.
- Died: May 12, 1908 (aged 80)
- Party: Democratic
- Spouse: Julia Alden Pond (m. 1856; died 1893)
- Children: Mary Adell Hatcher; Wiley Clifford Hatcher; Harriet Adelaide Hatcher

Wiley Ward Hatcher (May 3, 1828 – May 12, 1908) was an American businessman and politician. He served one term in the Wisconsin State Assembly representing Fond du Lac County.

== Biography ==
Wiley Ward Hatcher was born in Henry County, Tennessee, on May 3, 1828. His parents both died of typhoid fever just two years later, leaving him an orphan. He was sent to live with his mother's brother, James Baker. He had little education as a child, but at age seventeen went off on his own, working as a farmhand in the summers and attending school in the winters.

In 1849, he went west for the California Gold Rush. He took a ship from New Orleans around Cape Horn, and stopped briefly in Valparaíso, before arriving in California. He worked successfully as a miner in California until 1853, when he traveled to Australia to continue his mining and prospecting career. Over the next several years, he traveled extensively between California, Australia, and various Pacific islands. He shipped oil from Australia to California and shipped grain, wool, and pelts from California to Australia and New Zealand, some of this was in partnership with B. F. Pond.

After several years, he returned to the eastern United States landing at New York City on December 23, 1855. He married there three months later, and journeyed from New York to Pennsylvania, Tennessee, and finally Wisconsin. They settled at Waupun, Wisconsin, in Fond du Lac County, and made that their permanent residence.

Hatcher purchased land in the city and built a stone business block, which he used for a grocery store for seven years. He also dealt in real estate.

Politically, Hatcher was always loyal to the Democratic Party. He was elected to the Wisconsin State Assembly for the 1862 session. He also served on the village board and the county board of supervisors.

== Personal life and family ==
Hatcher was a son of Eli Hatcher and his wife Joanna (née Baker). The Hatchers and Bakers were both of English ancestry, and trace their ancestry to 18th century immigrants to Maryland.

Wiley Hatcher married Julia Alden Pond on March 20, 1856, in New York City. The Ponds trace their ancestry to Daniel Pond, an early settler of Dedham, in the Massachusetts Bay Colony. Wiley and Julia had three children, though their son, Wiley Clifford, died in childhood. Hatcher died at his home in Waupun on May 12, 1908.

Wisconsin State Assembly
Preceded by Benjamin H. Bettis	Member of the Wisconsin State Assembly from the Fond du Lac 2nd district January 6, 1862 – January 5, 1863	Succeeded by Freeman M. Wheeler
