= Osceola, Fond du Lac County, Wisconsin =

Osceola, Wisconsin
- Town
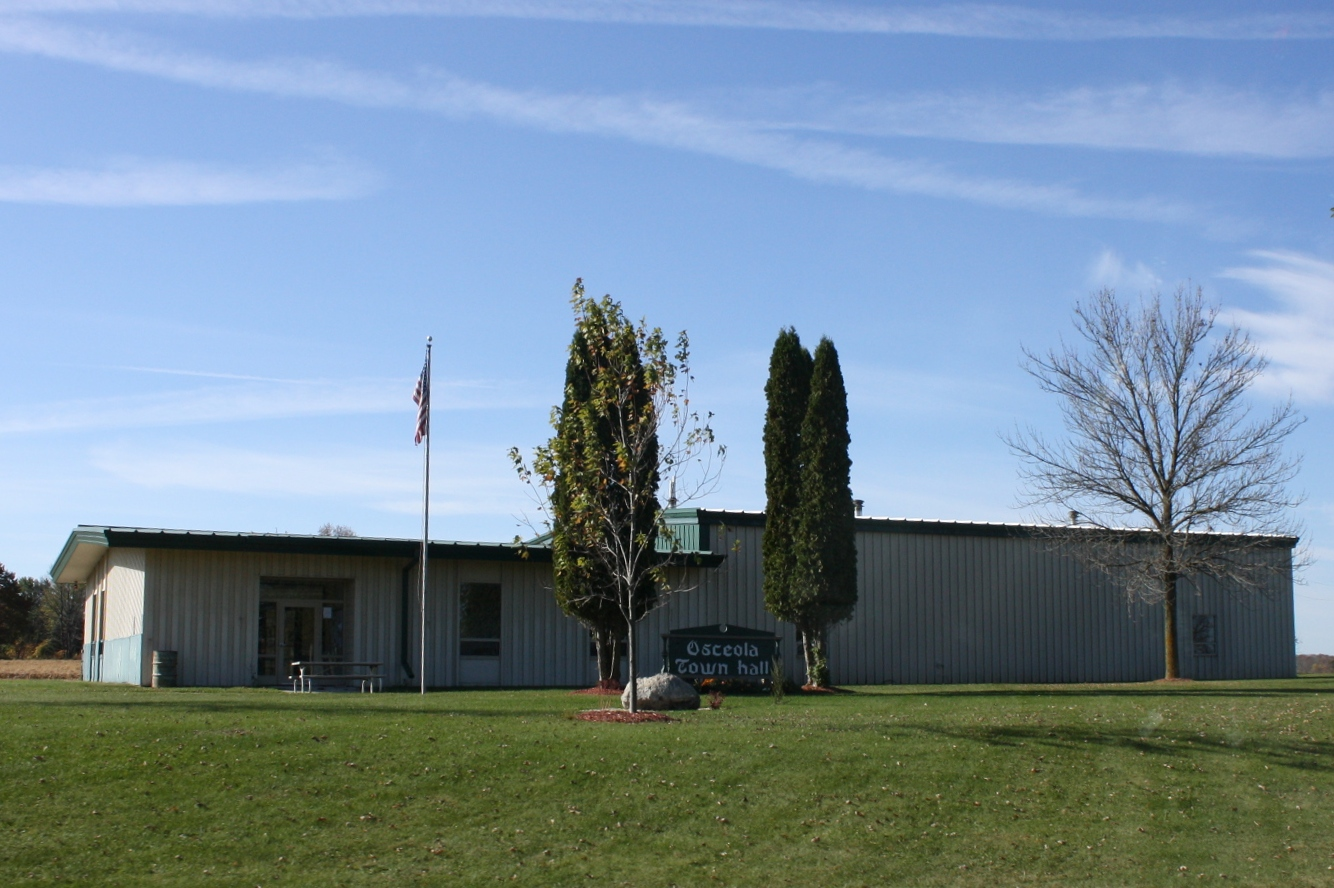
- Town hall

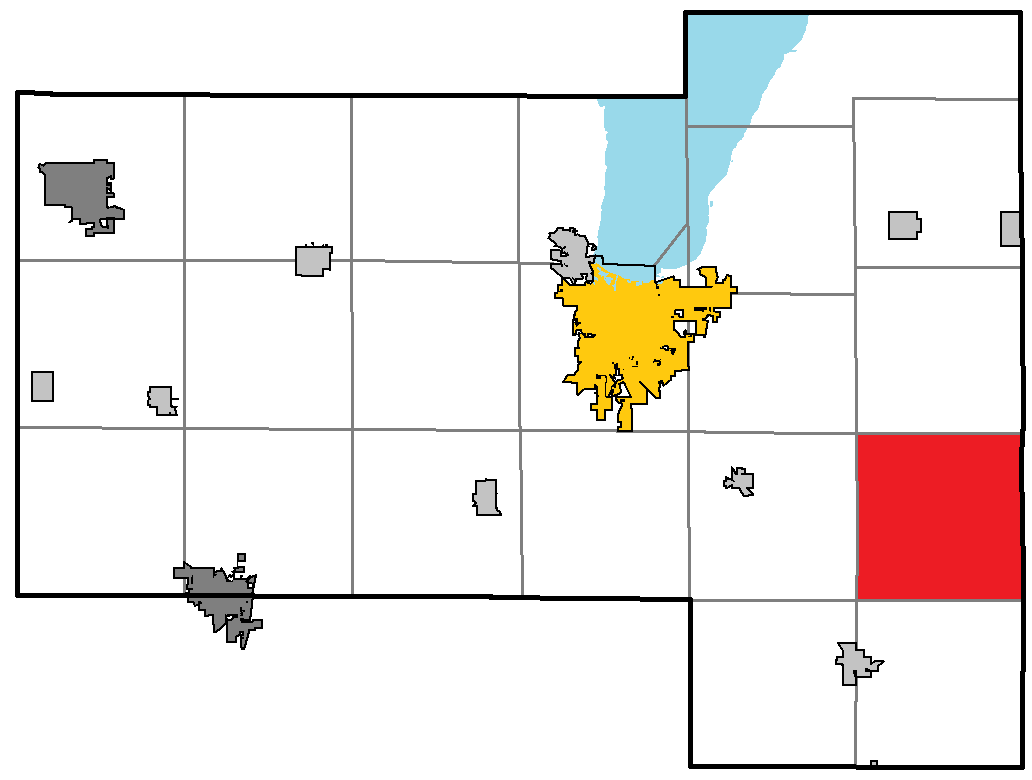
- Location of Osceola, within Fond du Lac County
- Coordinates: 43°39′59″N 88°11′27″W
- Country: United States
- State: Wisconsin
- County: Fond du Lac

Area
  - Total: 36.4 sq mi (94.2 km^{2})
  - Land: 35.1 sq mi (91.0 km^{2})
  - Water: 1.2 sq mi (3.2 km^{2})
- Elevation: 1,040 ft (317 m)

Population (2020)
  - Total: 1,836
  - Density: 52.3/sq mi (20.2/km^{2})
- Time zone: UTC-6 (Central (CST))
  - Summer (DST): UTC-5 (CDT)
- Area code: 920
- FIPS code: 55-60425
- GNIS feature ID: 1583873
- Website: http://www.townofosceola.org/

Osceola is a town in Fond du Lac County, in the U.S. state of Wisconsin. As of the 2020 census, the town population was 1,836. The unincorporated communities of Armstrong, Chinatown, Dundee, and Waucousta are located in the town.

== Geography ==
According to the United States Census Bureau, the town has a total area of 36.4 square miles (94.2 km^{2}), of which 35.1 square miles (91.0 km^{2}) is land and 1.2 square miles (3.2 km^{2}) (3.38%) is water.

== Demographics ==
As of the census of 2000, there were 1,802 people, 701 households, and 510 families residing in the town. The population density was 51.3 people per square mile (19.8/km^{2}). There were 890 housing units at an average density of 25.3 per square mile (9.8/km^{2}). The racial makeup of the town was 98.17% White, 0.28% Native American, 0.44% Pacific Islander, 0.78% from other races, and 0.33% from two or more races. Hispanic or Latino of any race were 1.00% of the population.

There were 701 households, out of which 29.8% had children under the age of 18 living with them, 64.2% were married couples living together, 5.0% had a female householder with no husband present, and 27.2% were non-families. 21.4% of all households were made up of individuals, and 8.7% had someone living alone who was 65 years of age or older. The average household size was 2.57 and the average family size was 3.01.

In the town, the population was spread out, with 23.8% under the age of 18, 7.7% from 18 to 24, 29.8% from 25 to 44, 25.9% from 45 to 64, and 12.8% who were 65 years of age or older. The median age was 40 years. For every 100 females, there were 112.2 males. For every 100 females age 18 and over, there were 113.5 males.

The median income for a household in the town was $47,672, and the median income for a family was $54,097. Males had a median income of $36,250 versus $23,350 for females. The per capita income for the town was $20,568. About 4.4% of families and 4.0% of the population were below the poverty line, including 4.5% of those under age 18 and 6.6% of those age 65 or over.

== Notable people ==
- Daniel Cavanagh, Wisconsin State Representative and Senator and farmer, was Treasurer and Chairman of the Board of Supervisors of the town
- Fred W. Draper, Wisconsin State Representative and educator, was born in the town, in the community of Dundee
