= Jacob Van Vechten Platto =

19th century American politician

J. V. V. Platto
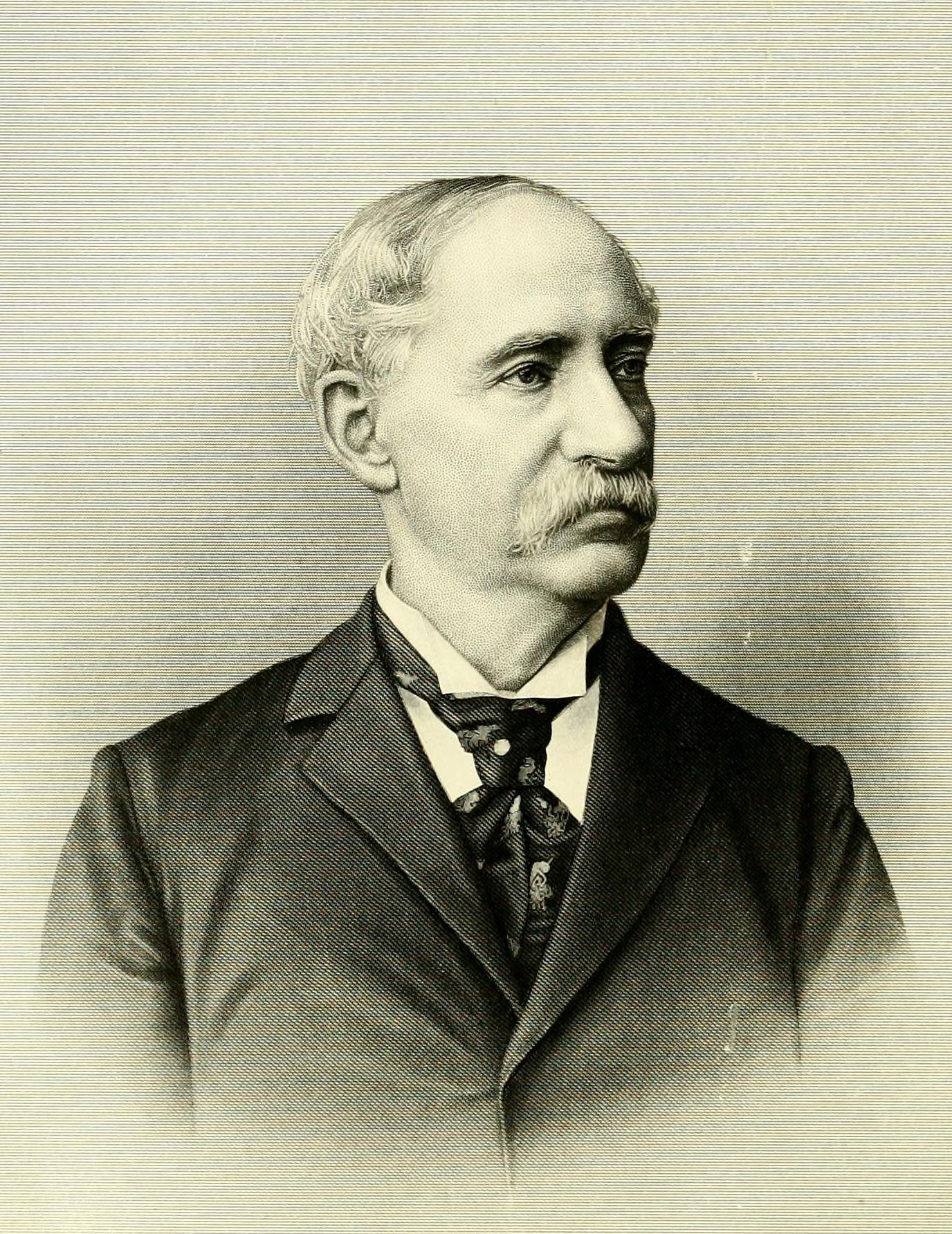
- From History of Milwaukee from its first settlement to the year 1895 (1895)

Member of the Wisconsin State Assembly from the Milwaukee 4th district
- In office January 6, 1862 – January 5, 1863
- Preceded by: Charles Caverno
- Succeeded by: Martin Larkin Jr.

Personal details
- Born: January 17, 1822 Schenectady, New York, U.S.
- Died: January 2, 1898 (aged 75) Milwaukee, Wisconsin, U.S.
- Resting place: Forest Home Cemetery, Milwaukee
- Party: Democratic
- Spouse: Mary Whitney (m. 1843–1898)
- Children: Charles Platto^{(b. 1844; died 1855)}; Mary Platto^{(b. 1849; died 1850)}; Frances Julia (Stacy)^{(b. 1852; died 1917)}; Edwin Wells Platto^{(b. 1855; died 1913)}; Alice H. (Esbenshade)^{(b. 1861; died 1907)}
- Profession: Lawyer

Jacob Van Vechten Platto (January 17, 1822 – January 2, 1898) was an American lawyer, politician, and Wisconsin pioneer. He was a member of the Wisconsin State Assembly, representing the west side of the city of Milwaukee during the 1862 session. In historical documents, his name was often abbreviated as J. V. V. Platto, and his first name was sometimes incorrectly listed as "John".

== Early life ==
Jacob V. V. Platto was born in Schenectady, New York, in January 1822. At age six, he moved with his parents to Albany, New York, where his father was employed. He was raised and educated in Albany, and, at age 16, he went to study law as a clerk in the office of Judge Rufus Wheeler Peckham. While obtaining his legal education from Peckham, he also maintained Peckham's finances and became a skilled bookkeeper in the process. As a result, after his admission to the bar in 1843, his first job was as a bookkeeper for a large wholesale dry goods seller in New York City.

== Legal career ==
In 1848, he moved to Milwaukee, Wisconsin, where he became invested in a wholesale liquor business. His business ventures brought him a significant income, and, about 1856, he decided he had accumulated sufficient wealth to being a legal practice without endangering his financial situation.

In 1860, he achieved significant notoriety among the Wisconsin legal community, when he took on the defense of George P. Shelton, a black man accused of killing an Irishman. The killing had inflamed racial tension in the city on the eve of the American Civil War, and while he was held as a defendant in the crime, the county had to pay $500 per day ($18,000 per day, adjusted for inflation to 2022) to protect Shelton from mob violence. Shelton had difficulty finding legal representation, because many of Milwaukee's lawyers feared the wrath of the mob. Although Platto had little experience in criminal law, he accepted Shelton's case just days before the start of the trial. He argued that Shelton had acted in self defense and won a stunning acquittal, earning commendation from the bar and firmly establishing his standing among Milwaukee's legal elite. He also appeared as counsel in another major Milwaukee murder case, but generally preferred civil practice.

Shortly after his arrival in Milwaukee, he purchased a lot at the corner of what was then 8th & Spring Streets (now 8th St & Wisconsin Avenue) in Milwaukee's Westown neighborhood. He built a cottage there, and later replaced it with a larger home, where he resided for the rest of his life.

He died at his home in Milwaukee on January 2, 1898. He had been largely bedridden for seven years, due to a stroke in 1891.

== Political career ==
Platto was interested in public affairs, but was not very active in politics, and not interested in holding offices. He was considered a conservative member of the Democratic Party, and stood for election only once. He was elected to the Wisconsin State Assembly in 1861, representing Milwaukee County's 4th Assembly district—comprising what was then the city's fourth ward, a strip of land about six blocks wide, running on the north bank of the Menomonee River, from the west bank of the Milwaukee River to the city's western limits.

== Personal life and family ==
J. V. V. Platto was a son of Frederick Platto and his wife Bathshebu (née Chapman). Frederick Platto was an early settler in Schenectady and was a successful building contractor in New York. While the family was living in Albany, Frederick Platto was involved in constructing several buildings on behalf of the state government.

J. V. V. Platto married Mary Whitney in 1843. They had at least five children, though only three survived to adulthood.

Wisconsin State Assembly
Preceded by Charles Caverno	Member of the Wisconsin State Assembly from the Milwaukee 4th district January 6, 1862 – January 5, 1863	Succeeded by Martin Larkin Jr.
