= Brookfield Center, Wisconsin =

Former settlement in Wisconsin, United States

- Hamlet
- Interactive map of Brookfield Center, Wisconsin
- Coordinates: 43.072°N 88.146°W
- Country: United States
- State: Wisconsin
- County: Waukesha
- Town: Brookfield

Brookfield Center (also known as Brookfield Heights, Brookfield Junction, and Brookfield Center Junction) is a hamlet in the Town of Brookfield in Waukesha County, Wisconsin, United States, located roughly four miles northwest of Elm Grove. There was a post office there at least as late as 1890.

== Notable people ==
- Charles Brown, farmer and state legislator
- George W. Brown, state legislator
- Chauncey Purple, state legislator
