= Springfield, Walworth County, Wisconsin =

Census-designated place in Wisconsin, United States

Springfield, Wisconsin
- Census-designated place
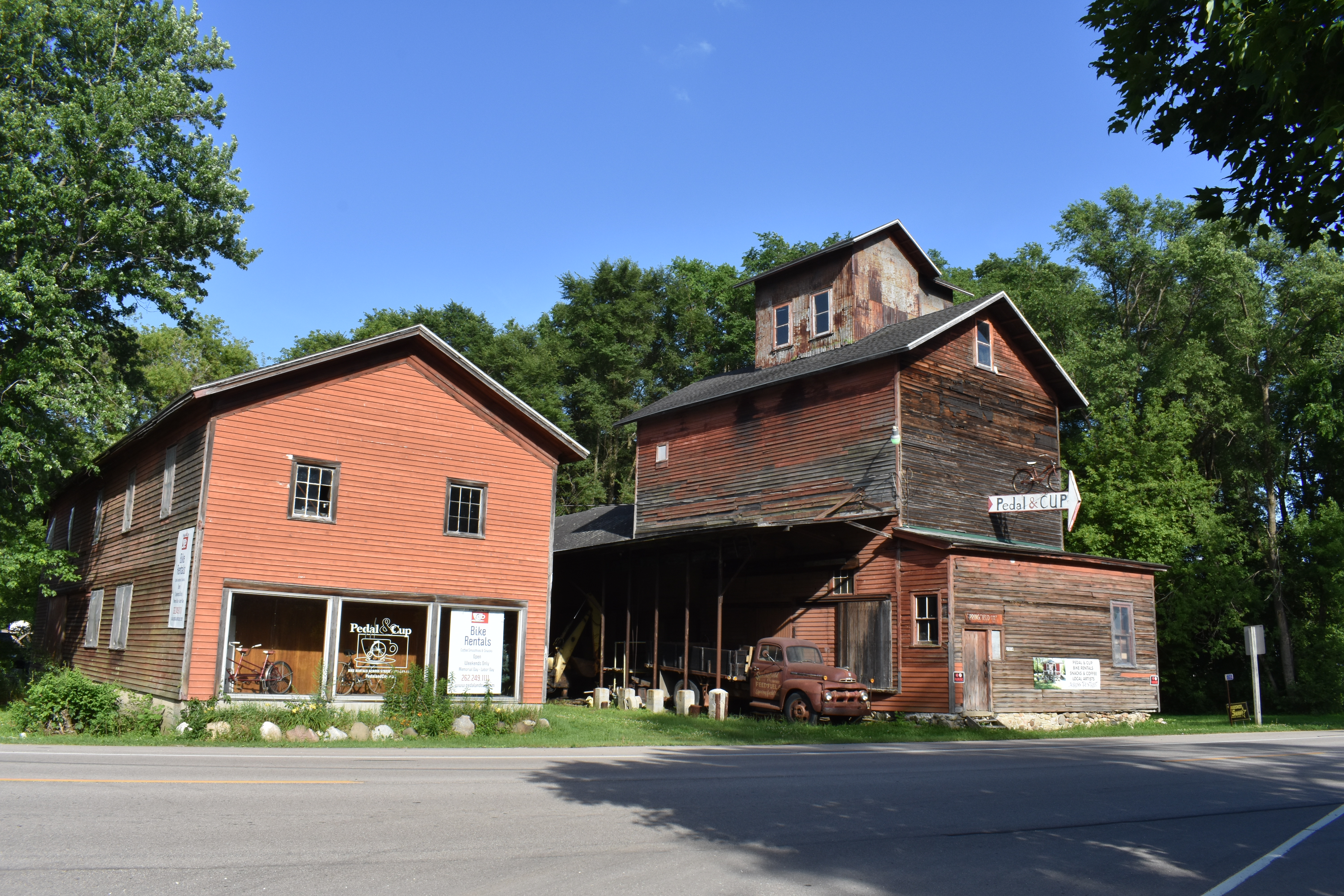
- Grain elevator in Springfield

- Location within Wisconsin
- Coordinates: 42°38′30″N 88°24′43″W
- Country: United States
- State: Wisconsin
- County: Walworth

Area
  - Total: 0.673 sq mi (1.74 km^{2})
  - Land: 0.673 sq mi (1.74 km^{2})
  - Water: 0 sq mi (0 km^{2})
- Elevation: 853 ft (260 m)

Population (2020)
  - Total: 168
  - Density: 250/sq mi (96.4/km^{2})
- Time zone: UTC-6 (Central (CST))
  - Summer (DST): UTC-5 (CDT)
- ZIP Code: 53176
- Area code: 262
- GNIS feature ID: 1574721

Springfield is an unincorporated community and census-designated place in the town of Lyons, in Walworth County, Wisconsin, United States. As of the 2020 census, its population was 168. Located just northeast of Lake Geneva, it contains a mere eight streets.

== Geography ==
Springfield has an area of 0.673 square miles (1.74 km^{2}), all land.

== History ==
The community has a long history, dating back nearly two hundred years. Many of its early settlers are buried at nearby Union Cemetery. Some fought in the American Civil War. It was the home town of Assemblyman Thomas W. Hill. A few homes remain from the Victorian Era. Some are condemned and are considered unsafe, but others have been updated or renovated.

== Demographics ==
Historical population
Census	Pop.	Note	%±
2010	158		—
2020	168		6.3%
U.S. Decennial Census

== Transportation ==
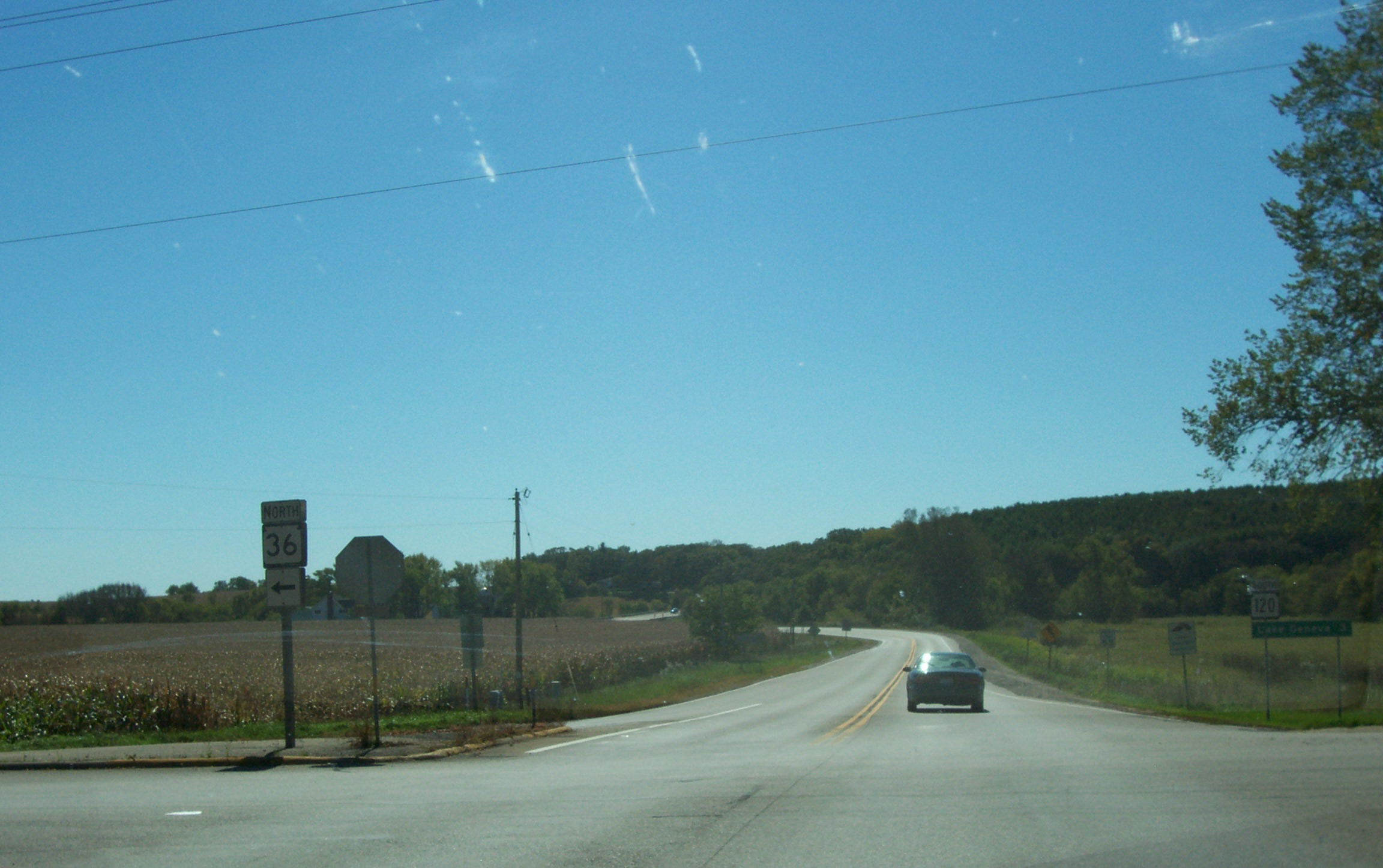
West terminus of Hwy 36 from Hwy 120 in Springfield

Springfield was a stop on the Racine & Southwestern branch line of the Chicago, Milwaukee, St. Paul and Pacific Railroad, better known as the Milwaukee Road. In its 1980 bankruptcy, the Milwaukee Road disposed of the Southwestern Line.

The former train depot now serves as a cafe and rest spot for users of the White River State Trail.

== See also ==
- List of census-designated places in Wisconsin
