= Armstrong, Wisconsin =

- Unincorporated community
- Location within Wisconsin Location within the United States
- Coordinates: 43°42′37″N 88°11′41″W
- Country: United States
- State: Wisconsin
- County: Fond du Lac
- Elevation: 1,076 ft (328 m)
- Time zone: UTC-6 (Central (CST))
  - Summer (DST): UTC-5 (CDT)
- Area code: 920
- GNIS feature ID: 1577494

Armstrong is an unincorporated community located in the town of Osceola, Fond du Lac County, Wisconsin, United States. It was settled in 1851 and a post office was opened in 1862.

Famous people include Stanley Stanczyk, a weightlifter
