= Chinatown, Wisconsin =

- Unincorporated community
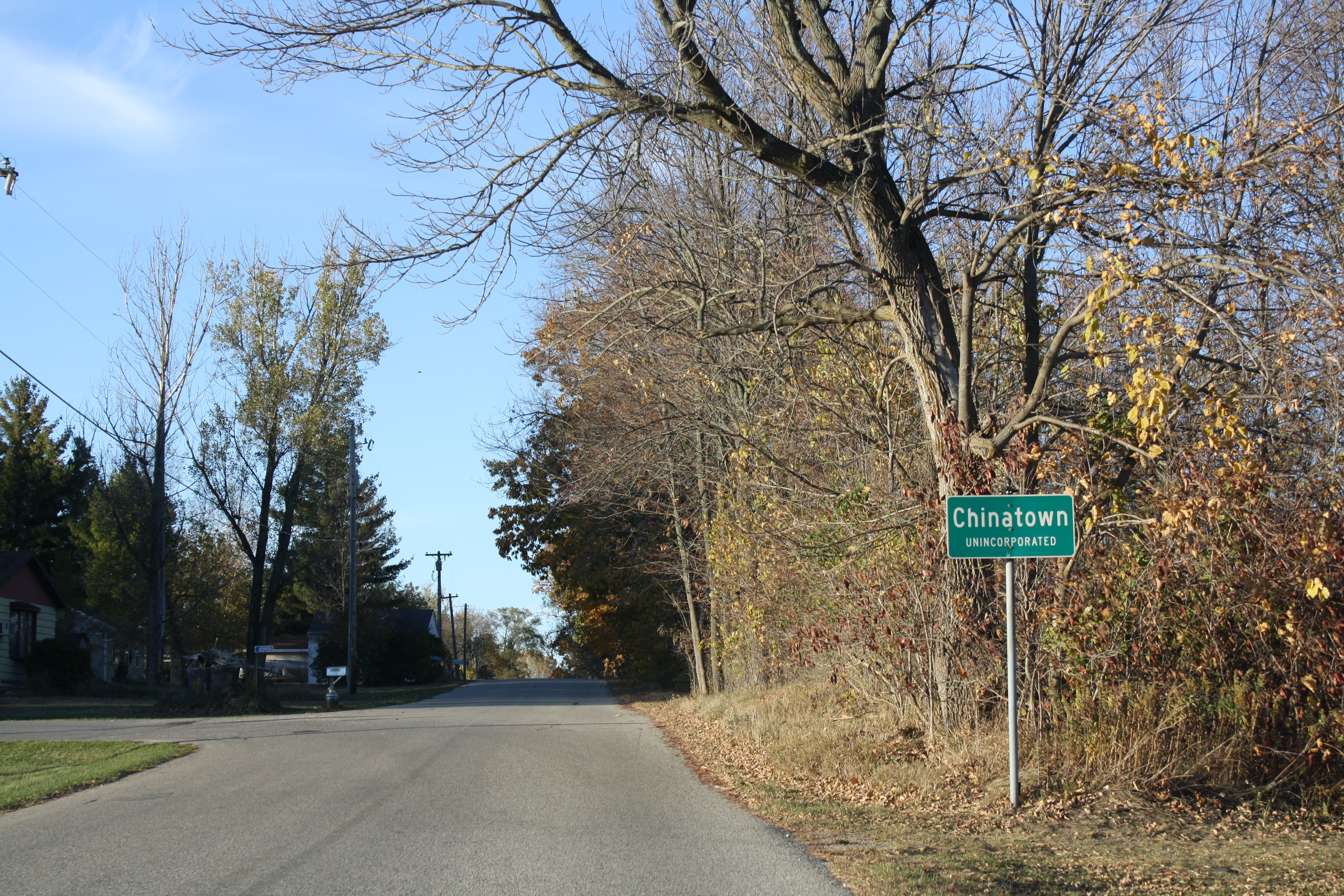
- Sign for Chinatown

- Location within Wisconsin Location within the United States
- Coordinates: 43°41′04″N 88°09′48″W
- Country: United States
- State: Wisconsin
- County: Fond du Lac
- Elevation: 1,020 ft (310 m)
- Time zone: UTC-6 (Central (CST))
  - Summer (DST): UTC-5 (CDT)
- Area code: 920
- GNIS feature ID: 2741629

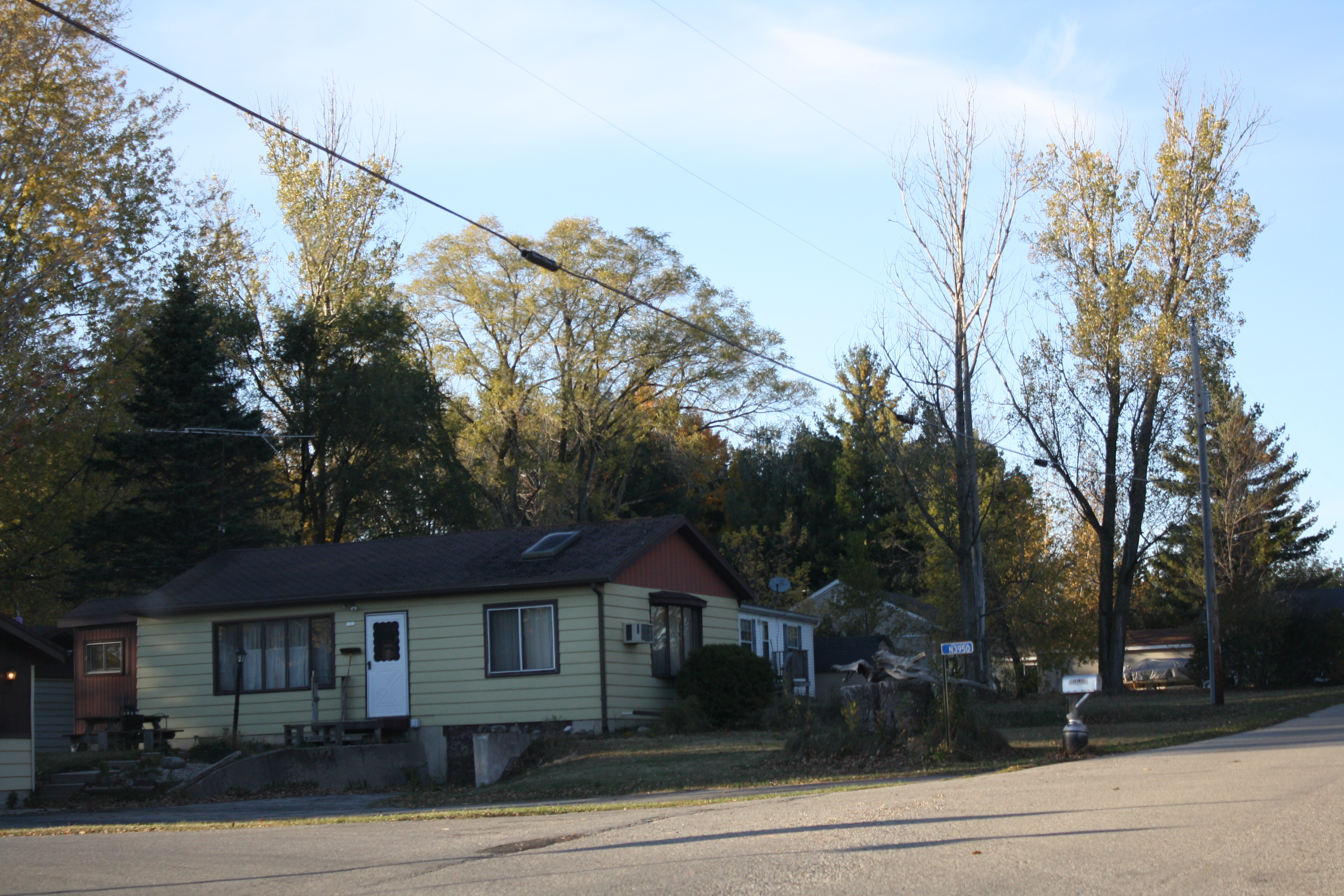
Housing in Chinatown

Chinatown is an unincorporated community in the town of Osceola, Fond du Lac County, Wisconsin, United States. Chinatown is located on the northeastern shore of Long Lake near the Sheboygan County line. Despite its name, there is no Chinatown in this area.

== Etymology ==
According to tradition, the community was named for the Oriental appearance of early lakeside houses built on stilts.
