= Daniel Cavanagh (politician) =

American politician

Daniel Cavanagh (1830 –1901) was a member of the Wisconsin State Assembly and the Wisconsin State Senate.

== Biography ==
Cavanagh was born on February 3 (or 22), 1830 in Dingle, Ireland. He would reside in Erin, Wisconsin before moving to Osceola, Fond du Lac County, Wisconsin in 1849. By trade, he was a farmer.

== Political career ==
Cavanagh was a member of the Assembly in 1870. He represented the 20th District in the Senate from 1876 to 1877. In addition, Cavanagh was elected Treasurer of Osceola in 1861 and was Chairman (similar to Mayor) of the Board of Supervisors (similar to city council) from 1864 to 1866 and again from 1869 to 1875. He was a Democrat.
