= George C. Pratt (Wisconsin pioneer) =

19th century American politician

Member of the Wisconsin Senate from the 10th district
- In office January 6, 1862 – January 4, 1864
- Preceded by: Denison Worthington
- Succeeded by: William Blair

Personal details
- Born: November 1811 Cheshire County, New Hampshire, U.S.
- Died: January 1, 1895 (aged 83) Waukesha, Wisconsin, U.S.
- Resting place: Prairie Home Cemetery, Waukesha
- Party: Democratic
- Spouse: Mary Adelia Smith (m. 1839; died 1888)
- Children: Mary Pratt^{(b. 1839; died 1925)}; Margaret S. Pratt^{(b. 1840)}; Maria Louisa Pratt^{(b. 1845)}; Susanna Cecile Pratt^{(b. 1849; died 1900)}; George Roberts Pratt^{(b. 1852; died 1904)}
- Occupation: Farmer

George Clinton Pratt (November 1811 – January 1, 1895) was an American farmer, Democratic politician, and Wisconsin pioneer. He was a member of the Wisconsin Senate, representing Waukesha County during the 1862 and 1863 sessions.

== Biography ==
George C. Pratt was born in Cheshire County, New Hampshire, in November 1811. He was raised on his family's farm, but his father died when George was about 10 years old. In his teen years, he apprenticed as a saddler and harness-maker in Vermont, then worked as a journeyman for two years in Boston, before settling at Woodstock, Vermont, until 1840.

In 1838, he made his first trip to the Wisconsin Territory, following his younger brother, Alexander, who had settled there in 1836. During his visit he invested with his brother to purchase several hundred acres of land in what is now the city of Waukesha, Wisconsin. Returning to Vermont, Pratt planned to permanently move to Wisconsin, but was delayed after he was appointed to a three-year term as deputy sheriff.

He finally brought his family to settle their land in the Wisconsin Territory in 1843. He joined his brother in the village of Milwaukee, and soon accompanied him to Waukesha (then called "Prairieville"), where they had previously purchased several hundred acres. After arriving, they purchased even more land from adjoining lots, built a second house on the property, and began farming. Within two years, they had over 300 acres cultivated and a large stock of horses, cattle, and sheep. In Wisconsin, farming was Pratt's principal employment for the next 26 years and was active in the Waukesha County Agricultural Society.

The Pratt brothers were some of the leading voices for creating a separate county from their area, and succeeded when the territorial legislature established Waukesha County from what had been the western half of Milwaukee County. Beginning shortly after the establishment of Waukesha County, Pratt and his brother held a long string of local offices.

In 1861, Pratt was the Democratic nominee for Wisconsin Senate in the 11th Senate district, which then comprised just Waukesha County. He defeated Republican Isaac Lain in the general election and went on to serve in the 1862 and 1863 legislative sessions. Pratt was renominated in 1863, but was defeated in the general election by Republican William Blair.

In 1866, Pratt was one of the founders of the Waukesha County Manufacturing Company, which produced woolen goods at a factory that ran on water power. The same year he was a co-founder of the North Prairie Petroleum Company—an unsuccessful attempt to drill for oil in the area of Genesee, Wisconsin. Later in life, he worked as a railroad purchasing agent doing business in Iowa and Missouri.

In his later years, he lost his sight but maintained otherwise good health until late 1894. He died at his home in Waukesha on January 1, 1895.

== Personal life and family ==
George C. Pratt was a son of John Pratt Jr. and his wife Nancy (née Knapp), who had come to New Hampshire from Massachusetts in 1805. John Pratt was a prominent farmer and cattle dealer in New Hampshire.

Pratt's younger brother, Alexander Foster Pratt, was one of the earliest American settlers of Waukesha, Wisconsin, and was described in the History of Waukesha County as one of the most influential Democrats in the early years of the state.

George Pratt married Mary A. Smith of New Haven, Vermont, on New Year's Day, 1839. Mary was the only child of New Haven physician Dr. Horatio A. Smith. They had at least four children.

Wisconsin Senate
Preceded by Denison Worthington	Member of the Wisconsin Senate from the 10th district January 6, 1862 – January 4, 1864	Succeeded by William Blair
