= Dundee, Wisconsin =

- Unincorporated community
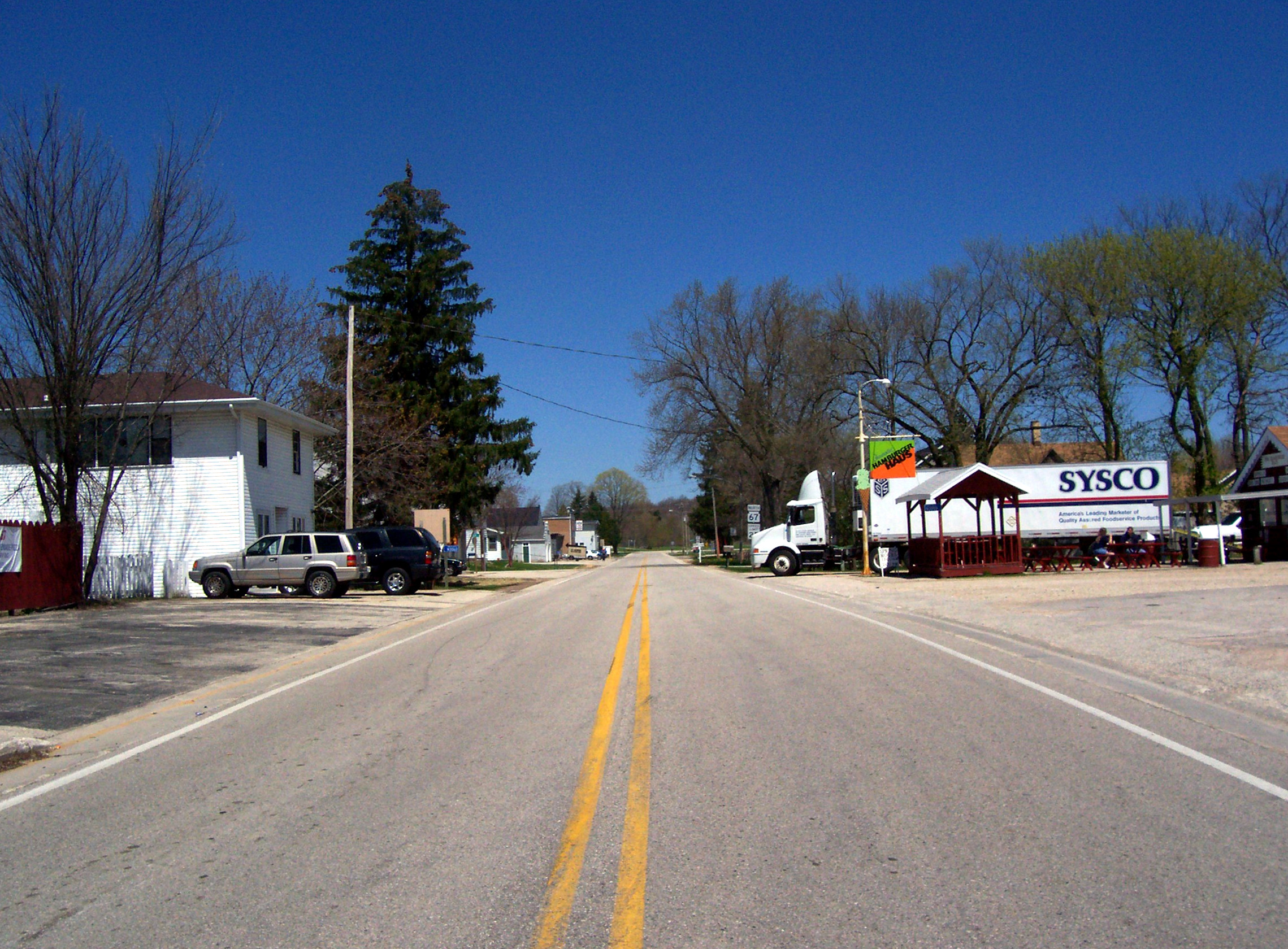
- Looking north at Dundee on Highway 67

- Location within Wisconsin Location within the United States
- Coordinates: 43°39′19″N 88°09′52″W
- Country: United States
- State: Wisconsin
- County: Fond du Lac
- Elevation: 1,230 ft (370 m)
- Time zone: UTC-6 (Central (CST))
  - Summer (DST): UTC-5 (CDT)
- Zip code: 53010
- Area code: 920
- GNIS feature ID: 1564179

Dundee is an unincorporated community located in the town of Osceola, Fond du Lac County, Wisconsin, United States. It is located on Wisconsin Highway 67 in the Kettle Moraine State Forest. The Kettle Moraine Scenic Drive runs through the community.

== Dundee Mountain ==
The local landmark Dundee Mountain is located northeast of the community. Residents gather each year for a festival called "UFO Daze."

== Extreme Makeover: Home Edition ==
In the fall of 2006, the ABC show Extreme Makeover: Home Edition traveled to Dundee to build a house for the Koepke family after Matt Koepke was diagnosed with melanoma. They built a house for the five remaining members of the family, and also renovated the nearby Dundee Mill Park.

== Notable people ==
- Fred W. Draper, member of the Wisconsin State Assembly was born in Dundee.
- Teacher and Socialist member of the State Assembly W. J. Gilboy was born on a farm near Dundee.

== Images ==
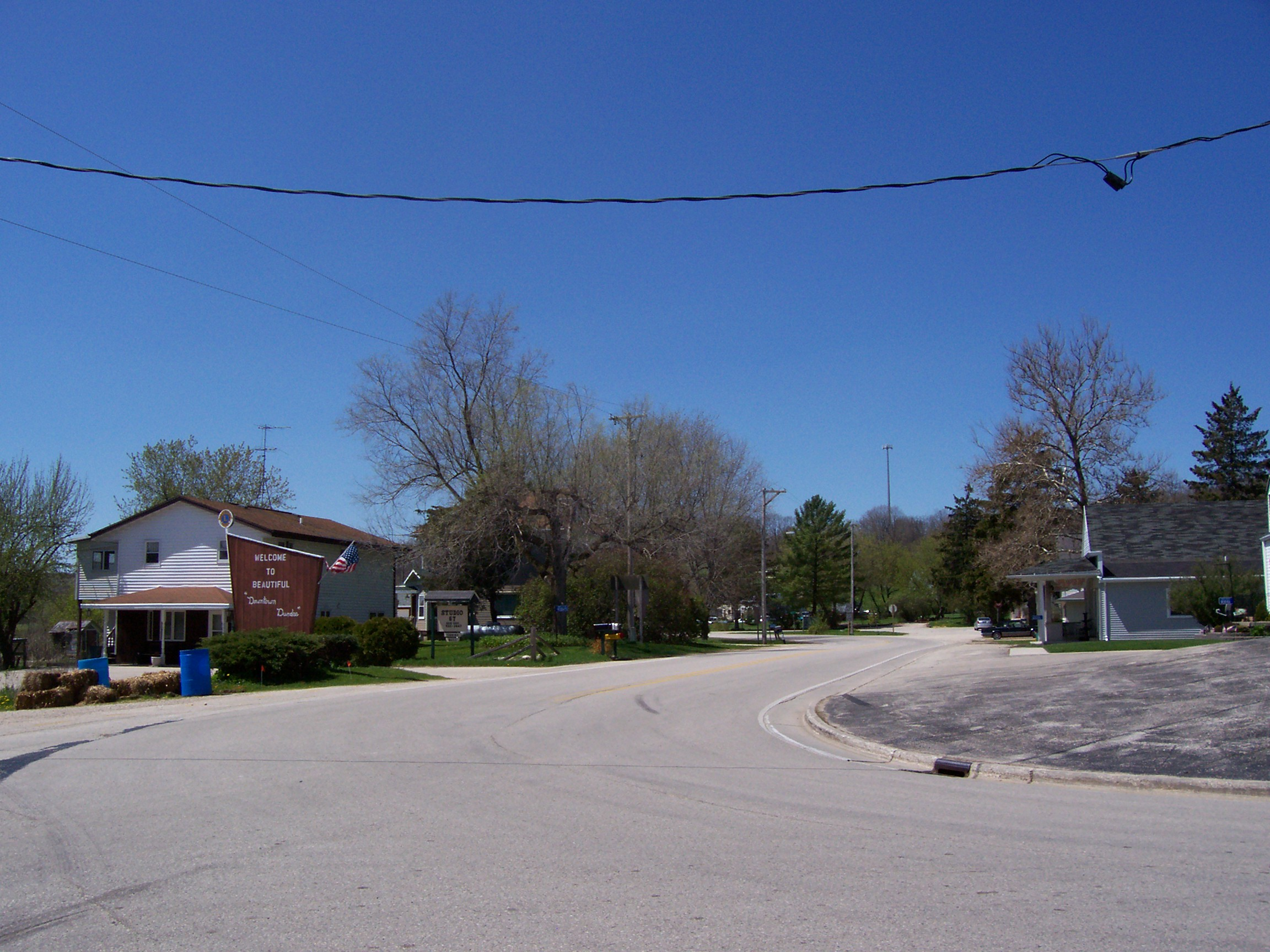
Looking west at Dundee on Wisconsin Highway 67

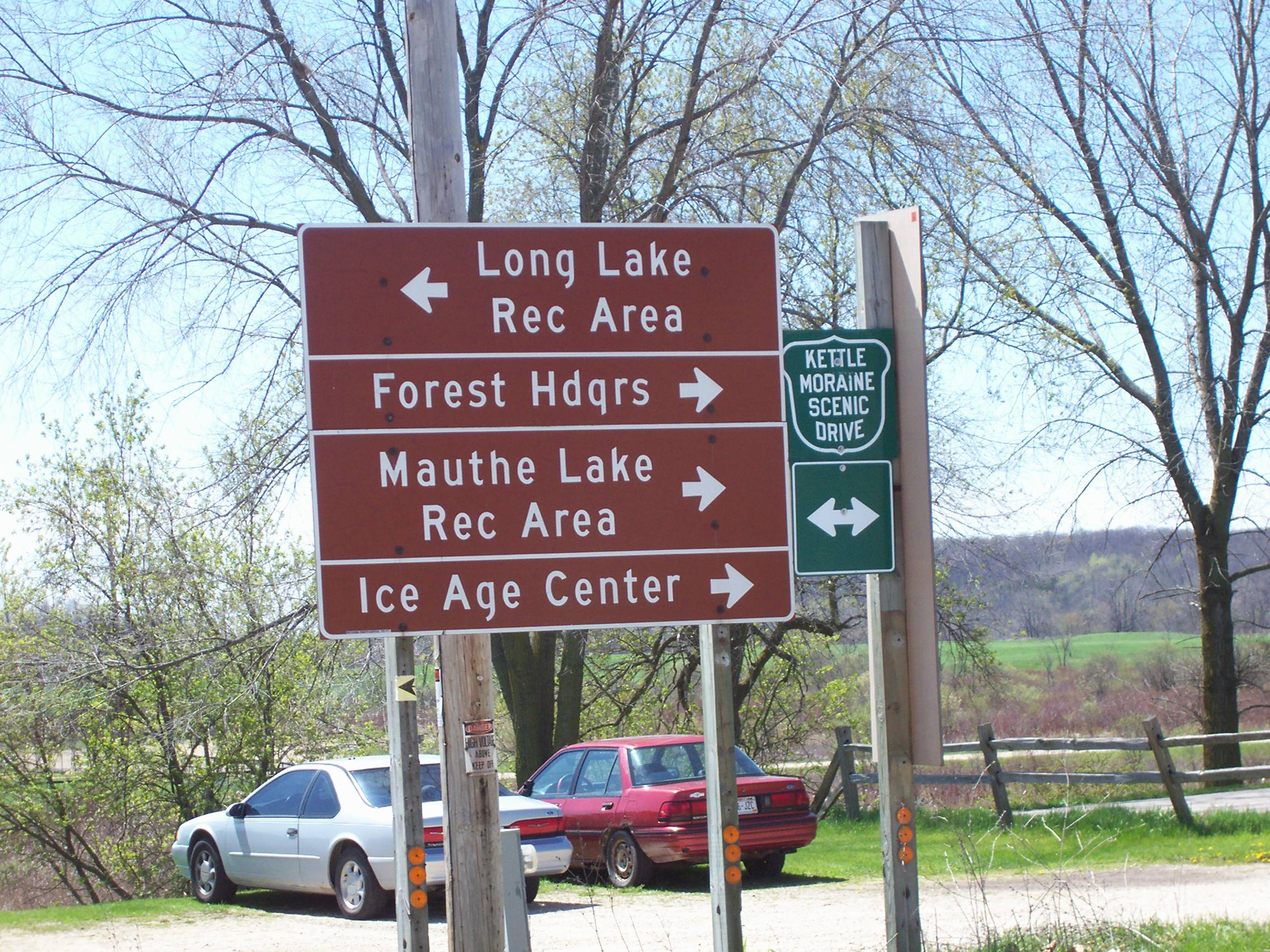
Signs for Kettle Moraine Scenic Drive and for parts of the Kettle Moraine State Forest in the heart of Dundee.

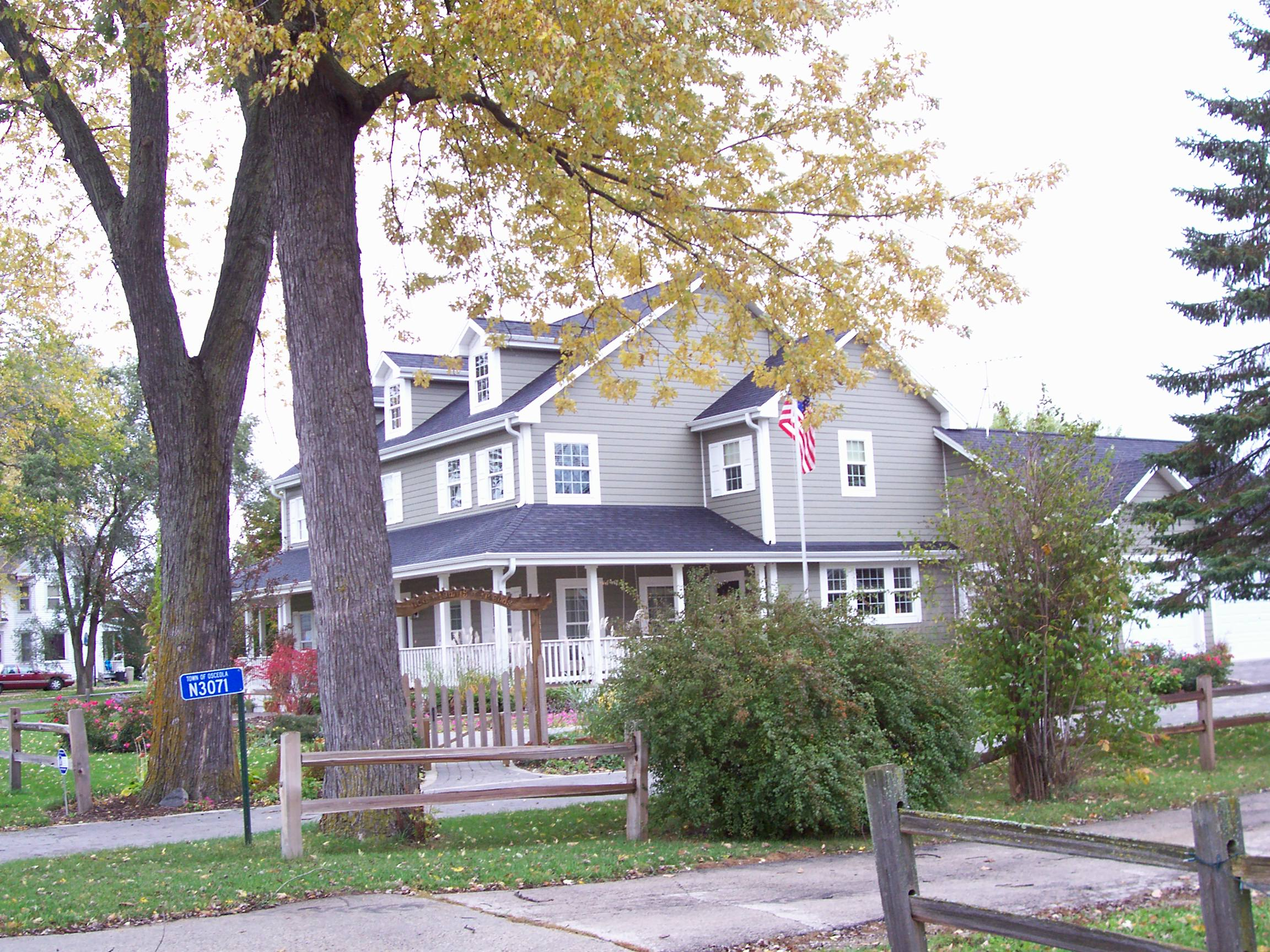
Koepke residence in 2007, site of an episode of Extreme Makeover:Home Edition

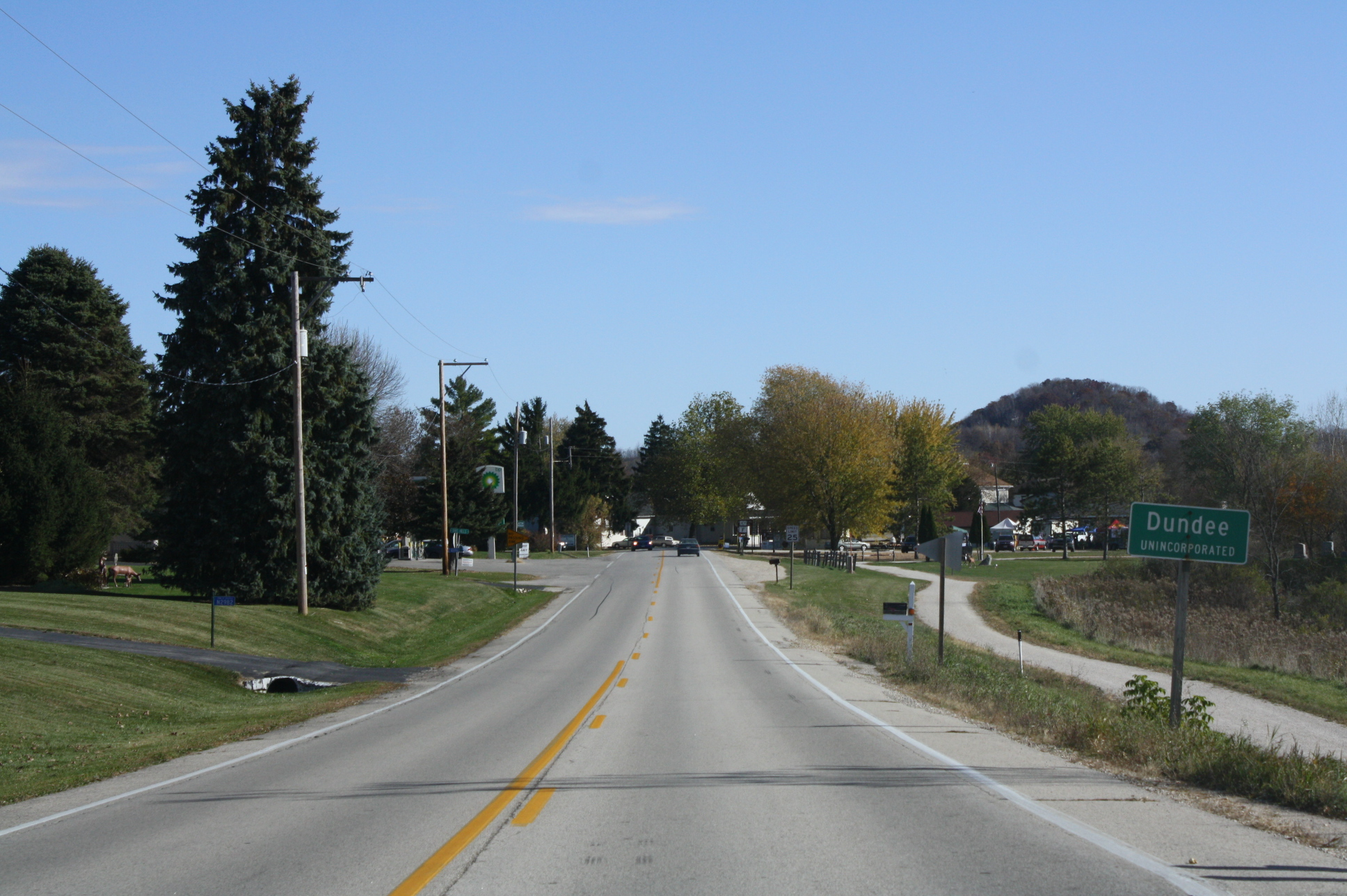
Welcome sign with Dundee Mountain in background on right
