= Waucousta, Wisconsin =

- Unincorporated community
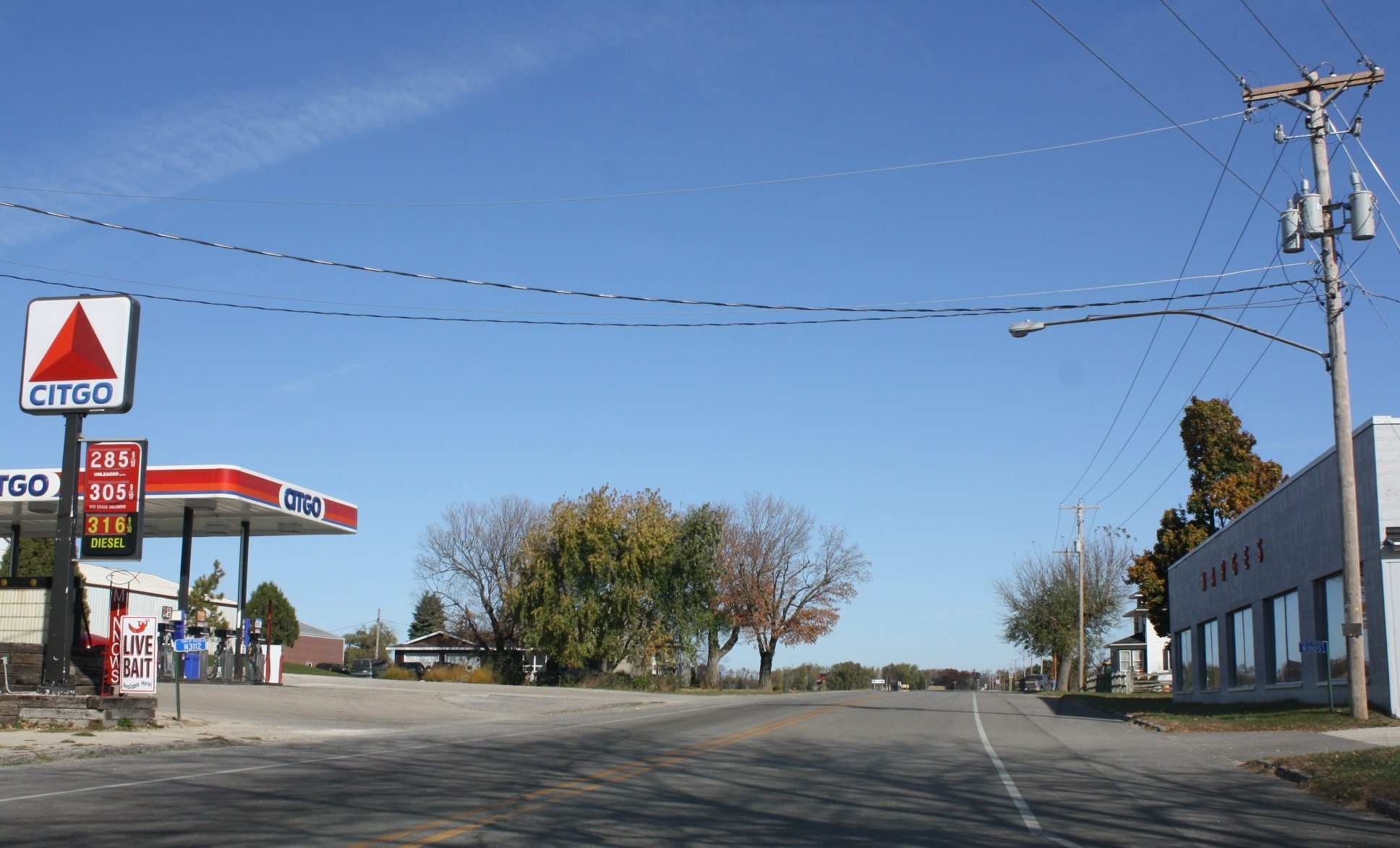
- Looking north at Waucousta on US 45

- Location within Wisconsin Location within the United States
- Coordinates: 43°39′09″N 88°15′37″W
- Country: United States
- State: Wisconsin
- County: Fond du Lac
- Elevation: 1,027 ft (313 m)
- Time zone: UTC-6 (Central (CST))
  - Summer (DST): UTC-5 (CDT)
- Area code: 920
- GNIS feature ID: 1576308

Waucousta is an unincorporated community in the town of Osceola, in Fond du Lac County, Wisconsin, United States. Waucousta is located at the junction of U.S. Route 45 and County Highway F, 4 miles (6.4 km) north-northeast of Campbellsport. A branch of the Milwaukee River runs through the community.

== Images ==
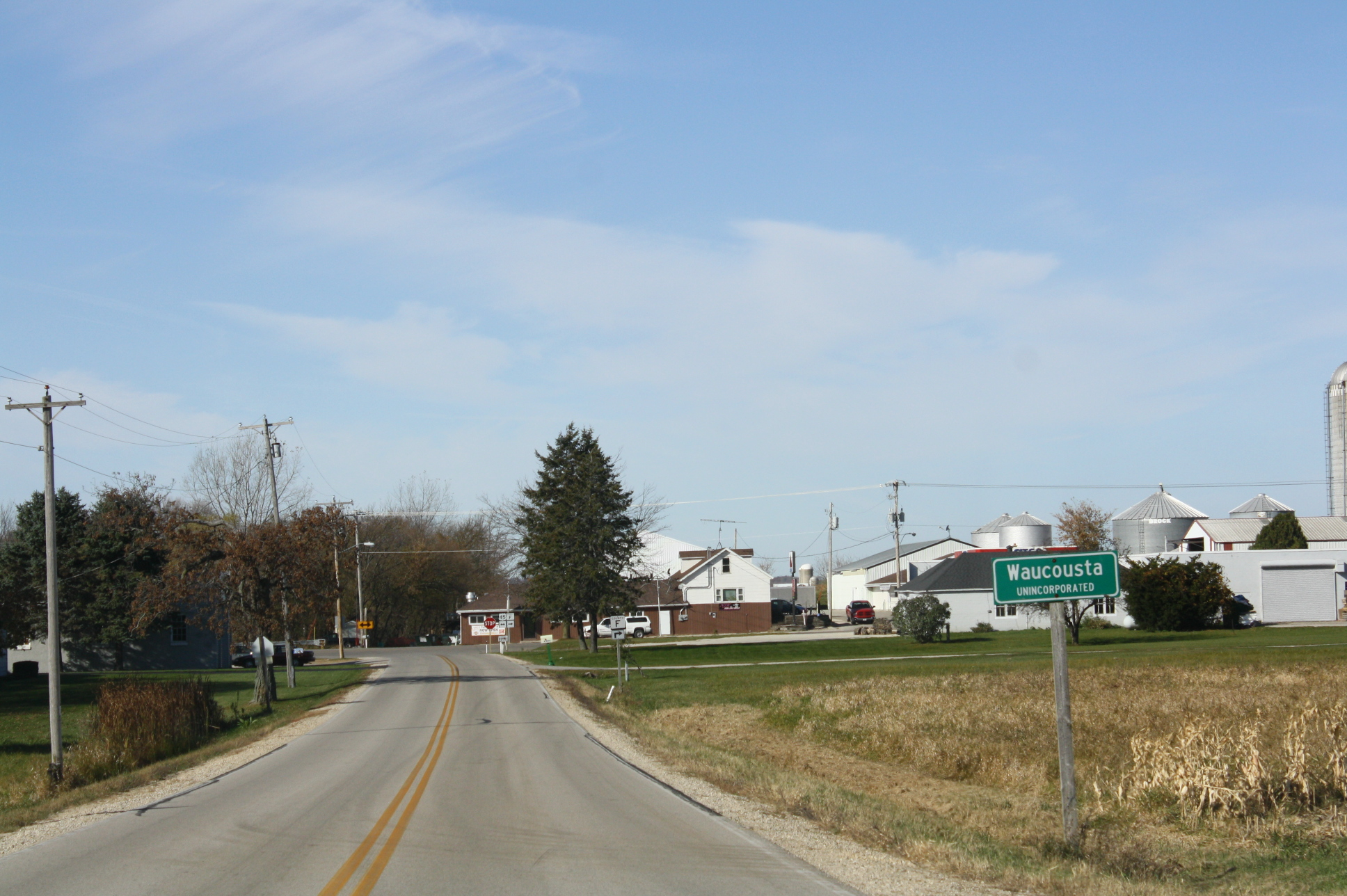
Sign for Waucousta

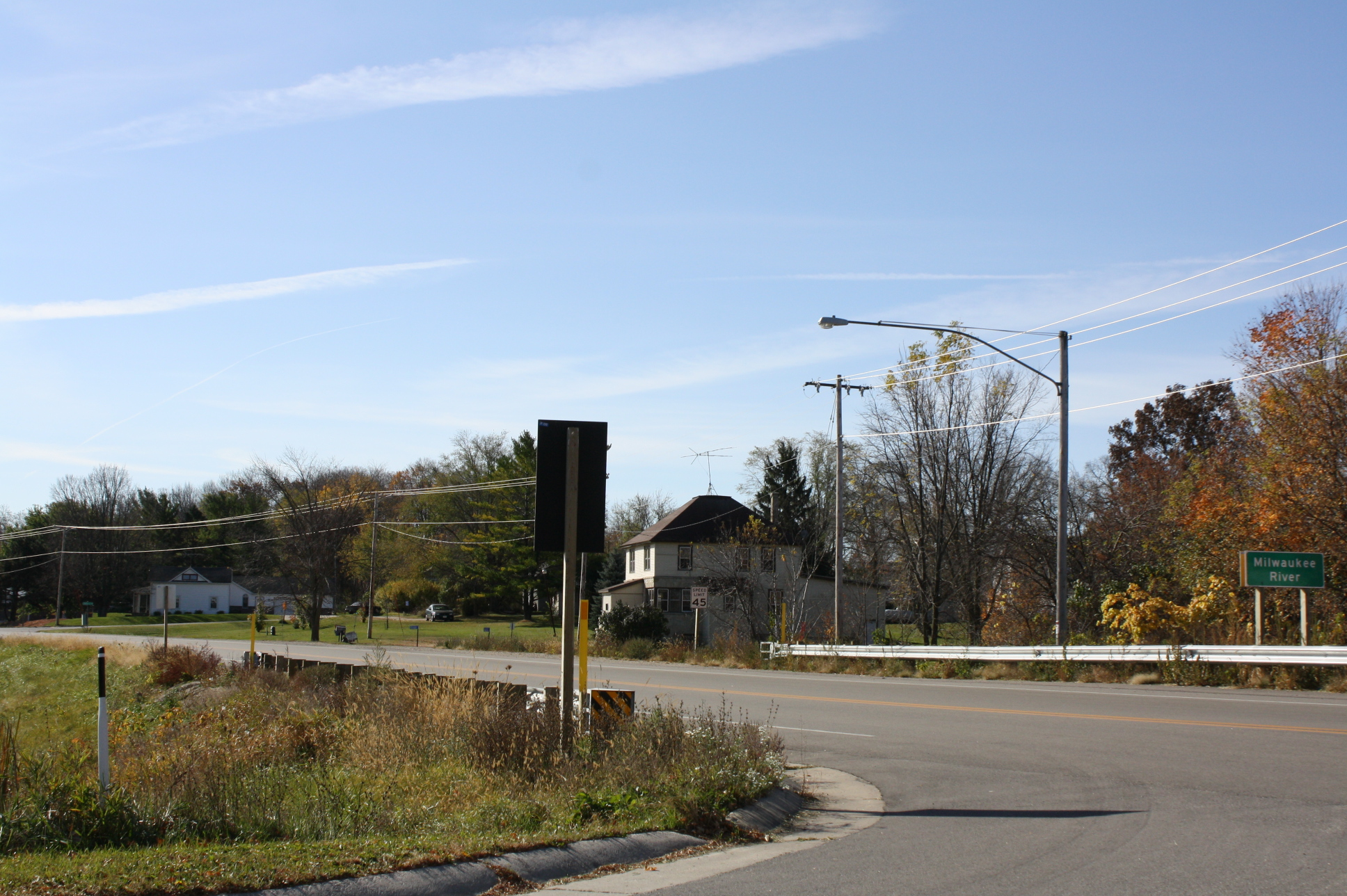
Looking south in downtown Waucousta
