= Simeon Spafard =

American politician

Simeon Spafard was a member of the Wisconsin State Assembly.

== Biography ==
Spafard was born on January 26, 1812. He died on March 3, 1880.

== Career ==
Spafard was a member of the Assembly during the Session of 1854. He was a Democrat.
