= Hilton W. Boyce =

American politician

Hilton W. Boyce (December 14, 1817 - December 6, 1874) was a member of the Wisconsin State Assembly during the Session of 1862. He was an Independent Republican.
