= Sylvester Hanson =

American politician

Sylvester Hanson was a member of the Wisconsin State Assembly, representing the 2nd district of Walworth County. He served as a Republican during the Session of 1862.
