= Brookfield (town), Wisconsin =

Town of Brookfield, Wisconsin
- Town
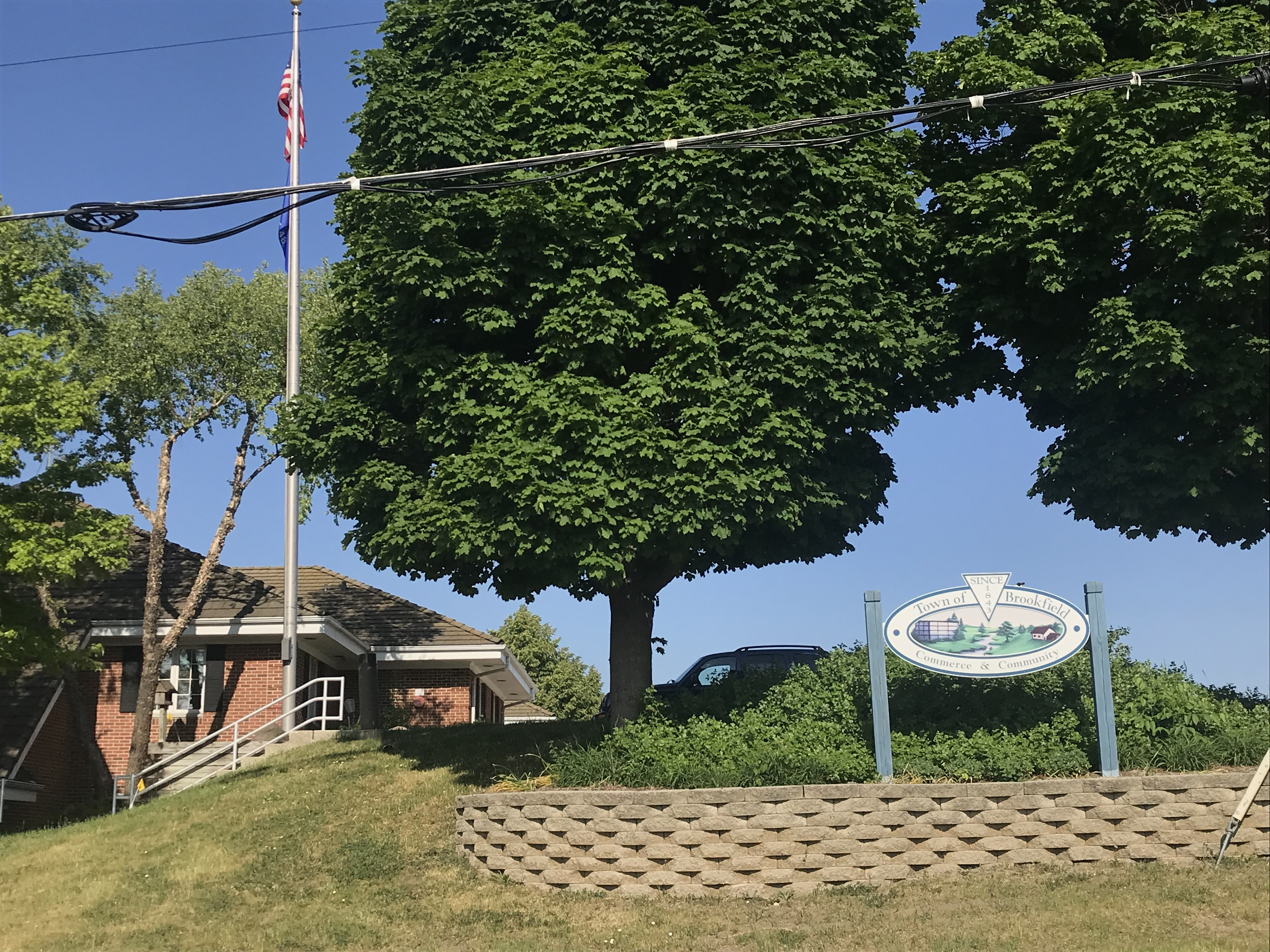
- Brookfield town hall

- Location in Waukesha County and the state of Wisconsin.
- Coordinates: 43°2′10.04″N 88°9′34.24″W
- Country: United States
- State: Wisconsin
- County: Waukesha

Government
  - Type: Council–manager government
  - Chairman: Keith Henderson

Area
  - Total: 5.06 sq mi (13.11 km^{2})
  - Land: 5.06 sq mi (13.11 km^{2})
  - Water: 0 sq mi (0.0 km^{2})
- Elevation: 830 ft (253 m)

Population (2020)
  - Total: 6,477
  - Density: 1,280/sq mi (494.2/km^{2})
- Time zone: UTC-6 (Central (CST))
  - Summer (DST): UTC-5 (CDT)
- Area code: 262
- FIPS code: 55-10050
- GNIS feature ID: 1582868
- Website: townofbrookfieldwi.gov

The Town of Brookfield is located in Waukesha County, Wisconsin, United States. The population was 6,477 at the 2020 census. The unincorporated community of Goerke's Corners is located in the town.

== History ==
The town is west of Milwaukee in Waukesha County in an area originally inhabited by Potawatomi Indians.

In May 1838, Jacques Vieux Jr., with a large party of white settlers, led the local Potawatomi west. The Wisconsin territorial legislature organized the town in 1839, although town government was not formed until 1843. By 1839, the population needed a school house. The town was served by the Milwaukee and Mississippi Railroad (now the Canadian Pacific Rail), which also erected a depot in 1853, forming the Brookfield Junction. In the year 1850, the Town of Brookfield had 1,944 inhabitants and in land area covered 36 square miles. The town slowly grew over following years. This quiet, rural atmosphere attracted one notorious resident, Al Capone, as he established an area to live and a distillery on Brookfield Road.

Development in Town of Brookfield began to increase after the Second World War, and the town continued to grow thanks to building programs and postwar population dynamics. The City of Brookfield was incorporated from 17.5 square miles of the central and eastern parts of the town on August 14, 1954. The next year, the Village of Elm Grove was also organized out of a 3.25 square mile part of the town in the east.

After continued annexation by the City of Waukesha and the City of Brookfield, by 2005 the Town of Brookfield had decreased in size to 5.5 square miles. On March 26, 2012, the town of Brookfield filed a petition to incorporate to become a village, which ultimately failed in 2015. Previous attempts in 1999 and 2001 likewise failed.

== Geography ==
According to the United States Census Bureau, the town has a total area of 5.5 square miles (14.3 km^{2}), all land.

== Demographics ==
Historical population
Census	Pop.	Note	%±
1980	4,363		—
1990	4,232		−3.0%
2000	6,390		51.0%
2010	6,116		−4.3%
2020	6,477		5.9%

Brookfield town, Wisconsin – Racial and ethnic composition Note: the US Census treats Hispanic/Latino as an ethnic category. This table excludes Latinos from the racial categories and assigns them to a separate category. Hispanics/Latinos may be of any race.
Race / Ethnicity (NH = Non-Hispanic)	Pop 2000	Pop 2010	Pop 2020	% 2000	% 2010	% 2020
White alone (NH)	5,997	5,475	5,418	93.85%	89.52%	83.65%
Black or African American alone (NH)	53	102	141	0.83%	1.67%	2.18%
Native American or Alaska Native alone (NH)	2	3	11	0.03%	0.05%	0.17%
Asian alone (NH)	204	355	447	3.19%	5.80%	6.90%
Pacific Islander alone (NH)	1	3	0	0.02%	0.05%	0.00%
Other race alone (NH)	2	7	13	0.03%	0.11%	0.20%
Mixed race or Multiracial (NH)	51	61	183	0.80%	1.00%	2.83%
Hispanic or Latino (any race)	80	110	264	1.25%	1.80%	4.08%
Total	6,390	6,116	6,477	100.00%	100.00%	100.00%

=== 2000 census ===
At the 2000 census there were 6,390 people, 2,762 households, and 1,762 families in the town. The population density was 1,160.3 people per square mile (447.8/km^{2}). There were 2,863 housing units at an average density of 519.8 per square mile (200.6/km^{2}). The racial makeup of the town was 94.63% White, 0.83% Black or African American, 0.03% Native American, 3.19% Asian, 0.02% Pacific Islander, 0.42% from other races, and 0.88% from two or more races. 1.25% of the population were Hispanic or Latino of any race. Of the 2,762 households 24.5% had children under the age of 18 living with them, 57.5% were married couples living together, 4.3% had a female householder with no husband present, and 36.2% were non-families. 32.3% of households were one person and 22.4% were one person aged 65 or older. The average household size was 2.29 and the average family size was 2.93.

The age distribution was 22.0% under the age of 18, 4.3% from 18 to 24, 24.8% from 25 to 44, 24.3% from 45 to 64, and 24.7% 65 or older. The median age was 44 years. For every 100 females, there were 86.8 males. For every 100 females age 18 and over, there were 82.5 males.

The median household income was $65,417 and the median family income was $83,036. Males had a median income of $63,661 versus $47,591 for females. The per capita income for the town was $38,608. About 2.1% of families and 3.1% of the population were below the poverty line, including 2.3% of those under age 18 and 4.1% of those age 65 or over.

== Religion ==
The town is the home of Elmbrook Church, the largest church in Wisconsin and one of the 100-largest in the United States.

== Notable people ==
- Caroline Ingalls (1839–1923), mother of Laura Ingalls Wilder, was born in the Town of Brookfield, (then the city now town again) She was descended from pioneers who could trace their ancestry to the Mayflower. There is a description of her life, Little House in Brookfield, patterned after the highly successful Little House on the Prairie. Quiner's birthplace stood near today's intersection of Davidson Road and Brookfield Road, in the southwestern part of the city

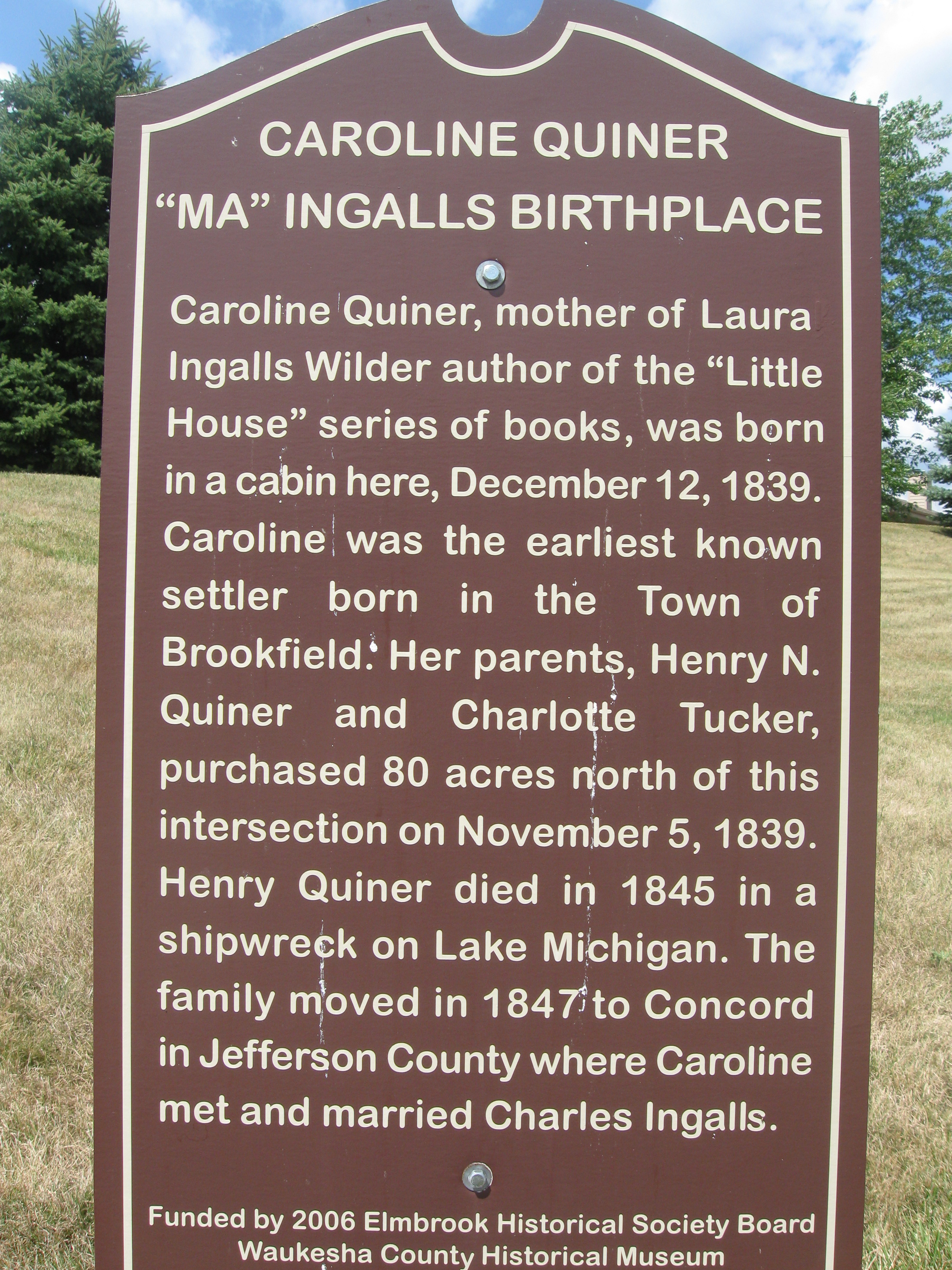
Historical marker at the place of Caroline Ingalls' birth located on an intersection

- Katrina Kozar, MasterChef (U.S. season 6) contestant, lived in the Town at the time of her TV appearance
- William H. Steele, Wisconsin State Representative and farmer, was born in the town
