= 2nd Wisconsin Infantry Regiment =

Union Army infantry regiment

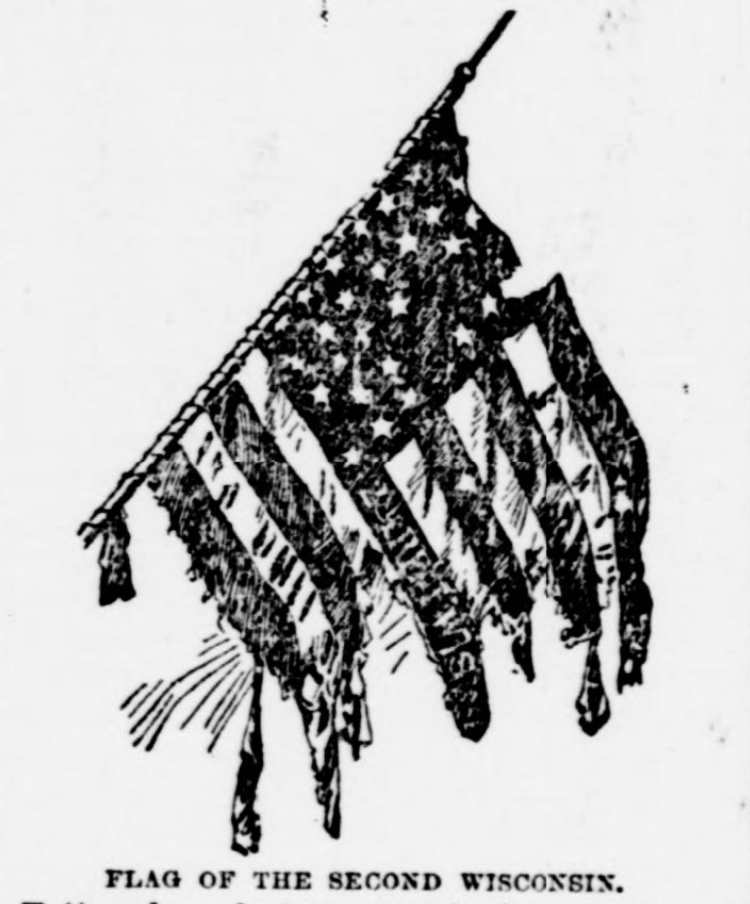
- National Flag
- Active: June 11, 1861 – July 2, 1864
- Country: United States
- Allegiance: Union
- Branch: Infantry
- Size: Regiment
- Nickname: "Ragged Asstetical" or "Ragged Ass Second"
- Engagements: American Civil War: Manassas campaign; Battle of Blackburn's Ford; First Battle of Bull Run; Northern Virginia campaign; First Battle of Rappahannock Station; Second Battle of Bull Run; Maryland campaign; Battle of South Mountain; Battle of Antietam; Battle of Fredericksburg; Battle of Chancellorsville; Battle of Gettysburg; Bristoe campaign; Mine Run campaign; Overland Campaign; Battle of the Wilderness; Battle of Spotsylvania Court House; Battle of North Anna; Battle of Cold Harbor

Commanders
- Colonel: S. Park Coon
- Colonel: Edgar O'Connor
- Colonel: Lucius Fairchild
- Colonel: John Mansfield
- Colonel: George B. Ely

Insignia
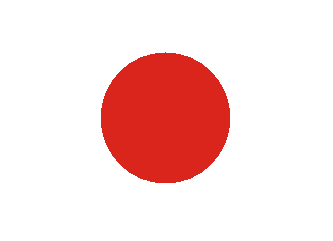
- I Corps badge (1st Division)

The 2nd Wisconsin Infantry Regiment was a volunteer infantry regiment that served in the Union Army during the American Civil War. It spent most of the war as a component of the famous Iron Brigade of the Army of the Potomac, and participated in most of the critical battles of the eastern theater of the war, including Antietam, Gettysburg, and Grant's Overland Campaign. It suffered the largest number of casualties as a percentage of its total enlistment of any Union Army unit in the war. The casualties reduced the regiment to an "Independent Battalion" of two companies by July 1864, and the remaining battalion was consolidated into the 6th Wisconsin Infantry Regiment in November 1864.

== Establishment ==
Following the Battle of Fort Sumter, on April 16, 1861, President Abraham Lincoln issued a proclamation to call for 75,000 volunteers to put down the rebellion. Pursuant to that proclamation, the War Department requested each state provide a certain number of regiments of volunteers—they requested one regiment from the state of Wisconsin. However, following Wisconsin Governor Alexander Randall's call to arms, 36 companies of men were enrolled to volunteer for the war effort—enough for more than three regiments. The Second Wisconsin Infantry Regiment was the second unit created from these original volunteer companies. The regiment was organized at Camp Randall, in Madison, Wisconsin, primarily composed of companies from Madison, Racine, Milwaukee, Oshkosh, and La Crosse.

Governor Randall appointed 41-year-old S. Park Coon colonel of the new regiment—Coon was a native of New York, had served as Wisconsin's 2nd Attorney General, and was an influential Milwaukee County Democrat. The lieutenant colonel, Henry W. Peck, was from Ohio and had graduated from the United States Military Academy at West Point in 1851—Peck provided some professional military experience and training, versus the political appointee Coon.

The regiment formally mustered into federal service on June 11, 1861. Although President Lincoln's original request was for three-month volunteers, by June the need had become apparent for longer enlistments, and the 2nd Wisconsin was mustered as a three-year regiment.

== Service ==
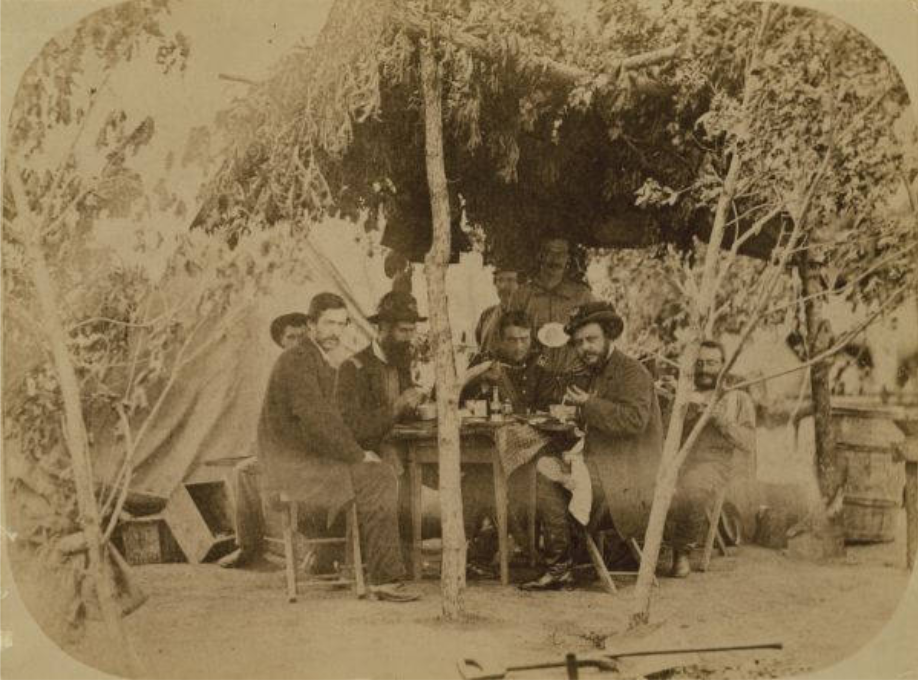
Field officers of the 2nd Wisconsin Vol. Infantry, photographed at a camp in northern Virginia circa 1862. The officers seated, from left, are surgeon A. J. Ward, Major Thomas S. Allen, Lt. Colonel Lucius Fairchild, and Colonel Edgar O'Connor.

The regiment was transported to Washington, D.C., and saw its first combat at the First Battle of Bull Run in July 1861 in a brigade under William T. Sherman. At the battle some of the men wore state militia grey uniforms, causing the 2nd Wisconsin to receive friendly fire from Union troops mistaking them for Confederates. Coon, never comfortable in his role as a military man, resigned July 30 to return to politics. Peck and the major also resigned, all were considered victims of the regiment's poor performance at Bull Run. Three new field officers replaced them—Col. Edgar O'Connor, Lt. Col. Fairchild, and Maj. Thomas S. Allen. The appointment of O'Connor, married to a Southern woman and an outspoken Democrat, was met with sharp criticism in Wisconsin's media, particularly in the Republican newspapers. He would prove to be a brave and competent leader, however, and was killed in action in Virginia in late summer 1862. Lt. Col. Fairchild was promoted to the rank of full colonel on September 8, 1862, to become the third commander of the 2nd Wisconsin Volunteers.

The regiment suffered severe casualties during the 1862 Northern Virginia Campaign, fighting against Stonewall Jackson's Confederates at the Battle of Groveton. The 2nd would advance alone, against superior forces. when it was joined by the rest of the Brigade, it had suffered heavily, the 2nd would lose 276 men killed or wounded out of a total strength of 430. The regiment would see more action at the Second Battle of Bull Run. During the subsequent Maryland Campaign, the 2nd Wisconsin attacked Turner's Gap during the Battle of South Mountain, and then again took high casualties in the Cornfield at Antietam.

Perhaps the regiment's finest hour came at Gettysburg, where it lost 77% of its strength (233 casualties out of 302 effectives) in stubborn fighting on McPherson's Ridge during the Iron Brigade's lengthy action on July 1, 1863. Where it assaulted McPherson's Woods and drove back a Brigade under the command of James J. Archer, capturing most of his Brigade and Archer himself, who was captured by Patrick Maloney. A young Irishman in the 2nd, Patrick would be awarded the Medal of Honor for his actions. Sadly, Patrick Maloney would not live to see the sunrise of July 2. The 2nd would be counterattacked in the late afternoon, and would be forced back, but not without putting up a stubborn fight. Colonel Fairchild lost an arm due to a severe wound, and most of the line officers went down as well. The regiment reformed on Culp's Hill and entrenched for the rest of the battle. Although the 2nd Wisconsin was able to replenish some of its losses, it was never the same fighting force again. It later served in the Bristoe and Mine Run campaigns. The final campaign for the 2nd Wisconsin was Grant's bloody Overland Campaign.

With the regiment's original three-year enlistments expiring on June 11, 1864, those who chose not to re-enlist were sent back to Madison, with the final company mustering out on July 2, 1864. Newer recruits and re-enlisted veterans were restructured into a battalion of two companies, first under the command of Captain Dennis B. Dailey, then under Lt. Albert T. Morgan, and finally Lt. Henry Naegly. The battalion participated in the Siege of Petersburg—suffering several more casualties during that campaign—until they were ultimately consolidated into the 6th Wisconsin Infantry Regiment on November 30, 1864.

== Commanders ==
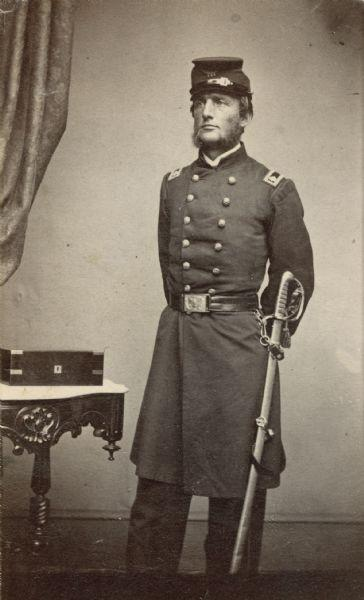
Lucius Fairchild, before his promotion to colonel on November 17, 1862

- Colonel S. Park Coon (April 24, 1861 – July 30, 1861) resigned. Before the war, he was the 2nd attorney general of Wisconsin, and after the war he served a term as district attorney of Milwaukee County.
- Colonel Edgar O'Connor (August 3, 1861 – August 28, 1862) was killed in action at Gainesville, Virginia, during the Second Battle of Bull Run.
- Colonel Lucius Fairchild (September 8, 1862 – October 20, 1863) began the war as captain of Co. K, 1st Wisconsin Infantry, and joined the 2nd Wisconsin Infantry as major. He lost an arm at Gettysburg and was promoted to brigadier general by President Lincoln. After the war he became the first three-term governor of Wisconsin and, later, was appointed U.S. Minister to Spain.
- Colonel John Mansfield (February 9, 1864 – August 14, 1864) began the war as captain of Co. G. Mustered out with the regiment as Colonel. Later became the 15th lieutenant governor of California.

== Total enlistments and casualties ==
The 2nd Wisconsin Infantry initially mustered 1,051 men and later recruited an additional 152 men, for a total of 1,203 men. The regiment lost 10 officers and 228 enlisted men killed in action or who later died of their wounds, plus another 77 enlisted men who died of disease, for a total of 315 fatalities.

2nd Wisconsin Infantry, Company Organization
Company	Original Moniker	Primary Place of Recruitment	Captain(s)
A	Citizens Guard, Fox Lake	Fox Lake, Columbia, Dodge, and Dane counties	George H. Stevens (promoted); Henry B. Converse (wounded–discharged); William W. Jones (wounded–transferred); Alured Larke (mustered out)
B	La Crosse Light Guards	La Crosse and La Crosse County	Wilson Colwell (KIA); Robert H. Hughes (KIA); Dennis B. Dailey (transferred)
C	Grant County Grays	Boscobel, Potosi, Lancaster, and Grant County	David McKee (KIA); George W. Gibson (mustered out)
D	Janesville Volunteers	Janesville and Rock County	George Byron Ely (wounded–transferred); James D. Wood (transferred); Ebenezer P. Perry (mustered out)
E	Oshkosh Volunteers	Oshkosh and Winnebago County	Gabriel Bouck (transferred); Lyman H. Smith (wounded–discharged); Melvin R. Baldwin (mustered out)
F	Belle City Rifles	Racine and Racine County	William Emerson Strong (transferred); William L. Parsons (promoted); Martin L. Gorman (mustered out)
G	Portage City Guards	Portage and Columbia County	John Mansfield (promoted); Alexander S. Hill (wounded–resigned); Charles C. Dow (mustered out)
H	Randall Guards	Dane, Columbia, and Rock counties	Julius Fritz Randolph (KIA); Nathaniel Rollins (mustered out)
I	Miner's Guards	Mineral Point, Dodgeville, and Iowa County	Thomas Scott Allen (promoted); William A. La Fleische (resigned); George H. Otis (mustered out)
K	Wisconsin Rifles	Jefferson, Dane, Winnebago, Columbia, and Rock counties	Andrew J. Langworthy (wounded); John Stahel (resigned); John R. Spoerri (KIA)

2nd Wisconsin Independent Battalion Organization
Company	Captain(s)
A	Dennis B. Dailey (transferred)
B	Albert T. Morgan (transferred)

== Nicknames ==
According to a veteran of the 2nd Wisconsin, Cullen B. Aubery, the 2nd Wisconsin Infantry Regiment's nickname was the "Ragged Asstetical". According to Aubery this came “from the fact that the government contractors had run short of good material when they made the pantaloons”, giving the 2nd Wisconsin a raggedy appearance when on parade. Another common nickname closely associated with the 2nd Wisconsin would be the "Ragged Ass Second", a contraction of the former moniker.

== Uniform ==
The 2nd Wisconsin Infantry Regiment had a wide variety of unique uniforms during its service from 1861-1865, among them were the continual use of the iconic Hardee hat which gave the regiment and the rest of the Iron Brigade the iconic nickname "The Black Hats". According to American historian Alan D. Gaff, author of If This is War: a History of the Campaign of Bull's Run by the Wisconsin Regiment Thereafter known as the Ragged Ass Second, the 2nd Wisconsin had the following uniforms when it was originally mustered into service on June 11, 1861:

- Co. A – Citizens Guard (Fox Lake): Arrived at Camp Randall with two thirds of the men wearing gray suits, trimmed with red, having red epaulets, and blue caps similar to 7th New York Infantry Regiment.
- Co. B – La Crosse Light Guard: Gray coats and pants trimmed with black, dark blue caps. Glazed linen havelocks.
- Co. C – Grant County Grays: Arrive at Camp Randall unequipped
- Co. D – Janesville Volunteers: Arrive at Camp Randall in civilian clothes. Janesville later contracted with a manufacturer for 78 uniforms that had coats and pants made of gray cloth “in the regulation pattern.” Ladies of Janesville made the men shirts, and various Janesville shops supplied shoes.
- Co. E – Oshkosh Volunteers: Arrived at Camp Randall with no equipment or arms
- Co. F – Belle City Rifles (Racine): Arrive at Camp Randall without arms or uniforms. The uniforms components they later received were made of various shades of gray, and did not make for a uniform appearance.
- Co. G – Portage Light Guard: Dark gray coats, caps of the same material, black pantaloons, all trimmed with red. Every man received a havelock, sewn by the ladies of Portage.
- Co. H – Randall Guards: Gray cap, coat, and pants with black stripe on pants and black cloth buttons on coat.
- Co. I – Miner’s Guard (Iowa County): Arrive wearing matching gray pants with a narrow stripe.
- Co. K* – Wisconsin Rifles (Milwaukee): Arrived at Camp Randall wearing dark pants and red shirts.

Due to the 2nd Wisconsin being involved in many issues of friendly fire during the First Battle of Bull Run the uniform was officially changed from the militia gray uniform to the official United States Army uniform. The "official" Iron Brigade uniform in October 1861 consisted of a Hardee hat, the M1858 9-button infantry frock coat, and regulation dark blue trousers. This uniform would be the most iconic uniform utilized by the 2nd Wisconsin for much of the regiments service, although the trousers were later phased out for the standard issue 1861 regulation trousers.

By 1863 during the Gettysburg campaign the 2nd Wisconsin's uniform had largely changed to the standard issue uniform of the Union's Army of the Potomac while still retaining their iconic Hardee hat as a part of their regimental identity.

== Notable people ==
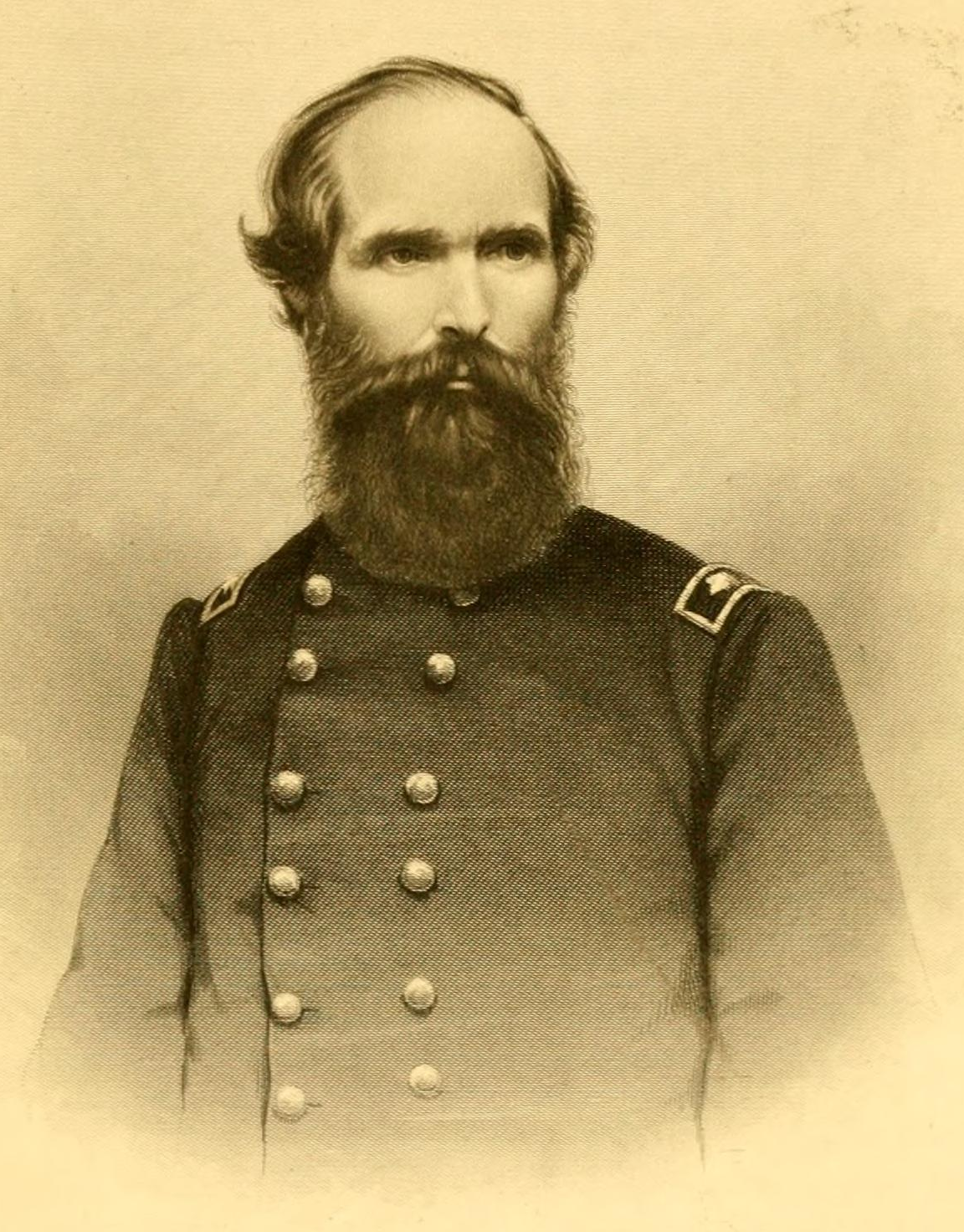
Thomas S. Allen

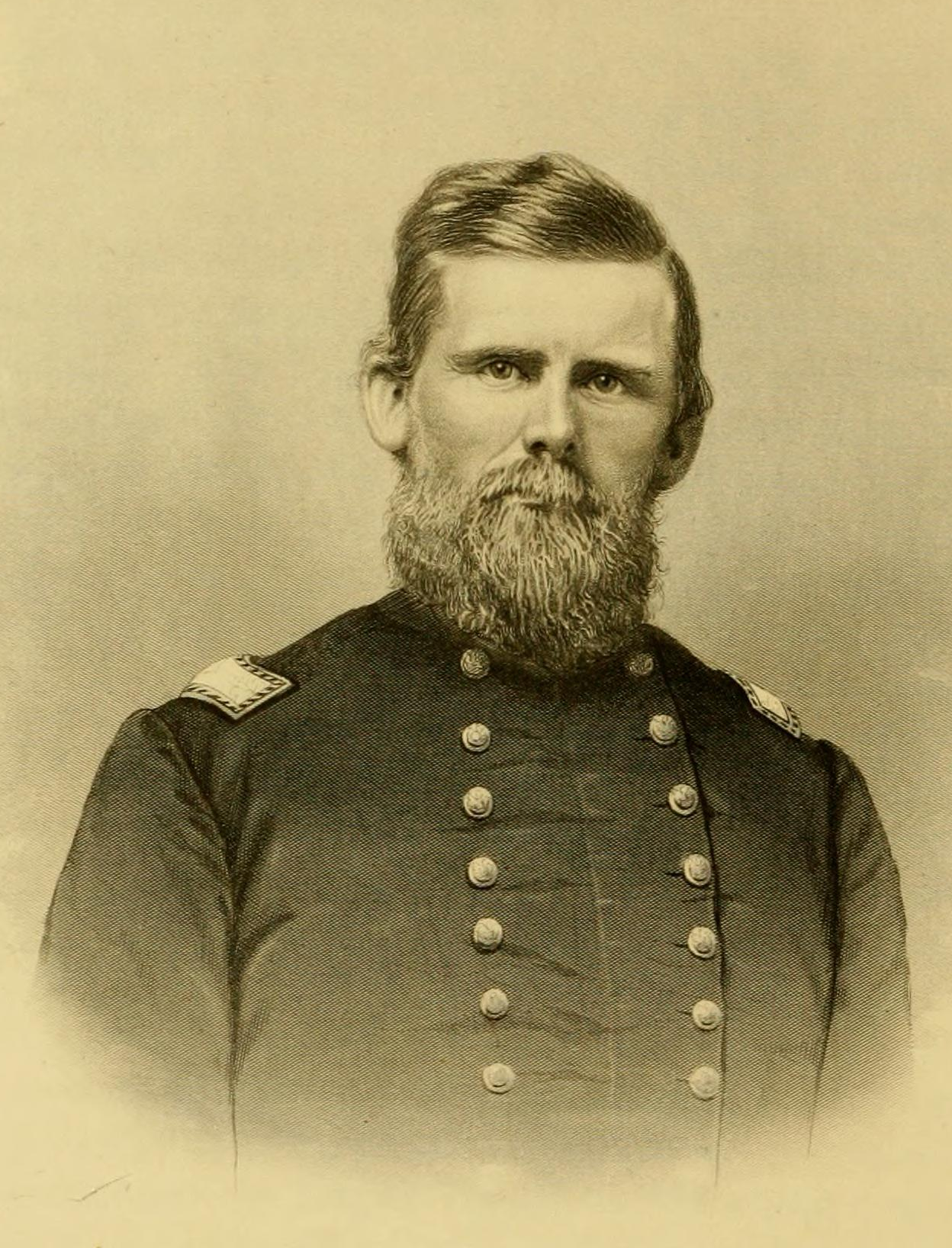
David McKee

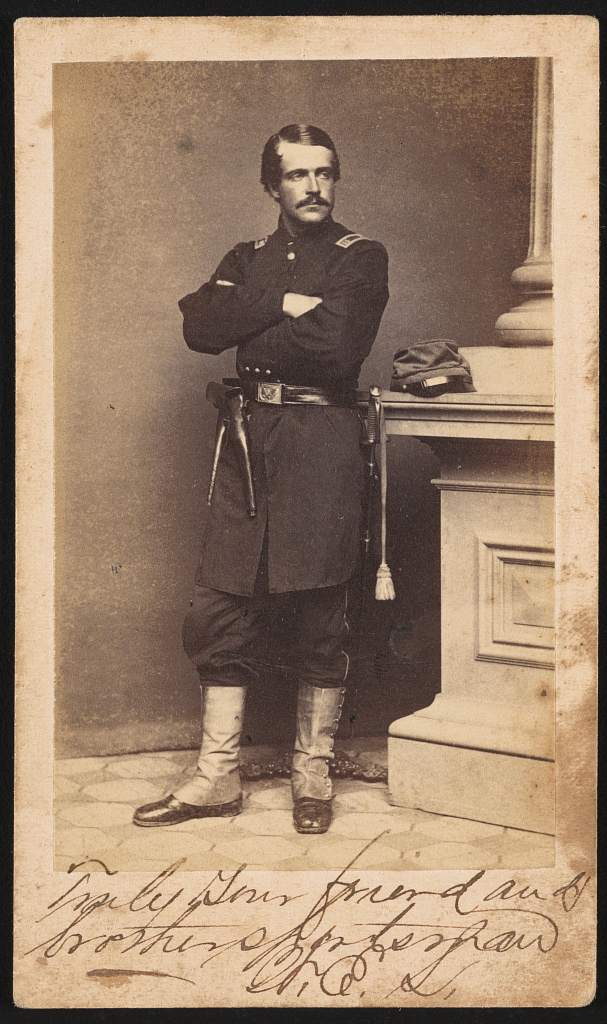
William E. Strong
- Thomas S. Allen was captain of Co. I and later colonel of the 5th Wisconsin Infantry Regiment. He received an honorary brevet to brigadier general. After the war he was elected Secretary of State of Wisconsin.
- Allen S. Baker was a private in Co. H and was wounded at Gettysburg. After the war he became a Wisconsin state legislator.
- Melvin Baldwin was enlisted in Co. E and was wounded at Gainesville. Later he was detached as chief of the division's ambulance corps, he returned to the regiment and was later commissioned captain of Co. E. He was captured by the enemy at Gettysburg and was a prisoner of war for 18 months. After the war he became a U.S. congressman from Minnesota.
- Joseph Bock was a private in Co. C and was wounded at Gainesville. After the war he became a Wisconsin state legislator.
- Gabriel Bouck was captain of Co. E and later colonel of the 18th Wisconsin Infantry Regiment. After the war he became a U.S. congressman and Speaker of the Wisconsin State Assembly.
- Norton J. Field was sergeant and later 1st sergeant in Co. F. After the war he became a Wisconsin state legislator.
- William H. Harries enlisted in Co. B and was wounded at Antietam. Later he was commissioned as 2nd lieutenant and promoted to 1st lieutenant of that same company. After the war he became a U.S. congressman from Minnesota.
- Henry B. Harshaw enlisted in Co. E and was commissioned 2nd lieutenant of the company in March 1863. He lost his left arm at the Battle of Chaffin's Farm. After the war he was elected State Treasurer of Wisconsin.
- George M. Humphrey was enlisted in Co. H and was wounded at First Bull Run. Later he was commissioned as 1st lieutenant of Co. H. After the war he was Speaker of the Nebraska House of Representatives.
- John Johnson was a private in Co. D, but served most of the war detached to the 4th U.S. Artillery, Battery B. He received the Medal of Honor for actions at the Antietam and Fredericksburg, where he lost his right arm.
- David McKee was captain of Co. C, and was later commissioned lieutenant colonel of the 15th Wisconsin Infantry Regiment. He was killed at the Battle of Stones River.
- Fordyce R. Melvin was a private in Co. D and was wounded at First Bull Run. He later re-enlisted with the 24th New York Infantry Regiment. After the war he became a Wisconsin state legislator.
- Albert T. Morgan was 1st lieutenant in Co. A and later a captain in the independent battalion, and was captain of Co. H in the 6th Wisconsin Infantry Regiment after that regiment absorbed the independent battalion. After the war he worked to enfranchise freedmen in Mississippi during Reconstruction, but was chased out of the state by White terrorism in the 1870s. He later wrote a memoir of his experiences.
- Patrick Henry Ray was a private in Co. K but was transferred to the 1st Wisconsin Heavy Artillery Regiment in December 1861. He rose to the rank of captain in the 1st Wisconsin Heavy Artillery and remained in the U.S. Army after the war, and achieved the rank of brigadier general in 1906.
- William Emerson Strong was captain of Co. F, but was transferred to the 12th Wisconsin Infantry Regiment in September 1861.
- George G. Symes was a private in Co. B but was wounded and discharged after First Bull Run. He later returned to service and was commissioned colonel of the 44th Wisconsin Infantry Regiment. After the war he became a U.S. congressman from Colorado.
- William H. Upham was a private in Co. F and was wounded and captured at First Bull Run. He resigned in May 1862 to enroll in the United States Military Academy. After the war he was elected the 18th Governor of Wisconsin.
- Samuel K. Vaughan was 2nd lieutenant in Co. G, but resigned after just a few months and re-enlisted with the 19th Wisconsin Infantry Regiment. He rose to become lieutenant colonel of the 19th Wisconsin Infantry and received an honorary brevet to brigadier general.
- Gilbert M. Woodward was enlisted and later 1st lieutenant in Co. B. In 1863, he was appointed adjutant of the regiment and served on the brigade staff of General Solomon Meredith. He was wounded at Gettysburg. After the war he became a U.S. congressman.

== See also ==
- Iron Brigade
- List of Wisconsin Civil War units
- Wisconsin in the American Civil War
- 2nd Wisconsin Infantry Regiment (1898)
