= Samuel K. Vaughan =

Union Army officer in the American Civil War

Sheriff of Columbia County, Wisconsin
- In office January 7, 1867 – January 4, 1869
- Preceded by: P. P. Pool
- Succeeded by: Oliver H. Sorrenson

Wisconsin Circuit Court Clerk for Columbia County
- In office January 1, 1855 – January 3, 1859
- Preceded by: Arthur W. Delaney
- Succeeded by: A. Morehouse

Personal details
- Born: April 20, 1824 Adams, Massachusetts, U.S.
- Died: September 28, 1872 (aged 48) Portage, Wisconsin, U.S.
- Resting place: Silver Lake Cemetery, Portage, Wisconsin

Military service
- Allegiance: United States
- Branch/service: United States Volunteers; Union Army
- Years of service: 1861–1865
- Rank: Lt. Colonel, USV; Brevet Brig. General, USV
- Unit: 2nd Reg. Wis. Vol. Infantry; 19th Reg. Wis. Vol. Infantry
- Battles/wars: American Civil War

Samuel King Vaughan (April 20, 1824 – September 28, 1872) was an American businessman and Wisconsin pioneer. He served as a Union Army officer throughout the American Civil War and was granted an honorary brevet to brigadier general. After the war, he served a term as sheriff of Columbia County, Wisconsin.

== Career ==
Vaughan joined the Union Army as a second lieutenant in the 2nd Wisconsin Volunteer Infantry Regiment on June 11, 1861. He resigned his commission on September 16, 1861. He rejoined the army on March 31, 1862, as a captain in the 19th Wisconsin Volunteer Infantry Regiment. He was promoted to major on January 22, 1864. He later took part in the Siege of Petersburg. When Richmond, Virginia was occupied by the Union Army on April 3, 1865, the 19th Wisconsin Infantry was the first regiment to reach the city and Vaughan received the distinction of raising the regiment's flag at the city hall. He assumed command of the regiment later that month. He was promoted to lieutenant colonel on May 3, 1865. Vaughn was mustered out of the volunteers on August 9, 1865. He received an appointment as brevet colonel to rank from August 9, 1865, preliminary to his appointment as a brevet brigadier general of volunteers. On February 21, 1866, President Andrew Johnson nominated Vaughn for appointment to the grade of brevet brigadier general of volunteers to rank from August 9, 1865, and the United States Senate confirmed the appointment on April 10, 1866.

Vaughan died at his home in Portage, Wisconsin, on September 28, 1872, after a months-long illness.

Military offices
Preceded by Col. Horace T. Sanders	Command of the 19th Wisconsin Infantry Regiment; April 1865 – August 9, 1865	Regiment disbanded
Legal offices
Preceded by Arthur W. Delaney	Wisconsin Circuit Court Clerk for Columbia County; January 1, 1855 – January 3, 1859	Succeeded by A. Morehouse
Preceded by P. P. Pool	Sheriff of Columbia County, Wisconsin; January 7, 1867 – January 4, 1869	Succeeded by Oliver H. Sorrenson
