= David McKee (American politician) =

19th century American politician

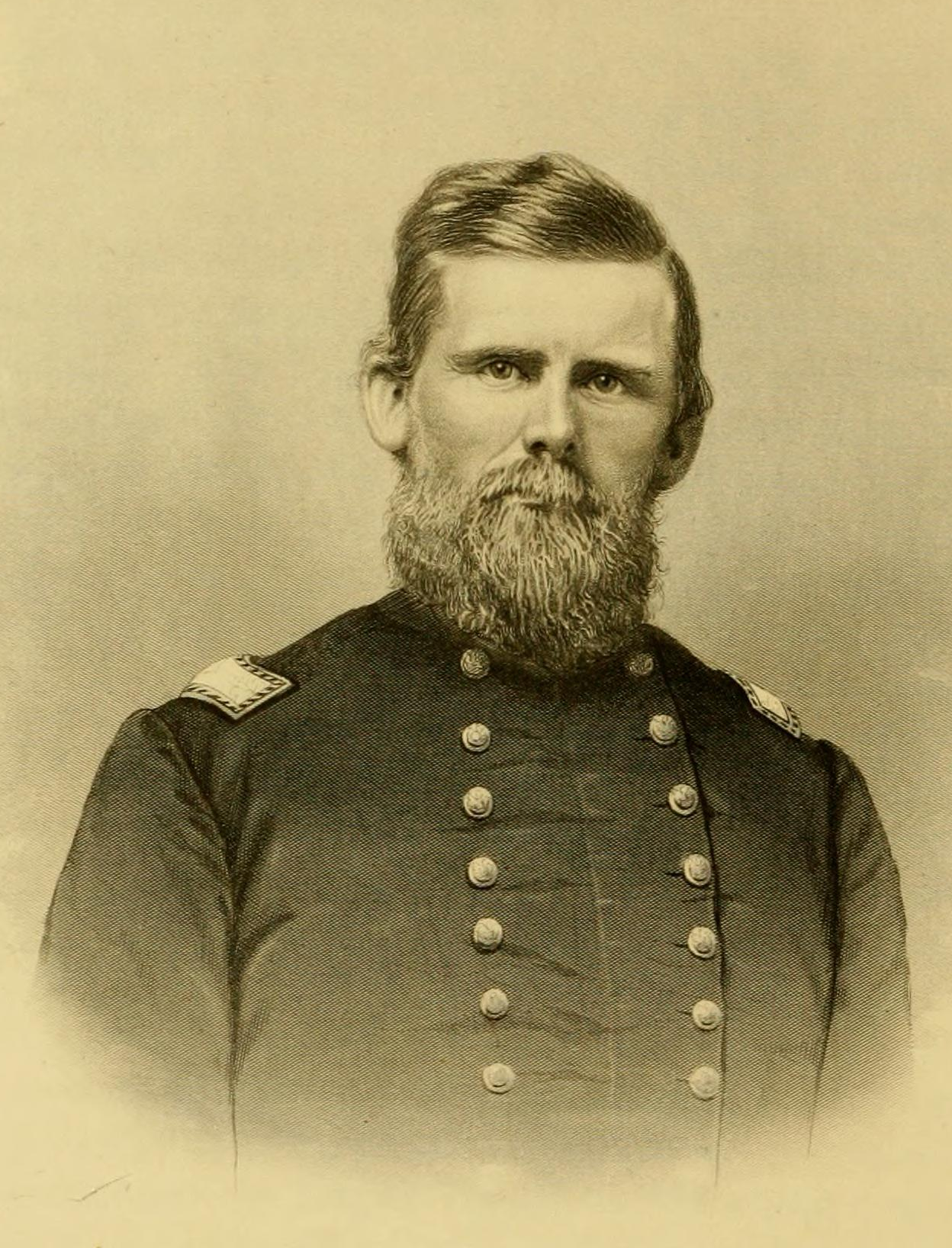
- Depicted in Quiner's Military History of Wisconsin (1866)

Member of the Wisconsin State Assembly from the Grant 3rd district
- In office January 5, 1852 – January 3, 1853
- Preceded by: William R. Biddlecome
- Succeeded by: Titus Hayes

Personal details
- Born: November 20, 1828 St. Louis, Missouri, U.S.
- Died: December 31, 1862 (aged 34) Battle of Stones River, Rutherford County, Tennessee, U.S.
- Cause of death: Killed in action
- Resting place: Hillside Cemetery, Lancaster, Wisconsin
- Party: Republican; Democratic (before 1855)
- Spouse: Pamela McKee
- Children: none
- Profession: lawyer

Military service
- Allegiance: United States
- Branch/service: United States Volunteers; Union Army
- Years of service: 1861–1862
- Rank: Lieutenant Colonel, USV
- Unit: 2nd Reg. Wis. Vol. Infantry; 15th Reg. Wis. Vol. Infantry
- Battles/wars: American Civil War: Manassas campaign (Cpt., Co. C, 2nd Wis.); First Battle of Bull Run (took command, 2nd Wis.); Battle of Perryville (Ltc., 15th Wis.); Battle of Stones River (K.I.A.)

David McKee (November 20, 1828 – December 31, 1862) was an American lawyer, politician, and Wisconsin pioneer. He served one term in the Wisconsin State Assembly, representing Grant County. He was killed at the Battle of Stones River in the American Civil War.

== Early life ==
David McKee was born at St. Louis, Missouri, to a family of Irish American immigrants. When he was three years old, his family moved to what is now Grant County, Wisconsin—at the time, this was part of "Iowa County" in the Michigan Territory—where his father worked as a lead miner. McKee remained with his father in Grant County until he was old enough to be sent back to St. Louis to finish his education.

He became involved with the Democratic Party and, in 1851, he won election to the Wisconsin State Assembly in Grant County's 3rd Assembly district. He reluctantly left the Democratic Party in the 1850s and joined the new Republican Party to be on the side of abolition.

He studied law and was admitted to the bar in 1858. He moved to Lancaster, Wisconsin, and engaged in a legal partnership with Joseph Trotter Mills.

== Civil War service ==
=== Northern Virginia (1861) ===
At the outbreak of the American Civil War, McKee immediately worked to recruit a company of volunteers from the Lancaster area and was elected captain. His company was enrolled as Company C in the 2nd Wisconsin Infantry Regiment.

The 2nd Wisconsin Infantry was assigned to the brigade of Colonel William Tecumseh Sherman in the Army of Northeastern Virginia. They joined the march into Virginia in the Summer of 1861, and on July 21, they participated in the First Battle of Bull Run. In the morning phase of the battle, they were part of Sherman's successful flanking attack which destabilized the Confederate left.

The Confederates, however, re-established their defenses further south, with reinforcements. In the disorganized afternoon assault against the Confederate defenses, the 2nd Wisconsin received friendly fire while assaulting an enemy cannon, and attempted to withdraw, becoming lost and intermingled in other disorganized regiments. Masses of Union soldiers fled the field. The 2nd Wisconsin attempted to cross the stone bridge, back to the east side of the Bull Run, but had to wade through the water as the bridge was blocked by broken artillery. The regiment was able to collect themselves near Centreville, Virginia. Since none of the field officers were present, the regiment elected Captain McKee to lead the march back toward Washington, D.C. McKee wrote an account of the casualties of his company after the battle.

The regiment spent the remainder of the year in camp near Washington, building fortifications and drilling. They received visits from President Abraham Lincoln, Secretary of State William H. Seward, and Wisconsin Governor Alexander Randall.

=== Island Number Ten (Spring 1862) ===
On March 26, 1862, McKee was commissioned lieutenant colonel for the new 15th Wisconsin Infantry Regiment (The "Scandinavian Regiment"). McKee met the regiment at Island Number Ten on the Mississippi River, near New Madrid, Missouri, after the battle there. The 15th Wisconsin Infantry had been left to garrison the island, due to the large stores of ammunition at the site.

=== Kentucky campaign (Fall 1862) ===
In June, the 15th Wisconsin departed Island Number 10, marching to Union City, Tennessee, and joining the division of General Robert Byington Mitchell. The division marched through western Tennessee, arriving at Florence, Alabama, on August 24. At that point, however, all Union forces in the area were recalled to Louisville, Kentucky, to head off the attack of General Braxton Bragg, who had launched an offensive through central Tennessee into Kentucky. They arrived tired and hungry on September 26. After a few days, the Union Army marched out to confront Bragg and met him near Perryville, Kentucky.

The Battle of Perryville occurred on October 8, 1862, but the 15th Wisconsin Infantry and its division was located at a position south of the main battlefield. They remained in support of a cannon battery through the morning, until a small Confederate detachment approached their position. The Union force easily repelled the Confederate attack, with the 15th Wisconsin Infantry joining in the skirmish. After briefly pursuing Bragg, the Union army turned to consolidating their position.

=== Middle Tennessee (Winter 1862) ===
In early November, Lt. Colonel McKee was put in command of an expedition to reconnoiter forage and terrain, and hunt Confederate guerillas. He captured 47 prisoners, destroyed about 100 small arms, and burned two homes and a distillery which he believed were providing refuge to guerilla parties. Colonel William Carlin complimented McKee on the expedition, saying, "This handsome little success, which shows what good infantry can do under an enterprising leader, reflects much credit on all who were engaged in it."

Following the expedition, the 15th Wisconsin Infantry returned to Nashville, Tennessee. The Army had been reorganized in the meantime, and the 15th Wisconsin Infantry was now organized in the division of Brigadier General Jefferson C. Davis, in the right wing of the Army of the Cumberland, under Major General Alexander McDowell McCook. The army set out against Bragg on December 26, meeting him near Murfreesboro, Tennessee. That day, a Confederate cannon battery was identified on a formidable terrain feature known as Knob Gap, and Lieutenant Colonel McKee was ordered to lead a band of skirmishers to take the battery at all costs. McKee took one company from each regiment of the brigade and led them directly at the enemy cannons, through brush and over hills, until they were close enough to open fire. The brigade followed after them, sending the Confederates scattering, and taking possession of the guns.

They camped at the gap, then continued their advance. On the morning of December 30, the two armies met in the opening phase of the Battle of Stones River. The 15th Wisconsin Infantry and their division were placed in the middle of the right wing of the Union line. McKee again commanded the skirmish line, encountering the enemy and clearing the advance for the brigade. The Union advance halted in the afternoon, then slept in position on the battlefield.

On the morning of December 31, a Confederate attack on the Union right sent that division into retreat. Colonel Heg, commanding the 15th Wisconsin Infantry, sought to stabilize the line and ordered his regiment to turn right to avoid being flanked. They engaged in an intense firefight in this position, where McKee was shot in the forehead and killed. The regiment subsequently retreated, finding themselves nearly surrounded with enemy on three sides.

McKee's body was recovered and sent to Lancaster for burial. His death was noted in the reports of Major General McCook, Brigadier General Davis, and Colonel Carlin.

== Personal life and family ==
McKee's parents were Irish American immigrants. After his death, his wife married Major Myron W. Wood, who had also been widowed. On her death in 1910, her body was cremated and the ashes were placed in McKee's grave.

Wisconsin State Assembly
Preceded by William R. Biddlecome	Member of the Wisconsin State Assembly from the Grant 3rd district January 5, 1852 – January 3, 1853	Succeeded by Titus Hayes
