= Albert T. Morgan =

American Reconstruction-era politician (1842–1922)

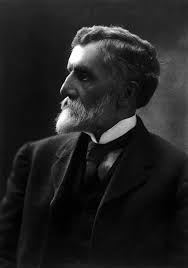

Sheriff of Yazoo County, Mississippi
- In office April 3, 1874 – September 1875
- Preceded by: George M. Powell
- Succeeded by: Hilary L. Taylor
- In office January 6, 1874 – January 8, 1874
- Preceded by: Francis P. Hilliard
- Succeeded by: George M. Powell

Member of the Mississippi Senate from the 13th district
- In office January 3, 1870 – October 27, 1873
- Preceded by: Position established
- Succeeded by: J. E. Everett

Personal details
- Born: June 9, 1842 Theresa, New York, U.S.
- Died: April 15, 1922 (aged 79) Denver, Colorado, U.S.
- Resting place: Crown Hill Cemetery and Arboretum, Section 57, Lot 909, Indianapolis, Indiana, U.S.
- Party: Republican
- Spouse: Carolyn Victoria Highgate (m. 1870–1922)
- Children: Albert Talmon Morgan^{(b. 1871; died 1954)}; Carolyn (Shannon)^{(b. 1872; died 1958)}; Angela Morgan^{(b. 1874; died 1957)}; Helen A. Morgan^{(b. 1876; died 1898)}; Lucia Eleanor (Hogg)^{(b. 1878; died 1927)}; George Percival Morgan^{(b. 1882; died 1894)}
- Occupation: Civil War soldier and Reconstruction-era Radical Republican senator
- Known for: Author of Yazoo: On the Picket Line of Freedom in the South: A Personal Narrative

Military service
- Allegiance: United States
- Branch/service: United States Volunteers; Union Army
- Years of service: 1861–1865
- Rank: Captain, USV; Brevet Lt. Colonel, USV
- Unit: 2nd Reg. Wis. Vol. Infantry; 6th Reg. Wis. Vol. Infantry
- Battles/wars: American Civil War

Albert Talmon Morgan (June 9, 1842 – April 15, 1922) was an American farmer and politician. During the Civil War he served as a Union Army officer in the famed Iron Brigade of the Army of the Potomac. A Republican, he was elected to office in Mississippi during Reconstruction and was a delegate to the convention which produced Mississippi's new constitution after the American Civil War. He was forced to flee the state in 1875 due to White terrorism against Reconstruction. He wrote a memoir of his life in the Reconstruction-era South, called Yazoo: On the Picket Line of Freedom in the South.

== Early life ==
Albert Morgan was born in Theresa, Jefferson County, New York, in 1842. As a child, he moved with his parents to a farm near Fox Lake, Wisconsin, where he was educated and raised. He had been set to attend Oberlin College in Ohio, but at the outbreak of the American Civil War, he abandoned his college plans to volunteer in the Union Army.

== Civil War service ==
Morgan enlisted as a private with Company A of the 2nd Wisconsin Infantry Regiment and went with them to the front in Washington, D.C. The 2nd Wisconsin Infantry was organized with the 6th Wisconsin, 7th Wisconsin, and 19th Indiana regiments into a brigade which soon became famous as the Iron Brigade of the Army of the Potomac.

The 2nd Wisconsin Infantry saw intense fighting through the first two years of the war and suffered heavy casualties. Morgan was wounded and taken prisoner at the Battle of Gainesville, but was subsequently paroled. He was wounded again at the Battle of Gettysburg. He was promoted to corporal, sergeant, and first sergeant in the company, and re-enlisted as a veteran after his term expired in January 1864. He finally receiving a commission as 2nd lieutenant in March 1864. By June 1864, however, the 2nd Wisconsin Infantry had been so badly decimated by the war, that it could no longer be sustained as a regiment and was instead reconstituted as an independent battalion of two companies. Morgan was designated 1st lieutenant in the independent battalion.

The independent battalion was assigned to provost duty for the division, but participated in further fighting at the Siege of Petersburg. Morgan was wounded again at the Battle of Globe Tavern, but again returned to duty. He was promoted to captain of Company B of the independent battalion in September. The two companies of the independent battalion were absorbed into the 6th Wisconsin Infantry Regiment in November 1864, Morgan's company became Company H of the 6th Wisconsin Infantry.

After the Union took possession of Petersburg and Richmond, the Iron Brigade was instrumental in the Appomattox campaign, the surrender of the Army of Northern Virginia, and the capture of Confederate president Jefferson Davis. They participated in the Grand Review of the Armies in May 1865, before mustering out of service in July.

== Mississippi Reconstruction ==
After mustering out of the Union Army, Morgan moved to Mississippi with his brother, Charles, in November 1865. They rented a large farm, but ran into problems with the landlord, resulting in months of legal disputes.

Morgan was an avid Republican and became active in Reconstruction politics. He started a Republican newspaper in Yazoo County, and established the first Republican Party organization in the county. In 1868 and 1869, he helped organize, and was then a delegate to the convention to draft a new constitution for Mississippi.

He was elected to the Mississippi Senate in 1869, taking office in 1870. He subsequently was elected chancery clerk of Yazoo County. As a result of his holding the county office, his eligibility to simultaneously serve as senator was called into question. In the Fall of 1873, the Mississippi Legislature passed a law disqualifying Morgan from his Senate seat, along with several other legislators who were also serving as county officers.

=== Death of F. P. Hilliard ===
That same Fall, Morgan pursued election as sheriff of Yazoo County. His opponent was Francis P. Hilliard, who had been appointed to the position by the Union military governor—with Morgan's recommendation. In the 1873 election, Morgan won an overwhelming majority. Hilliard did not contest the election, but on the beginning of Morgan's term, Hilliard refused to relinquish access to the sheriff's office at the court house. On January 8, 1874, Morgan, with a band of allies, took possession of the office when Hilliard and his allies were absent.

On hearing this, Hilliard formed a posse of roughly 30 people and marched back to the court house. Morgan went out to speak to him in the street, leaving his brother and a few men in the office. Hilliard ignored him, and took his crowd into the court house. Hilliard broke down the door and was quickly shot by one of the men inside. Both sides then exchanged fire. According to Morgan's testimony, he feared his brother and friends were in mortal danger. Hilliard was shot in the head at this point, but sources differ on who was responsible. Witnesses agree that Hilliard was walking toward Morgan at the time of the fatal shot. A medical examination suggested that Hilliard was shot in the back of the head.

Morgan immediately surrendered himself to the mayor, and was detained in prison. After several months, however, Morgan was able to secure bail, and subsequently the grand jury failed to produce an indictment against him. He was thus able to resume the office of sheriff in April 1874.

=== Political violence ===
In 1874 and 1875, white reactionary violence against reconstruction was reaching a climax in Mississippi. Morgan, as sheriff, received reports of several bands of white men organizing and arming themselves. Morgan reached out to them and heard, in response, that these companies were organizing to defend themselves against rumored black mobs and insurrection. Morgan insisted that if such mobs existed, they were a matter for the sheriff; he offered to accompany them to locate and defuse any such insurrection. Morgan's offers were refused. His own investigations found no black insurrections being planned. Nevertheless, rumors of insurrection persisted through 1875.

The situation reached a climax for Morgan at a September meeting of the county Republican Party. While Morgan was speaking, armed white gangs entered the hall and began disrupting the speech. A shouting match ensued between supporters of either faction, and then gunfire erupted.

Morgan fled the meeting and went into hiding. Armed bands roamed the streets. Under threat of lynching, Morgan left the county. Subsequently, a number of black men and Republicans living in the county were lynched; Republican election tickets and lists were seized and destroyed. The violence succeeded in preventing those populations from participating in the 1875 election and effectively ended reconstruction in Yazoo County.

Morgan left Mississippi in January 1876, and went to Washington, D.C., where he testified at United States Senate hearings on the violence in Mississippi.

== Later years ==
Morgan went on to live in Lawrence, Kansas, and worked as a lawyer. In addition to his memoir on Reconstruction, he authored a number of works of financial literature. He subsequently moved to Denver, Colorado, to prospect for gold. Upon the release of the 1915 film The Birth of a Nation, which glorified the actions of the Ku Klux Klan against reconstruction in the south, Morgan spoke out against the film with the historical events he experienced.

Morgan died at Denver on April 15, 1922.

== Personal life and family ==
Morgan was the son of George and Eleanor Morgan, baptist missionaries and avowed abolitionists. He had many siblings, but was most closely associated with his older brother Charles, who also served in the Union Army, and worked with him throughout the Reconstruction effort in Mississippi.

While living in Mississippi Albert Morgan married Carolyn Victoria "Carrie" Highgate, an "Octoroon" school teacher from Ithaca, New York. James Aaron Moore presided at their wedding. The marriage was only legally possible because of Morgan's own efforts in the Mississippi Senate to repeal laws against inter-racial marriage. Morgan's marriage to a woman with black ancestry was another inciting controversy during his time in office.

Carrie was a teacher in post-war Mississippi, and much of Morgan's political efforts in Reconstruction were geared toward developing free education in Yazoo County. They had at least six children, including Angela Morgan, who earned notoriety as a poet.

== Published works ==
- Morgan, Albert T. (1884). Yazoo: or, On the Picket Line of Freedom in the South. Washington, D.C.: A. T. Morgan.
