= When Nature Wants a Man =

1918 poem

When Nature Wants A Man is a poem by Angela Morgan published in Forward, March (1918) by John Lane Company.

== Adaptations ==
In Spiritual Leadership (1967), John Oswald Sanders published a poem beginning with the words "When God wants to drill a man" and credited it to author anonymous. Sanders' version replaces Angela Morgan's "Nature" with "God" and her feminine pronouns with masculine ones.

Excerpt from Sanders' 1967 Version

When God wants to drill a man
And thrill a man
And skill a man,
When God wants to mold a man
To play the noblest part;
When He yearns with all His heart
To create so great and bold a man
That all the world shall be amazed,
Watch His methods, watch His ways!
How He ruthlessly perfects
Whom He royally elects!

Excerpt from Morgan's 1918 Version

When Nature wants to drill a man
And thrill a man,
And skill a man,
When Nature wants to mould a man
To play the noblest part;
When she yearns with all her heart
To create so great and bold a man
That all the world shall praise
Watch her methods, watch her ways!
How she ruthlessly perfects
Whom she royally elects
