= Rollin M. Strong =

19th-century American politician

R. M. Strong

Treasurer of Sauk County, Wisconsin
- In office January 7, 1867 – January 4, 1875
- Preceded by: T. D. Lang
- Succeeded by: Alfred L. Slye

Member of the Wisconsin State Assembly from the Sauk 2nd district
- In office January 1, 1866 – January 7, 1867
- Preceded by: Argalus Starks
- Succeeded by: Stephen Steele Barlow

Sheriff of Sauk County, Wisconsin
- In office January 1, 1861
- Preceded by: Ebenezer Martin
- Succeeded by: N. Stewart

Personal details
- Born: July 27, 1830 Bridport, Vermont, U.S.
- Died: October 11, 1897 (aged 67) Warner House, Sparta, Wisconsin, U.S.
- Resting place: Green Wood Cemetery, Reedsburg, Wisconsin
- Party: Republican
- Spouse: Sara Elvira Rudd (m. 1856–1897)
- Children: E. O. Strong; (b. 1857; died 1865)

Military service
- Allegiance: United States
- Branch/service: United States Volunteers; Union Army
- Years of service: 1861–1865
- Rank: Lt. Colonel, USV
- Unit: 19th Reg. Wis. Vol. Infantry
- Battles/wars: American Civil War: Battle of New Bern; Siege of Petersburg; Battle of Fair Oaks & Darbytown Road

Rollin M. Strong (July 27, 1830 – October 11, 1897) was an American businessman, Republican politician, and Wisconsin pioneer. He served in the Wisconsin State Assembly, representing Sauk County, and was chief clerk of the Assembly for several years in the 1870s. During the American Civil War, he served as a Union Army officer. In historical documents, his name is usually abbreviated as R. M. Strong.

== Early life ==
R. M. Strong was born at Bridport, Vermont, in July 1830. He was educated at the Troy Conference Academy in Poultney, Vermont, and moved to Wisconsin in June 1850.

He was elected sheriff of Sauk County in the November 1860 election, but resigned on the day he took office, choosing instead to volunteer for service in the Union Army, due to the outbreak of the American Civil War.

== Civil War service ==
He raised a company of volunteers from Sauk County and was elected their captain. His company was soon enrolled as Company A of the 19th Wisconsin Infantry Regiment and was organized at Camp Randall. The regiment was employed to guard prisoners of war there until they mustered into federal service April 30, 1862. The regiment then proceeded to Washington, D.C., for service in the western theater of the war. They were first assigned to guard duty at Union-held cities and fortresses on the Virginia Peninsula, and were then redeployed to defend Union-held territory on the coast of North Carolina. Captain Strong was promoted to major on September 30, 1863, and then to lieutenant colonel on December 3, 1863.

He was in command of the Union defenders stationed at Newbern, North Carolina, and successfully repelled a Confederate attack in the Winter of 1864. In April 1864, the regiment was shipped back to Virginia and organized into XVIII Corps in the Army of the James. The colonel of the 19th Wisconsin Infantry, Horace T. Sanders, was placed in command of their brigade, leaving Lt. Colonel Strong in command of the regiment. Their corps was engaged in the Bermuda Hundred campaign, which landed 33,000 Union soldiers along the Virginia coast to coincide with Grant's Overland Campaign.

After some skirmishes in eastern Virginia, they moved toward Petersburg, and joined Grant's Siege of Petersburg. The 19th Wisconsin Infantry was re-enlisted in August 1864 as a veteran regiment and received a two-month furlough. They returned to the Petersburg trenches in October. That month, the regiment was sent out on a mission to cut the Confederate supply lines. Strong led the charge against a Confederate fort at the Battle of Fair Oaks & Darbytown Road, where the regiment suffered its most severe casualties of the war. Strong was wounded and captured, along with about 600 other Union men. He spent most of the remainder of the war confined to Libby Prison, where his left leg was amputated. He was paroled February 19, 1865, and resigned from federal service April 11, 1865.

== Postbellum career ==
Upon returning from the war, he was immediately nominated as the National Union Party candidate for Wisconsin State Assembly in Sauk County's 2nd Assembly district (the southern half of the county). He was elected and served in the 1866 session. In the Fall of 1866, he was elected treasurer of Sauk County, and was subsequently re-elected in 1868, 1870, and 1872.

In 1875, the Republican majority in the Assembly elected him as chief clerk for the 28th Legislature; he was subsequently re-elected for the 29th Legislature.

He was one of the founding directors of the Baraboo Valley Air-Line Railway, and worked on that line until it was acquired by the Chicago & Northwestern Railroad.

Sometime after 1880, he moved to Omaha, Nebraska, where he remained for the rest of his life. He journeyed back to Wisconsin in August 1897 and died at a hotel in Sparta, Wisconsin, during the trip. He had been in poor health for a number of years.

Wisconsin State Assembly
Preceded by Argalus Starks	Member of the Wisconsin State Assembly from the Sauk 2nd district January 1, 1866 – January 7, 1867	Succeeded by Stephen Steele Barlow
Political offices
Preceded by T. D. Lang	Treasurer of Sauk County, Wisconsin; January 7, 1867 – January 4, 1875	Succeeded by Alfred L. Slye
Legal offices
Preceded by Ebenezer Martin	Sheriff of Sauk County, Wisconsin; January 1, 1861	Succeeded by N. Stewart
