= Fort St. Clair =

Fort in Preble County, Ohio, US

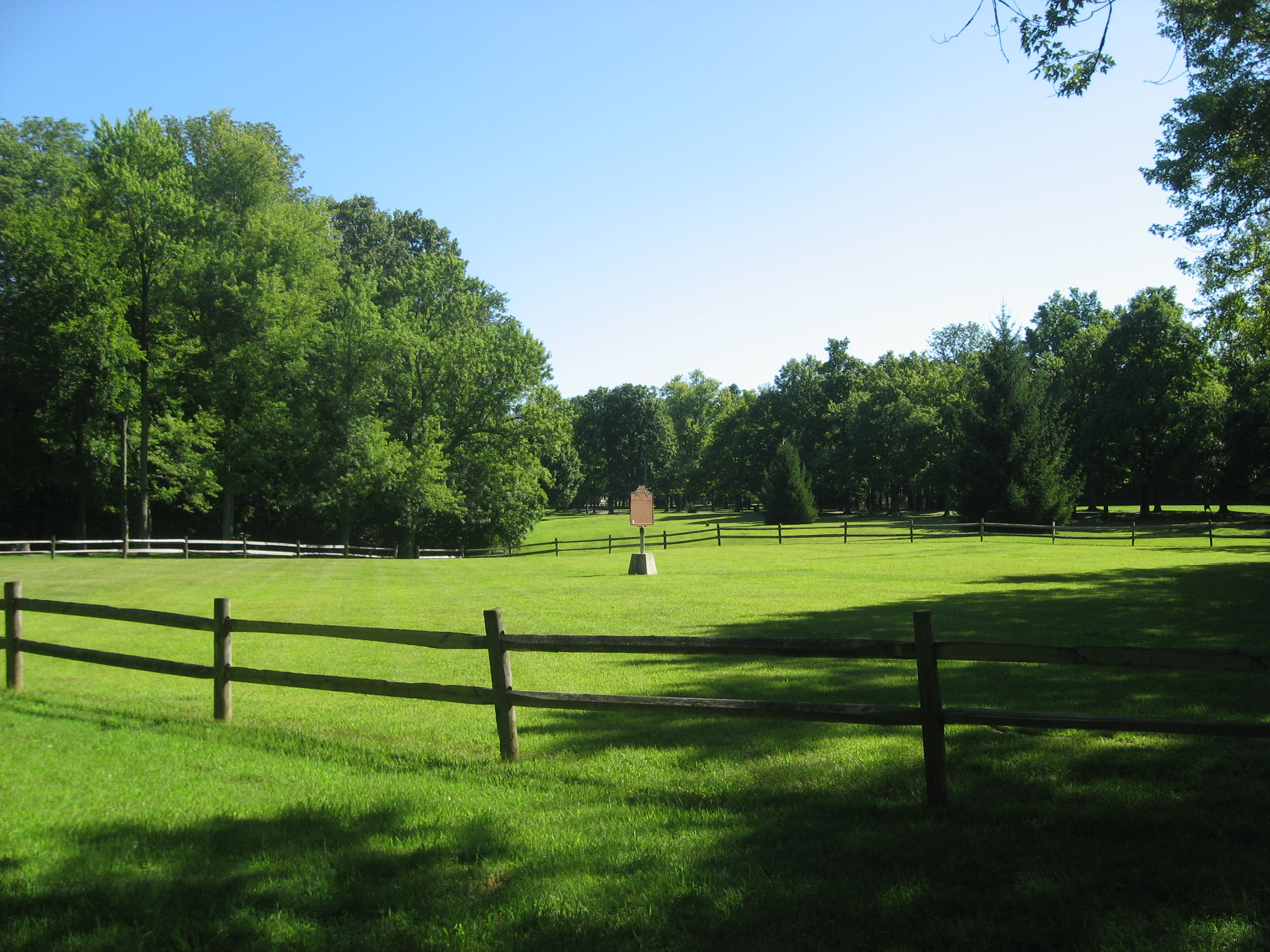

Site information
- Type: Fort

Location
- Coordinates: 39.7381°N 84.6543107°W

Site history
- Built: 1791–1792
- Battles/wars: Northwest Indian War

Fort St. Clair was a fort built in March 1792 during the Northwest Indian War near the modern city of Eaton, Preble County, Ohio. The site of the fort was listed on the National Register of Historic Places in 1970.

== History ==
Northwest Territory Governor Arthur St. Clair ordered a chain of forts to be built North from Cincinnati in order to project United States power into Native American territory. Following St. Clair's Defeat in November 1791, the United States Army retreated to Fort Jefferson, Fort Hamilton, and finally Fort Washington (Cincinnati, Ohio). Major General St. Clair departed for Philadelphia in January 1792, and Lieutenant Colonel James Wilkinson assumed command of the United States forces at Fort Washington. Wilkinson noted that it took two days to travel from Fort Hamilton to Fort Jefferson, which contributed to the suffering of the wounded who could not leave Fort Jefferson following St. Clair's Defeat. Wilkinson ordered the construction of Fort Saint Clair between the other two forts in order to secure communications and supply convoys between the chain of United States outposts.

In November 1792, following the decision of a Native American Grand Council at the mouth of the Auglaize River, Little Turtle led a force of 200 Miami and Shawnee past United States outposts of Fort Jefferson and Fort St. Clair, and reached Fort Hamilton on 3 November with the intention of an attack near the United States settlements on the anniversary of St. Clair's Defeat. They captured two prisoners and learned that a large convoy of packhorses had left for Fort Jefferson and was due back in a matter of days. Little Turtle moved North and found the convoy, nearly 100 horses and 100 members of the Kentucky Militia (the predecessor to the Kentucky National Guard), led by Major John Adair, camped just outside Fort St. Clair. On November 6, Little Turtle attacked at dawn, just as Major Adair recalled his sentries. The Militia conducted an organized retreat to the fort, with six killed (considered the first Kentucky Guardsman killed in action), four missing, and five wounded. Major Adair later criticized Fort St. Clair's commandant, Captain Bradley, for his failure to come to their aid. Little Turtle's force lost two warriors, but captured the camp and all provisions. All horses were killed, wounded, or driven off; only 23 were later recovered. Wilkinson considered the horses to be a loss that would make the advanced forts un-defendable.

In 1922, the State of Ohio and the Preble County Historical Society established Fort St. Clair State Memorial on 77 acres, including the original site of the fort. Twelve more acres of nature preserve were added in 1933. The state memorial was turned over to the City of Eaton in 1992, establishing its current status as Fort St. Clair Park, a community park with trails, picnic shelters and cabins, a playground, and historical memorials to various wars (in addition to the main memorials related to the Battle of Fort St. Clair). Since 1987, during each December the fort has hosted "Whispering Christmas," a drive-through Christmas lights display featuring over 2 million lights.

== Sources ==
- Gaff, Alan D. (2004). Bayonets in the Wilderness. Anthony Waynes Legion in the Old Northwest. Norman: University of Oklahoma Press. ISBN 0-8061-3585-9.
- Roberts, Robert B., Encyclopedia of Historic Forts: The Military, Pioneer, and Trading Posts of the United States, Macmillan, New York, 1988, 10th printing, ISBN 0-02-926880-X, page 646
- Sword, Wiley (1985). President Washington's Indian War. The Struggle for the Old Northwest, 1790-1795. Norman, Oklahoma: University of Oklahoma Press. ISBN 0806124881.
- "Fort St Clair". Ohio Exploration Society.
- "Fort Saint Clair". fortwiki.com.
