= William Ockler =

19th century American politician

Member of the Wisconsin State Assembly from the Waukesha 3rd district
- In office January 2, 1871 – January 1, 1872
- Preceded by: Thomas McCarty
- Succeeded by: District abolished

Personal details
- Born: March 26, 1843 Gössitz, Province of Saxony, Kingdom of Prussia
- Died: September 10, 1918 (aged 75) Menomonie, Wisconsin, U.S.
- Resting place: Lower Weston Cemetery, Weston, Dunn County, Wisconsin
- Party: Democratic
- Spouse: Helena Haefner (m. 1871; died 1895)
- Children: Charles W. Ockler^{(b. 1872; died 1961)}; Andrew H. Ockler^{(b. 1879; died 1957)}; Marguerite (Wood)^{(b. 1881; died 1961)}; Jacob Ockler^{(b. 1883; died 1962)}; Hattie O. (Retzloff)^{(b. 1884; died 1972)}; Theresa Ockler^{(b. 1886; died 1957)}; Hattie Ockler^{(b. 1887)}; Samuel Ockler^{(b. 1891; died 1961)}

Military service
- Allegiance: United States
- Branch/service: United States Volunteers; Union Army
- Years of service: 1864–1865
- Rank: Private, USV
- Unit: 19th Reg. Wis. Vol. Infantry
- Battles/wars: American Civil War

William Ockler (March 26, 1843 – September 10, 1918) was a German American immigrant, farmer, and Democratic politician. He was a member of the Wisconsin State Assembly, representing eastern Waukesha County during the 1871 session.

== Biography ==
William Ockler was born March 26, 1843, in what was then the Province of Saxony, in the Kingdom of Prussia (now central Germany). He emigrated to the United States with his parents in 1857, sailing from Hamburg to Quebec, and then to Detroit, and finally Milwaukee. His father purchased a farm in Muskego, Wisconsin, in neighboring Waukesha County, where the family settled.

In 1864, he volunteered for service in the Union Army amidst the American Civil War. He was enrolled as a private in Company E of the 19th Wisconsin Infantry Regiment. Ockler joined the regiment in New Bern, North Carolina, where they had been stationed for nearly a year as part of the Union blockade of Confederate ports. This was a particularly active period in this coastal battle, as the Union soon abandoned their control over Havelock, and Plymouth. In late April, they boarded boats and returned to Yorktown, Virginia, where they joined the Army of the James. Ockler's company was used as skirmishers in the Second Battle of Fort Darling, and he was wounded during that operation. The regiment then went on to join the Siege of Petersburg. Shortly after their arrival however, their veterans were all given furlough for re-enlisting, and the remnant of the regiment—including Ockler—participated in the Second Battle of Fair Oaks. The regiment spent most of the rest of the war engaged in picket duty on the line around Richmond, Virginia.

After the war, Ockler served several years as town treasurer and justice of the peace in Muskego. He was elected to the Wisconsin State Assembly in 1870, running on the Democratic Party ticket. He represented Waukesha County's 3rd Assembly district, which then comprised roughly the eastern quarter of the county. His district was abolished in the 1871 redistricting act. He subsequently served two terms on the Waukesha County board of supervisors, then moved to the town of Weston in Dunn County, Wisconsin, where he cultivated a farm for the next 25 years.

About the year 1900, Ockler retired to a house in the neighboring city of Menomonie, Wisconsin. He died at his home in Menomonie on September 10, 1918, after several months of illness.

== Personal life and family ==
William Ockler was one of seven children of Tobias Ockler and his wife Erdmund (née Weber).

William Ockler married Helena Haefner in 1871. They had at least 8 children together, seven of which survived them.

== Electoral history ==
=== Wisconsin Assembly (1870) ===
Wisconsin Assembly, Waukesha 3rd District Election, 1870
Party	Candidate	Votes	%	±%
General Election, November 8, 1870
Democratic	William Ockler	1,057	67.89%	+3.86%
Republican	John Fuss	500	32.11%	
Plurality		557	35.77%	+7.73%
Total votes		1,557	100.0%	+2.03%
Democratic hold				

Wisconsin State Assembly
Preceded by Thomas McCarty	Member of the Wisconsin State Assembly from the Waukesha 3rd district January 2, 1871 – January 1, 1872	District abolished
