= Ephraim Blakeslee =

American politician

Ephraim Blakeslee (May 12, 1838 – February 22, 1911) was a member of the Wisconsin State Assembly in the 1880s.

== Biography ==
Blakeslee was born on May 12, 1838, in Fenner, New York. While he was a young child, his family moved to Wisconsin, where they settled near Ironton in Sauk County. At the age of 23, he married Mary Ballard and six months later, in September 1861, volunteered to serve in the Union Army during the American Civil War.

He joined Company B, 12th Wisconsin Infantry Regiment as a 1st Sergeant and served in that capacity until accepting a commission as 2nd Lieutenant of Company H in May 1862. He was promoted to 1st Lieutenant of the company in January 1864 and in August, he was detached to command Company E. A member of that company, Hosea Rood, later wrote about Blakeslee, "We liked him very much – I think all our men who marched to the sea would vote with both hands that Eph. Blakeslee was not only a most excellent company commander, but a royal good fellow, besides." Blakeslee took part in the Atlanta campaign, the March to the Sea, and the Carolina campaign with the 12th Wisconsin. In April 1865, he received a promotion to Captain of Company H, and was mustered out with his men in July.

Returning to Sauk County, Blakeslee sold the family farm and moved into Ironton, where he engaged in the mercantile trade. He and his wife, Mary, had three children before she died in 1871. He married Caroline Swift two years later. Blakeslee died on February 22, 1911, and is buried at Resting Green Cemetery in Ironton.

== Assembly career ==
Blakeslee was a member of the Wisconsin State Assembly during the 1880 and 1881 session. He was a Republican.
