= Casper Schmidt =

American politician

Casper Schmidt (December 10, 1842 – May 23, 1889) was an American miller and politician.

Born in what is now Germany, Schmidt emigrated to the United States in 1856 and settled in the town of Nekimi, Winnebago County, Wisconsin. He served in the 19th Wisconsin Volunteer Infantry Regiment during the American Civil War. Schmidt was a miller. In 1875, he moved to Oshkosh, Wisconsin. Schmidt served on the Winnebago County Board of Supervisors and was a Republican. In 1889, Schmidt served in the Wisconsin State Assembly until his death. Schmidt died of acute dysentery in Oshkosh, Wisconsin.
