= Daniel Robbins Sylvester =

American politician

Daniel Robbins Sylvester (December 22, 1825 – May 27, 1909) was a member of the Wisconsin State Assembly.

== Biography ==
Sylvester was born on December 22, 1825, in Avon, Maine. He settled in Castle Rock, Wisconsin in 1852. Earlier that year, Sylvester married Clara Winship. They had nine children. During the American Civil War, Sylvester was a captain with the 12th Wisconsin Volunteer Infantry Regiment of the Union Army. Conflicts he took part in include the Siege of Vicksburg and the Atlanta campaign. He died in 1909.

== Political career ==
Sylvester was a member of the Assembly during the 1877 session. Additionally, he was Chairman of the Town Board (similar to city council), and Assessor of Castle Rock. He was a Republican.
