= Joseph Hulbert Nichols =

American lawyer (1805–1862)

Joseph Hulbert Nichols (August 20, 1805 - December 11, 1862) was an American minister and writer.

He was born, August 20, 1805, at Newtown, Connecticut, where he resided until 1815, when his parents removed to New York City.

He fitted for college in the Episcopal Academy at Cheshire, Connecticut. He graduated from Yale College in 1825. After attending a course of medical lectures in New York, he studied law with Seth P. Staples, Esq., and also in the Litchfield Law School. He was admitted to the bar in 1828, at Albany, but soon gave up the profession of law and fitted himself for the ministry by a course of study in the General Episcopal Theological Seminary in New York. He graduated there in 1831, and was immediately ordained by Bishop Benjamin T. Onderdonk. He was then called to Richmond, Virginia to assist Bishop Richard Channing Moore in the Monumental Church; his health failing, he returned to his native town and then from 1832 to 1839 was Rector of Christ Church, Greenwich, Connecticut. He subsequently became assistant Minister of Trinity Church, New Haven, Connecticut, where he remained till 1846. After officiating as a minister in Bristol, Connecticut and Cheshire, he removed in 1851 to Racine, Wisconsin, where he was rector of St Luke's Church, until 1856, and Professor of English Literature in Racine College, till 1862.

In 1862, he became chaplain of the 19th Wisconsin Volunteer Infantry Regiment, and went with his Regiment to Norfolk, Virginia. While there, he was prostrated by a fever, which brought on delirium, terminated by his death, Dec. 11, 1862, in the Government Hospital for the Insane. He was buried in Washington. He was well known as a writer in verse and prose. His poem on the Future was delivered as an Inaugural at Racine.

He married, Sept 17, 1844, Louisa, daughter of Rev, Edward Rutledge, of New Haven.
