= 12th Wisconsin Infantry Regiment =

Union Army infantry regiment

- Flag of Wisconsin
- Active: October 18, 1861 – July 20, 1865
- Country: United States
- Allegiance: (Union (American Civil War)) Union; Wisconsin
- Branch: Infantry
- Size: Regiment
- Engagements: American Civil War: Vicksburg campaign; Siege of Vicksburg; Jackson expedition; Meridian campaign; Atlanta campaign; Battle of Kennesaw Mountain; Battle of Atlanta; Battle of Jonesborough; Savannah campaign; Carolinas campaign; Battle of Bentonville

Commanders
- Colonel: George E. Bryant
- Lt. Colonel: Dewitt C. Poole
- Colonel: James Kerr Proudfit

The 12th Wisconsin Infantry Regiment was a volunteer infantry regiment that served in the Union Army during the American Civil War. They served primarily in the western theatre of the war, participating in battles and campaigns including the Siege of Vicksburg, the Jackson expedition, the Atlanta campaign, and Sherman's March to the Sea.

== Service ==
The 12th Wisconsin was raised at Madison, Wisconsin, and mustered into Federal service October 18, 1861. It departed Madison for Fort Leavenworth, Kansas, on January 11, 1862, arriving there on February 16. Marched from Fort Leavenworth To Fort Scott, Kansas March 1–7. Duty there till March 27. Ordered to Lawrence, Kansas March 27. Ordered to Fort Riley April 20, then to Fort Leavenworth May 27. They were attached to the Department of Kansas to June, 1862. the 12th moved to various locations from March 1, 1862, to April 18, 1863.

=== The Vicksburg Campaign ===
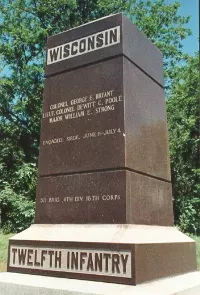
Monument at Vicksburg National Military Park

The 12th was ordered to the Siege of Vicksburg May 11, arriving there on May 22, and staying at the siege until July 4 when it was finished. At Vicksburg the 12th was part of the Third Brigade of the Fourth Division of the Sixteenth Army Corps. Immediately after, the 12th marched towards Jackson, Mississippi, and participated in the siege of the city. Ordered back to Vicksburg until August 15, when it went on an expedition to Tupelo September 1–8, capturing Fort Beauregard on September 4. It joined General Sherman's army in the Meridian Campaign, and then returned to Vicksburg until April, when the regiment left for Cairo, Illinois. After that, they moved to Clifton, Tennessee, then to Acworth, Georgia.

=== The Atlanta Campaign and follow ups ===
The regiment assaulted Kenesaw Mountain on June 27, 1864. After that, they were engaged in several battles around Chattahoochee River from July 2 through 17. They sieged Atlanta July 22 through August 25. After that, they participated in the Battle of Jonesborough (August 31 – September 1).

On November 15, "Sherman's March to the Sea" commenced, ending on December 10, at Savannah, Georgia. On January 1, Sherman's army began the Carolinas campaign. They captured Pocotaligo on January 14, were engaged at Salkehatchie Swamp February 2–5 and at Binnaker's Swamp on the 9th. They then captured Orangeburg on February 11–12, and Columbia on February 16–17. They participated in the Battle of Bentonville on March 19–21. They occupied Goldsboro on March 24, then Raleigh on April 14. On April 29, they started marching towards Washington, D.C., and reached it on May 19.

The regiment was mustered out on July 20, 1865, at Louisville, Kentucky.

== Commanders ==
- Colonel George E. Bryant (September 27, 1861 – November 6, 1864) retired at the end of his three-year enlistment. After the war, he became a Wisconsin state legislator, judge, and state superintendent of public property. During his service as colonel, he was frequently separated from the regiment in acting command of their brigade, particularly in the first half of 1863 and the latter half of 1864.
  - Lt. Colonel Dewitt C. Poole (February 5, 1863 – June 10, 1863) had command of the regiment while Colonel Bryant was in command of the brigade.
- Colonel James Kerr Proudfit (July 22, 1864 – July 16, 1865) had command of the regiment while Colonel Bryant was in command of the brigade, then succeeded him as colonel after his retirement. He began the war as second lieutenant of Co. K in the 1st Wisconsin Infantry Regiment. He joined the 12th Wisconsin Infantry as adjutant when the regiment was being organized and supported Bryant as acting assistant adjutant general when Bryant was in command of the brigade in 1863. After Lt. Colonel Poole's retirement, Proudfit was promoted directly to lieutenant colonel, vaulting over the major and the company captains. After the war, Proudfit was adjutant general of Wisconsin, served in the state Senate, and was one of the founders of the Grand Army of the Republic.

== Total enlistments and casualties ==
1667 people were enlisted in the 12th. Some sources say the 12th Wisconsin lost 3 officers and 93 enlisted men killed in action or who later died of their wounds, plus another 3 officers and 224 enlisted men who died of disease, for a total of 323 fatalities, while others say they lost 329.

12th Wisconsin Infantry, Company Organization
Company	Original Moniker	Primary Place of Recruitment	Captain(s)
A	Lyon Light Guard	Pierce County	Norman McLeod (resigned); Orrin T. Maxson (resigned); Charles Reynolds (detailed; mustered out)
B	Pioneer Rifles	Sauk County and Marquette County	Giles Stevens (mustered out); Jonathan W. Root (mustered out)
C	Dodgeville Guards	Iowa County and Dane County	Charles F. Loeber (resigned); Francis Wilson (mustered out); Daniel G. Jones (mustered out)
D	West Bend Union Guard	Washington County and Pierce County	John Martin Price (promoted); William Nungesser (mustered out)
E	Wisconsin Volunteers	Sauk County, Columbia County, La Crosse County, and Adams County	Abraham Vanderpool (resigned); John Gillespie (mustered out)
F	River Sackers	Oconto County and Marinette County	George C. Norton (mustered out); Frederick J. Bartels (mustered out)
G	Evergreens	Wood County and Marathon County	Daniel Howell (resigned); W. Wallace Botkin (transferred); Warren P. Langworthy (mustered out)
H	Green Bay Union Guards	Brown County and Oconto County	Milo C. Palmer (resigned–disability); Carlton B. Wheelock (promoted); Ephraim Blakeslee (mustered out)
I	Wisconsin Union Riflemen	Vernon County, Richland County, and the town of Forest	Hartwell L. Turner (resigned); Van S. Bennett (mustered out); Francis Hoyt (mustered out)
K	Kickapoo Rangers	Grant County and Crawford County	Daniel Robbins Sylvester (KIA); Almon N. Chandler (KIA); George R. Pyle (mustered out)

== Notable people ==
- Van S. Bennett was captain of Co. I. After the war, he served as a Wisconsin state senator.
- Harlan P. Bird was enlisted in Co. F and was then promoted to sergeant major of the regiment. In 1863, he was commissioned 2nd lieutenant of Co. G and was later promoted to 1st lieutenant. He was wounded at Vicksburg and was subsequently detailed as an adjutant for the brigade, quartermaster for XVII Corps, and ordinance officer for the division. After the war, he served as a Wisconsin state senator.
- Ephraim Blakeslee was 1st sergeant of Co. B for one year, and was then commissioned 2nd lieutenant of Co. H, rising to the rank of captain near the end of the war. After the war, he served as a Wisconsin legislator.
- Michael J. Cantwell was 1st lieutenant in Co. C and acting quartermaster. After the war, he served as a Wisconsin legislator.
- Luther H. Cary was surgeon of the regiment for the first two years and was appointed medical inspector for XVI Corps. After the war, he served in the Wisconsin and California state legislatures.
- Joseph M. Copp, son of William J. Copp, was enlisted in Co. A through nearly the entire war and rose to the rank of corporal, he was briefly a prisoner of war after Atlanta. Later in life, he became a lawyer.
- John Gillespie was captain of Co. E. He was wounded and captured at the Battle of Atlanta and remained a prisoner for the last year of the war. After the war, he served as a Wisconsin legislator.
- Michael Griffin was a sergeant in Co. E and was wounded at Atlanta. He was commissioned 2nd lieutenant shortly before the end of the war. After the war, he served as a U.S. congressman.
- Daniel Howell was captain of Co. G but resigned due to illness in 1863. Before the war he served as a Wisconsin state senator.
- James Lennon was a sergeant in Co. H and was commissioned 2nd lieutenant near the end of the war. After the war, he served as a Wisconsin legislator and sheriff.
- Orrin T. Maxson was captain of Co. A through September 1864. Before the war, he served as a Wisconsin state legislator and was a founder of Prescott, Wisconsin.
- Frank Howell Putney, a nephew of Daniel Howell, was enlisted in Co. G, rising to the rank of second lieutenant. He was later detailed as a brigade adjutant and staff officer. After the war, he became a county judge.
- Charles Reynolds was sergeant major of the regiment, then second lieutenant, first lieutenant, and finally captain of Co. A. Near the end of the war, he was detached as assistant adjutant to General Charles Ewing. After the war, he served as a Wisconsin legislator.
- William Emerson Strong was major of the regiment, but was detailed to XVII Corps staff in 1863, then transitioned to staff for the Army of the Tennessee, remaining on the regiment rolls but never returning to the regiment. While still in federal service, he transitioned to become the first inspector general of the Freedmans Bureau; he mustered out as a lieutenant colonel in 1866 and received an honorary brevet to brigadier general. Before joining the 12th Wisconsin Infantry, he was captain of Co. F in the 2nd Wisconsin Infantry Regiment.
- Daniel Robbins Sylvester was captain of Co. K through most of the war. After the war, he served as a Wisconsin legislator.
- Charles M. Webb was 1st lieutenant of Co. G for the first year of the war. After the war, he served as a Wisconsin legislator and circuit judge and was a U.S. attorney under presidents Grant and Hayes.

== See also ==
- List of Wisconsin Civil War units
- Wisconsin in the American Civil War
