= Angela Morgan =

American poet

Angela Morgan (c. 1875 – January 24, 1957) was an American poet. Her given name at birth was Nina Lillian, which she later changed to Angela.

== Life ==
Nina Lillian Morgan was born in about 1875, either in Washington, D.C., or in Yazoo County, Mississippi. Her father was Albert T. Morgan, a Northern abolitionist who moved to Yazoo City after the Civil War and became a state senator. Her mother was Carrie Highgate, an "Octoroon" member of a prominent family in Syracuse, New York; her eldest sister was Edmonia Highgate. In Reconstruction-era Mississippi their interracial marriage was considered scandalous by white racists.

Her family lived in Washington from 1876 to 1885, and then moved to Lawrence, Kansas, and later to Topeka. In 1890 her father left home to become a gold prospector, and until 1898 Morgan earned money singing in a voice quartet with her three sisters. She married in 1900; the marriage was dissolved in 1906.

Morgan became a journalist for the Chicago Daily American, and later worked on the New York American and on the Boston American. She reported on court cases, published interviews and wrote "human-interest" pieces. She said that her experiences as a reporter motivated and inspired her to social commentary in her poems.

Her first book of poetry, The Hour Has Struck, was published in 1914, and in 1915 a poem appeared in Collier's Weekly. In the same year she was a delegate to the first International Congress of Women at The Hague, in the Netherlands.

Between 1923 and 1926 she lived in London, England. While there, she gave a poetry reading for the Poetry Society at the Savoy Chapel; she was the first woman to be invited to do so.

Morgan had constant money troubles, and was declared bankrupt in 1935. She moved frequently in later life, spending time in Philadelphia, in Rydal, Pennsylvania, in Brattleboro, Vermont, at Saugerties and at Mount Marion, New York, where on January 24, 1957, she died.

== Awards ==
In 1942 Morgan received an honorary doctorate from Golden State University, which at that time was in Los Angeles.

== Publications ==
- The Hour Has Struck (1914)
- Utterance and Other Poems (1916)
- Forward, March (1918)
- Hail, Man (1919)
