= William H. Blyton =

American businessman and politician

William H. Blyton (October 4, 1842 – November 8, 1932) was an American businessman and politician.

Born in Franklinville, New York, Blyton moved to Sparta, Wisconsin in 1854. During the American Civil War, Blyton served in the 19th Wisconsin Volunteer Infantry Regiment and was quartermaster. Blyton was an insurance agent and served as village and city clerk for Sparta, Wisconsin. In 1883, 1885, and 1889, Blyton served in the Wisconsin State Assembly and was a Republican. Blyton died in Sparta, Wisconsin.
