= 19th Wisconsin Infantry Regiment =

Union Army infantry regiment

- Flag of Wisconsin
- Active: April 30, 1862 – August 9, 1865
- Country: United States
- Allegiance: Union
- Branch: Infantry
- Size: Regiment
- Engagements: American Civil War: Siege of Suffolk; Second Battle of New Bern; Second Battle of Fort Darling; Siege of Petersburg; Second Battle of Fair Oaks

Commanders
- Colonel: Horace T. Sanders
- Lt. Col.: Samuel K. Vaughan

The 19th Wisconsin Infantry Regiment was a volunteer infantry regiment that served in the Union Army during the American Civil War.

== Service ==
The 19th Wisconsin was organized at Madison, Wisconsin, and mustered into Federal service April 30, 1862.

The regiment was mustered out on August 9, 1865, at Richmond, Virginia.

== Casualties ==
The 19th Wisconsin suffered 2 officers and 41 enlisted men killed in action or who later died of their wounds, plus another 3 officers and 115 enlisted men who died of disease, for a total of 161 fatalities.

== Commanders ==
- Colonel Horace T. Sanders (November 11, 1861 – April 19, 1865) commanded the regiment through most of the war. He was granted an honorary brevet to brigadier general. Before the war, he was a delegate to the convention which drafted the Constitution of Wisconsin, and was a member of the Wisconsin State Assembly.
- Lieutenant Colonel Samuel K. Vaughan (April 19, 1865 – August 9, 1865) served two years as captain of Co. D, and was then major of the regiment. He was promoted to lieutenant colonel in 1865. He was granted two honorary brevets, to colonel and brigadier general. Before joining the 19th Wisconsin Infantry, he had been a 2nd lieutenant in the 2nd Wisconsin Infantry Regiment.

== Notable people ==
- A. Constantine Barry was the last chaplain of the regiment. Before the war, he had served as the 4th Superintendent of Public Instruction of Wisconsin.
- William H. Blyton was enlisted in Co. C, and later quartermaster sergeant. In November 1864, he was commissioned quartermaster of the 2nd U.S. Infantry Regiment. After the war he became a Wisconsin state legislator.
- Alvan E. Bovay was major of the regiment. He was one of the founders of the Republican Party, and before the war he served two years as a Wisconsin state legislator.
- Alexander Preston Ellinwood was 2nd lieutenant, 1st lieutenant, and finally captain of Co. A. After the war he became a Wisconsin state legislator.
- Joseph Hulbert Nichols was the first chaplain of the regiment, but suffered from delirium brought on by a fever, and died in an asylum in 1863. He was a noted minister and author before the war.
- William Ockler was a private in Co. E and was wounded at Fort Darling. After the war he became a Wisconsin state legislator.
- Otto Puhlman was 1st lieutenant and later captain of Co. G. Earlier in the war, he was a sergeant in Co. C, 4th Wisconsin Infantry Regiment. After the war he became a Wisconsin state legislator and was the first mayor of Plymouth, Wisconsin.
- Casper Schmidt was enlisted in Co. F. After the war he became a Wisconsin state legislator.
- Rollin M. Strong was captain of Co. A, and later served as lieutenant colonel. After the war he became a Wisconsin state legislator.
- Patrick J. Bennett was captain, company commander of Co. E, and was killed in action in the Siege of Petersburg, 1864.

== See also ==
- List of Wisconsin Civil War units
- Wisconsin in the American Civil War
