= Alexander Preston Ellinwood =

American businessman and politician

Alexander Preston Ellinwood (September 9, 1833 – February 6, 1900) was an American businessman, teacher, and politician.

Born in Peterboro, Madison County, New York, Ellinwood went to New York Central College, McGrawville, New York. He then taught and then settled in Reedsburg, Sauk County, Wisconsin, in 1858, where he taught school. During the American Civil War, Ellinwood served in the 19th Wisconsin Volunteer Infantry Regiment and was a captain. After the war, he returned to Reedsburg to teach, and was also involved with real estate, the lumber and general merchandise businesses. Ellinwood was also involved with hops cultivation in Sauk County. Ellinwood served on the Sauk County Board of Supervisors from 1870 to 1875 and was the chairman of the board. He also served as president of the village of Reedsburg in 1872 and 1876 and later served as the second mayor of the city of Reedsburg. In 1878 and 1879, Ellinwood served in the Wisconsin State Assembly as a Republican. Ellinwood died in Reedsburg, Wisconsin.
