= John Johnson (Medal of Honor, 1842) =

American Medal of Honor recipient

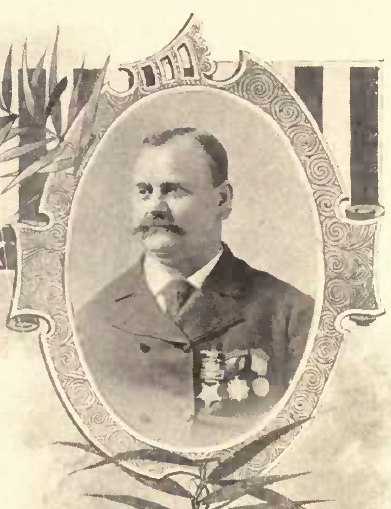
- John Johnson, Medal of Honor recipient
- Born: March 25, 1842; Oslo, Sweden-Norway
- Died: April 3, 1907 (aged 65)
- Burial place: Rock Creek Cemetery; Washington, D.C., U.S.
- Military career
- Allegiance: United States of America; Union
- Branch: United States Army; Union Army
- Service years: 1861–1863
- Rank: Private
- Units: 2nd Wisconsin Volunteer Infantry Regiment; Battery B (Artillery)
- Conflicts: American Civil War; Battle of Antietam; Battle of Fredericksburg (WIA)
- Awards: Medal of Honor

John Johnson (March 25, 1842 – April 3, 1907) served in the Union Army during the American Civil War. He received the Medal of Honor for his actions during the Battle of Antietam and the Battle of Fredericksburg.

Johnson was born on March 25, 1842, in Norway. His official residence was listed as Janesville, Wisconsin.

Johnson was a member of the 2nd Wisconsin Volunteer Infantry Regiment, part of the Iron Brigade. He earned his medal of honor for valor displayed at the Battle of Antietam and the Battle of Fredericksburg. During the Battle of Fredericksburg, while loading a cannon, Confederate artillery fire severed his right arm. He continued to load with his left arm until blood loss caused him to faint. He was discharged from the Army on April 10, 1863.

He died April 3, 1907, and is buried in Rock Creek Cemetery, Washington, D.C.

== Medal of Honor citation ==
His award citation reads:

Conspicuous gallantry in battle in which he was severely wounded [Fredericksburg]. While serving as cannoneer he manned the positions of fallen gunners [Antietam].

== See also ==
- List of Medal of Honor recipients
