= William Emerson Strong =

Union Army officer

William E. Strong
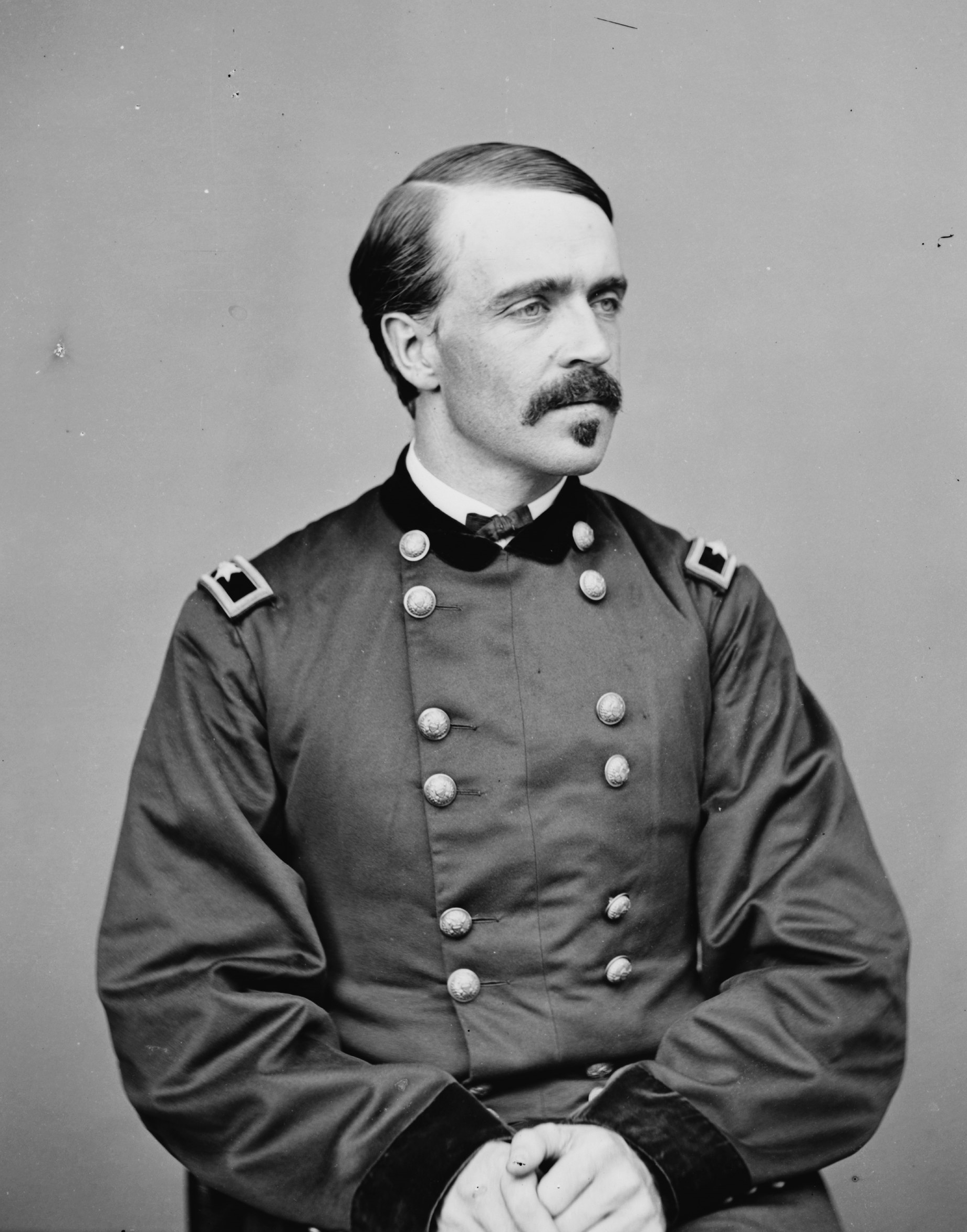
- Photo ca. 1866
- Born: August 10, 1840; Granville, New York, U.S.
- Died: April 10, 1891 (aged 50); Florence, Kingdom of Italy
- Burial place: Graceland Cemetery, Chicago
- Spouse: Mary Bostwick Ogden (m. 1867–1891)
- Children: William E. Strong^{(b. 1870; died 1931)}; Ogden Strong^{(b. 1870)}; Henrietta Ogden (Wurts)^{(b. 1873; died 1922)}; Mary Strong^{(b. 1876)}
- Relatives: John Emerson Strong (father); Simeon Strong (grandfather); Marshall Strong (cousin); Henry W. Strong (cousin)
- Military career
- Allegiance: United States of America (Union)
- Branch: United States Volunteers; Union Army; Illinois National Guard
- Service years: 1861–1866 (USV); 1866–1880 (ILNG)
- Rank: Lt. Colonel, USV; Brevet Brig. General, USV; Colonel, ILNG
- Units: 2nd Reg. Wis. Vol. Infantry; 12th Reg. Wis. Vol. Infantry; XVII Corps; Army of the Tennessee
- Conflicts: American Civil War; Manassas campaign; Vicksburg campaign; Atlanta campaign; Savannah campaign; Carolinas campaign
- Other work: inspector general of the Freedmans Bureau; treasurer of the Sturgeon Bay and Lake Michigan Ship Canal and Harbor company; president of the Peshtigo Lumber Company; director of the World's Columbian Exposition

William Emerson Strong (August 10, 1840 – April 10, 1891) was an American lawyer, businessman, and Wisconsin pioneer. He served as a Union Army officer in the American Civil War, serving as inspector general and acting chief of staff for the Army of the Tennessee; he was then the first inspector general of the Freedmans Bureau and received an honorary brevet to brigadier general at the end of the war. After the war, he married into the family of William B. Ogden and became a partner in several of his business ventures. He was treasurer of the Sturgeon Bay and Lake Michigan Ship Canal and Harbor company, which constructed and operated the Sturgeon Bay Ship Canal, and was also president of the Peshtigo Lumber Company and a director of the World's Columbian Exposition.

== Early life ==
William E. Strong was born in Granville, New York, in 1840. He was raised in that area until age 13, when he moved with his family to a farm in Rock County, Wisconsin. At age 17, he moved to Racine, Wisconsin, to study law under his successful cousin, Marshall Strong. He was set to begin practicing law in 1861, but his bar admission coincided with the Battle of Fort Sumter, which initiated the American Civil War.

== Civil War service ==
After news of the war reached Wisconsin, Strong put his career on hold and raised a company of volunteers from Racine for the Union Army, known as the "Belle City Rifles". The Belle City Rifles were organized as Company F of the 2nd Wisconsin Infantry Regiment when that regiment was established in the spring of 1861, and Strong was elected captain of the company.

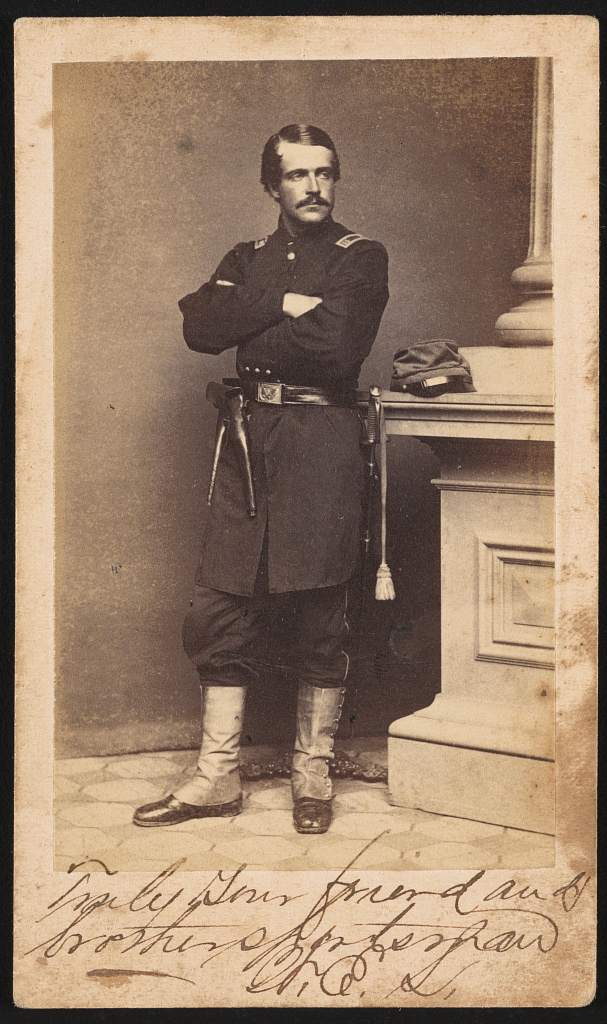
Strong wearing his uniform as a captain, ca. 1862

The 2nd Wisconsin Infantry mustered into federal service on June 11, 1861, and went east to Washington, D.C. Strong led his company through the First Battle of Bull Run. Shortly after Bull Run, Strong accepted a promotion to major and transfer to the 12th Wisconsin Infantry Regiment, which was then being organized in Wisconsin.

The 12th Wisconsin mustered into federal service in January 1862, and went south to Kansas. After preparing for two separate expeditions which were canceled before launching, they were ordered to proceed east to reinforce the siege of Corinth, Mississippi, in May. While en route to Corinth, their orders changed again and they were assigned to repair railroad and hunt for rebel guerillas in western Tennessee for much of the rest of the year. In the fall, they began performing reconnaissance in northern Mississippi in preparation for Grant's Vicksburg Campaign. Around that time, Strong was detached from his regiment and assigned acting assistant inspector general for XVII Corps on the staff of Major General James B. McPherson; the inspector general at the time being Andrew Hickenlooper. He served on McPherson's staff through the entire Siege of Vicksburg, and was given the honor of raising the first American flag over the courthouse in Vicksburg after the Confederate surrender on July 4, 1863.

When McPherson was promoted to command the Army of the Tennessee, Strong went with him and became assistant inspector general for that army. He was with the general just minutes before he was killed during the Battle of Atlanta on July 22, 1864. McPherson had left his staff and gone out on a poorly scouted forest road in a gap between two Union divisions, he ran directly into a band of rebel skirmishers and was shot. His body was left where he fell from his horse, in a wooded area off the side of the road; the area was not controlled by either Union or Confederate forces, and skirmishers from either side were wandering through. Two Union soldiers eventually discovered the general's body, ran back to Union lines and found William Emerson Scott, who they recognized as a member of the general's staff. They explained the situation to Scott, who organized an ambulance and a detail to go collect the general's body. Scott and one of the soldiers then carried McPherson's body out of the roadside thicket to the ambulance, and brought the body back to General William Tecumseh Sherman's headquarters. Strong later wrote an account of McPherson's death as an essay.

After McPherson's death, the Army of the Tennessee was placed under the command of General Oliver Otis Howard; Strong was retained on Howard's staff as inspector general and later as acting chief of staff. He was promoted to lieutenant colonel in November 1864, serving with the army through the Savannah and Carolinas campaigns.

In March 1865, General Howard was appointed commissioner of the newly established Freedmans Bureau, and he brought along Strong to serve as inspector general of the bureau. He served in that role until mustering out of federal service on September 1, 1866. After the war, he was granted a double brevet, with his brevet to colonel retroactive to September 1864, for his service in the Atlanta Campaign, and a brevet to brigadier general effective March 21, 1865, for his service in the Carolinas.

== Business career ==
After mustering out, Strong moved to Chicago and became involved with the business interests of former Chicago mayor William B. Ogden. He was hired as superintendent of the Peshtigo Lumber Works, and shortly after married one of Ogden's nieces. Strong later became president of the Peshtigo works, and at the time of William Ogden's death, in 1877, Strong inherited Ogden's entire ownership stake in the business. Strong also served for more than a decade in the Illinois National Guard as inspector general.

During 1860s and 1870s, Ogden had also worked through the Wisconsin Legislature and U.S. Congress laws to establish a shipping canal through Door County, Wisconsin. That operation was formalized in the 1870s as the Sturgeon Bay and Lake Michigan Ship Canal and Harbor company, with Strong serving as the treasurer of the company. Strong remained as treasurer of the company through the completion of the Sturgeon Bay Ship Canal, and by then also inherited Ogden's ownership stake and board seat.

Strong was also very active in civic affairs in Chicago, and was a member of the board of trustees for the establishment of the Ulysses S. Grant Monument.

In 1890, Strong became a member of the board of the World's Columbian Exposition, preparing for the Chicago World's Fair in 1893. Strong traveled to Italy in 1891, and died in the city of Florence on April 10, 1891.

== Personal life and family ==
William E. Strong was one of at least four children born to John Emerson Strong and his wife Abigail (née Percival). His paternal grandfather was Simeon Strong, who served as a justice of the Massachusetts Supreme Judicial Court and as a Massachusetts state senator. The Strong family were descended from Elder John Strong, who emigrated from England to the Massachusetts Bay Colony in 1630.

William studied law under his first cousin Marshall Strong, who was a prominent pioneer of Racine, Wisconsin, and served as president of the council of the Wisconsin Territory.

William Strong married Mary Bostwick Ogden on April 25, 1867; her father, Mahlon Dickerson Ogden, and uncle, William B. Ogden, were then two of the wealthiest men in Chicago. William Ogden had been the first mayor of Chicago, and then became a major railroad developer. Wedding guests included generals William Tecumseh Sherman, Andrew Hickenlooper, and Oliver Otis Howard; General Cassius Fairchild stood as a groomsman, along with Colonel Lewis Mulford Dayton, a former staffer to General Sherman. Strong had previously officiated and Hickenlooper's wedding earlier that year.

William and Mary Strong had four children together, though one died young.

== Published works ==
- Strong, William E. (1876). A Trip to the Yellowstone National Park in July, August and September 1875.
- Strong, William E. (1891). "The Death of General James B. McPherson". Military Essays and Recollections. Vol. 1. Military Order of the Loyal Legion of the United States. pp. 311–343.
- Strong, William E. (1960). Canadian River Hunt. University of Oklahoma Press.
