= William Biddlecome =

American lawyer (born 1820)

William Roselle Biddlecome (November 27, 1820 – March 6, 1860) was an American lawyer.

Born in Oneida County, New York, he went to Clinton Liberal Institute and graduated from Union College in 1841. He moved to Virginia where he taught school and studied law. In 1845, he moved to Chicago, Illinois, where he was admitted to the Illinois bar. Biddlecome then moved to Potosi, Wisconsin Territory to practice law. In 1851, he served in the Wisconsin State Assembly. In 1852, he moved to St. Louis, Missouri to practice insurance law. In 1859, Biddlecome moved to Florida because of his health and died in St. Augustine, Florida in 1860.
