= Thomas McCarty =

American politician

Thomas McCarty was a member of the Wisconsin State Assembly.

== Biography ==
McCarty was born on October 29, 1838, in Buffalo, New York. He would own a farm in Menomonee, Wisconsin. On February 6, 1894, McCarty married Alice Boyle. His wife died in childbirth the following year. McCarty and his family were Roman Catholics.

== Political career ==
McCarty was a member of the Assembly during the 1870 and 1877 sessions. Other positions he held include Chairman of the town board (similar to city council) of Menomonee and of the county board of Waukesha County, Wisconsin. He was a Democrat.
