= James Aaron Moore =

Mississippi politician

James Aaron Moore (died 1904) was a blacksmith, preacher, alderman, state constitutional convention delegate, bailiff, and state legislator in Mississippi. He represented Lauderdale County, Mississippi in the Mississippi House of Representatives. He was accused of involvement in the Meridian Riot and was forced to flee.

== See also ==
- African American officeholders from the end of the Civil War until before 1900
