= Horace T. Sanders =

American politician (1820–1865)

Horace Turner Sanders (May 1, 1820 – October 6, 1865) was an American politician, lawyer, and military officer.

Born in Sheldon, New York, Sanders received his education in Lockport, New York, and was admitted to the New York Bar. In 1842, he moved to Racine, Wisconsin, where he served as district attorney of Racine County, Wisconsin, under the Wisconsin territorial and state governments. Sanders served in the second Wisconsin Constitutional Convention of 1847, where he helped draft the present Wisconsin Constitution. He also served in the Wisconsin State Assembly in 1853.

During the American Civil War, Sanders served as colonel of the 19th Wisconsin Volunteer Infantry Regiment beginning April 17, 1862. He commanded a brigade in the Army of the James between March 28, 1864, and May 17, 1864. He was mustered out of the volunteers on April 29, 1865. His health suffered as a result of his army service and he died of tuberculosis in Washington, D.C., on October 6, 1865. On January 13, 1866, President Andrew Johnson nominated Sanders for appointment to the grade of brevet brigadier general of volunteers to rank from April 19, 1865, and the United States Senate confirmed the posthumous appointment on March 12, 1866.
