= Alan D. Gaff =

American military historian (born 1948)

Alan D. Gaff (born 1948) is an American military historian, best known for his books focusing on American wars such as On Many a Bloody Field (1997), Bayonets in the Wilderness (2004), Blood in the Argonne (2005), and for his memoir on Lou Gehrig titled Lou Gehrig: The Lost Memoir (2020).

== Early life, education and military service ==
Gaff is from Fort Wayne, Indiana. He graduated with a Bachelor of Arts in history from Indiana University in 1979 and a Master of Arts in history from Ball State University in 1980. Retired sergeant form the United States Army Military Police, where he worked at military prisons.

== Career ==
Gaff retired from the United States Postal Service in 2009 after nearly thirty years.

He is the recipient of an Award of Merit from the Wisconsin Historical Society.

== Selected works ==
- Brave Men's Tears: The Iron Brigade at Brawner Farm. Morningside. 1985. ISBN 978-0-89029-317-1.
- If this is War: A History of the Campaign of Bull's Run by the Wisconsin Regiment Thereafter Known as the Ragged Ass Second. Morningside. 1991. ISBN 978-0-89029-536-6.
- Gaff (1997). On Many a Bloody Field: Four Years in the Iron Brigade. Indiana University Press. ISBN 978-0-253-21294-8.
- Bayonets in the Wilderness: Anthony Wayne's Legion in the Old Northwest. University of Oklahoma Press. 2004. ISBN 978-0-8061-3585-4.
- Blood in the Argonne: The "Lost Battalion" of World War I. University of Oklahoma Press. 2005. ISBN 978-0-8061-3696-7.
- Lou Gehrig: The Lost Memoir. Simon and Schuster. 2020. ISBN 978-1-9821-3241-5.
- Field of Corpses: Arthur St. Clair and the Death of an American Army. Knox Press. 2023. ISBN 978-1-63758-505-4.
