= John Gillespie (Wisconsin politician) =

19th-century American politician (1839–1871)

Member of the Wisconsin State Assembly from the Sauk 2nd district
- In office January 6, 1868 – January 3, 1870
- Preceded by: Stephen Steele Barlow
- Succeeded by: George Gilbert Swain

Personal details
- Born: October 22, 1839 Wigtown, Scotland, UK
- Died: January 21, 1871 (aged 31) Wisconsin Dells, Wisconsin, U.S.
- Resting place: Spring Grove Cemetery, Wisconsin Dells, Wisconsin
- Party: Republican
- Spouse: Lorette Huggins (died 1911)
- Relatives: Thomas Gillespie (brother)
- Occupation: Farmer

Military service
- Allegiance: United States
- Branch/service: United States Volunteers; Union Army
- Years of service: 1861–1865
- Rank: Captain, USV
- Unit: 12th Reg. Wis. Vol. Infantry
- Battles/wars: American Civil War: Vicksburg campaign; Siege of Vicksburg; Battle of Jackson, Mississippi; Meridian campaign; Atlanta campaign; Battle of Kennesaw Mountain; Battle of Atlanta (POW)

John Gillespie (October 22, 1839 – January 21, 1871) was a Scottish American immigrant, farmer, and Republican politician. He served two terms in the Wisconsin State Assembly, representing Sauk County for the 1868 and 1869 terms.

His eldest brother, Thomas Gillespie, also served in the Wisconsin State Assembly.

== Early life ==
John Gillespie was born in Wigtown, Scotland, in October 1839. He emigrated to the United States with his parents in 1847, settling for a time in Vermont, before moving to St. Lawrence County, New York. Both of his parents died there in September 1851. John moved west with his siblings in October 1856, settling at Dellona, in Sauk County, Wisconsin.

== Civil War service ==
At the outbreak of the American Civil War, Gillespie enlisted for service with the Union Army. He was enrolled in Company E of the 12th Wisconsin Infantry Regiment and was elected first lieutenant of the company. The regiment mustered into federal service in October 1861, and proceeded to Missouri for service in the western theater of the war. Within a few months, their captain resigned and Gillespie was promoted to captain as of May 11, 1862.

The regiment was engaged in guard duty in western Kentucky and Tennessee until December 1862, when they joined Ulysses S. Grant's Vicksburg campaign. They participated in the Battle of Jackson and successfully concluded the Siege of Vicksburg. In the consolidation of Union control over Mississippi, they participated in William Tecumseh Sherman's Meridian campaign, which laid waste to central Mississippi en route to capture Meridian, Mississippi.

They then set out on the Atlanta campaign under General Sherman. Gillespie participated in the Battle of Kennesaw Mountain and the Battle of Atlanta. At Atlanta he was wounded and taken prisoner, where his arm was amputated. He remained a prisoner until the end of the war and mustered out in June 1865.

== Postbellum years ==
After the war, Gillespie returned to Dellona and engaged in farming. He was elected to the Wisconsin State Assembly in 1867, running on the Republican Party ticket. He was re-elected in 1868 but was not a candidate for re-election in 1869. After his legislative term, he moved to the city of Kilbourn, Wisconsin, in Columbia County. He died there on January 21, 1871, at age 31. The Grand Army of the Republic post at Kilbourn was named in his honor in 1882.

== Personal life and family ==
John Gillespie's eldest brother, Thomas Gillespie, also served in the Wisconsin State Assembly. His younger brother, James A. Gillespie also served as a Union Army officer near the end of the Civil War, and died about the same young age.

John Gillespie married Lorette Huggins. They had no known children.

Wisconsin State Assembly
Preceded by Stephen Steele Barlow	Member of the Wisconsin State Assembly from the Sauk 2nd district January 6, 1868 – January 3, 1870	Succeeded by George Gilbert Swain
