= John DeWolf =

John DeWolf or John de Wolf is the name of:

- John DeWolf (judge) (1760–1841), justice of the Rhode Island Supreme Court
- John DeWolf (sea captain), Rhode Island sea captain
- John DeWolf (politician) (1817–1895), member of the Wisconsin State Assembly
- John de Wolf (politician) (c. 1931–2003), Canadian politician
- John de Wolf (born 1962), Dutch footballer
