= Stephen Steele Barlow =

American politician (1818–1900)

Stephen S. Barlow

10th Attorney General of Wisconsin
- In office January 3, 1870 – January 5, 1874
- Governor: Lucius Fairchild; Cadwallader C. Washburn
- Preceded by: Charles R. Gill
- Succeeded by: A. Scott Sloan

Member of the Wisconsin Senate from the 14th district
- In office January 6, 1868 – January 3, 1870
- Preceded by: Argalus Starks
- Succeeded by: Bennett Strong

Member of the Wisconsin State Assembly
- In office January 7, 1867 – January 6, 1868
- Preceded by: Rollin M. Strong
- Succeeded by: John Gillespie
- Constituency: Sauk 2nd district
- In office January 5, 1852 – January 3, 1853
- Preceded by: Wyman Spooner
- Succeeded by: Joseph Seaver
- Constituency: Walworth 5th district

District Attorney of Sauk County, Wisconsin
- In office January 6, 1862 – January 1, 1866
- Preceded by: N. W. Wheeler
- Succeeded by: Smith S. Wilkinson

County Judge of Sauk County, Wisconsin
- In office January 4, 1858 – January 6, 1862
- Preceded by: E. G. Wheeler
- Succeeded by: John B. Quimby

District Attorney of Walworth County, Wisconsin
- In office January 3, 1853 – January 2, 1854
- Preceded by: Urban D. Meacham
- Succeeded by: Alfred S. Spooner
- In office January 1, 1844 – January 3, 1848
- Preceded by: Experience Estabrook
- Succeeded by: Urban D. Meacham

Personal details
- Born: August 17, 1818 Ballston Spa, New York, U.S.
- Died: October 5, 1900 (aged 82) St. Paul, Minnesota, U.S.
- Resting place: Walnut Hill Cemetery, Baraboo, Wisconsin
- Party: Republican; Natl. Union (1864–1867); Free Soil (before 1854)
- Spouse: Anna Maria Parsons (died 1881)
- Children: Mary E. (Freeman); (b. 1846; died 1932)

Stephen Steele Barlow (August 17, 1818 – October 5, 1900) was an American lawyer and Republican politician. He was the 10th Attorney General of Wisconsin and served four years in the Wisconsin Legislature. He also served several years as a district attorney and county judge.

== Background ==
Barlow was born on August 17, 1818, in Ballston Spa, New York, and moved with his family at an early age to Genesee County, New York. He attended public schools and was graduated from Rochester Seminary in New York in 1837. He began reading the law in Albany, New York.

== In Wisconsin ==
Barlow came to Wisconsin about 1840, continued his legal studies, and settled at Delavan in Walworth County, where in 1841 he was admitted to the bar. He was elected as a Free Soiler member of the Assembly from Walworth county in 1851 for a one-year term, and in 1853 became that county's district attorney.

He moved to Sauk County in May 1854, settled in Delton (then called New Buffalo) in 1855, and was elected as a County Judge in 1857, for the term of four years.

== Republican politician ==
By the beginning of the 1860 presidential election campaign, he had become part of the Republican Party, declaring that "the spirit of abolition is the spirit of the Republican Party", and that the Republicans, considering slavery "morally and politically wrong", opposed its spread as the first step in its complete abolition. He was elected District Attorney of Sauk County in 1862, and re-elected in 1864. he was elected to Sauk County's 2nd Assembly district (Towns of New Buffalo, Dellona, Winfield, La Valle, Woodland, Ironton, Reedsburg, Excelsior, Baraboo, Fairfield, Greenfield and Freedom) for 1867, succeeding fellow Republican Rollin Strong; then to the Wisconsin State Senate's 14th District from 1868 to 1869, to succeed Argalus Starks (a War Democrat then part of the Union Party). He was succeeded in the Assembly by John Gillespie. He was a Republican elector for Ulysses S Grant in 1868.

He was elected Wisconsin Attorney General in 1869 with 69,746 votes, against 60,510 for Democrat Silas U. Pinney., being succeeded in the Senate by fellow Republican Bennett Strong, and re-elected in 1871, with 78,326 votes against 68,807 for Edward S. Bragg, Democrat.

== After serving as Attorney General ==
Except for a two-year sojourn in Chippewa Falls, Barlow lived in Delton and Baraboo until 1893, when he moved to the St. Paul, Minnesota, home of his son Henry P. Barlow. He died there on October 5, 1900.

== Electoral history ==
=== Wisconsin Attorney General (1869, 1871) ===
Wisconsin Attorney General Election, 1869
Party	Candidate	Votes	%	±%
General Election, November 2, 1869
Republican	Stephen S. Barlow	69,746	53.54%	+1.89%
Democratic	Silas U. Pinney	60,520	46.46%	
Plurality		9,226	7.08%	+3.78%
Total votes		130,266	100.0%	-8.49%
Republican hold				

Wisconsin Attorney General Election, 1871
Party	Candidate	Votes	%	±%
General Election, November 7, 1871
Republican	Stephen S. Barlow (incumbent)	78,326	53.23%	−0.31%
Democratic	Edward S. Bragg	68,807	46.77%	
Plurality		9,519	6.47%	-0.61%
Total votes		147,133	100.0%	+12.95%
Republican hold				

Party political offices
Preceded by Charles R. Gill	Republican nominee for Attorney General of Wisconsin; 1869, 1871	Succeeded by A. Scott Sloan
Wisconsin State Assembly
Preceded by Wyman Spooner	Member of the Wisconsin State Assembly from the Walworth 5th district January 5, 1852 – January 3, 1853	Succeeded by Joseph Seaver
Preceded by Rollin M. Strong	Member of the Wisconsin State Assembly from the Sauk 2nd district January 7, 1867 – January 6, 1868	Succeeded by John Gillespie
Wisconsin Senate
Preceded by Argalus Starks	Member of the Wisconsin Senate from the 14th district January 6, 1868 – January 3, 1870	Succeeded by Bennett Strong
Legal offices
Preceded by Experience Estabrook	District Attorney of Walworth County, Wisconsin; January 1, 1844 – January 3, 1848	Succeeded by Urban D. Meacham
Preceded by Urban D. Meacham	District Attorney of Walworth County, Wisconsin; January 3, 1853 – January 2, 1854	Succeeded by Alfred S. Spooner
Preceded by E. G. Wheeler	County Judge of Sauk County, Wisconsin; January 4, 1858 – January 6, 1862	Succeeded by John B. Quimby
Preceded by Nelson W. Wheeler	District Attorney of Sauk County, Wisconsin; January 6, 1862 – January 1, 1866	Succeeded by Smith S. Wilkinson
Preceded by Charles R. Gill	Attorney General of Wisconsin; January 3, 1870 – January 5, 1874	Succeeded by A. Scott Sloan
