= Bennett Strong =

American politician (1819–1906)

Bennett U. Strong

Member of the Wisconsin Senate from the 14th district
- In office January 3, 1870 – January 1, 1872
- Preceded by: Stephen Steele Barlow
- Succeeded by: John B. Quimby

Personal details
- Born: April 28, 1819 Woodbury, Connecticut, U.S.
- Died: February 1, 1906 (aged 86) Los Angeles County, California, U.S.
- Resting place: Hollywood Forever Cemetery, Los Angeles, California
- Party: Republican; Prohibition (after 1890)
- Spouse: Mary Hawkins Green (m. 1847; died 1906)
- Children: Ella, Willie

Bennett U. Strong (April 28, 1819 – February 1, 1906) was an American businessman, Republican politician, and the first settler at Spring Green, Wisconsin. He served two years in the Wisconsin State Senate, representing Sauk County.

== Biography ==
Bennett Strong was born in Woodbury, Connecticut, in 1819. He was raised and educated there and came to Wisconsin in 1853, settling at Janesville. In 1857, he relocated to the town of Spring Green in Sauk County, where he was the first settler at what would become the village of Spring Green. He owned a farm and operated a hotel there, and represented Spring Green for seven years on the Sauk County board of supervisors. He also served as justice of the peace.

In 1869, he was elected on the Republican Party ticket to the Wisconsin State Senate, representing all of Sauk County. In the Legislature, he served on the committees on incorporations, on legislative expenditures, and on military affairs. He did not run for re-election in 1871.

Later in life, Strong became affiliated with the Prohibition Party, and, in 1890, he was nominated for Wisconsin State Assembly on the Prohibition ticket in Sauk County's 1st Assembly district. He came in third in the general election, behind Democrat Thomas William English and Republican William F. Conger.

Sometime after 1892, Strong and his wife moved to Los Angeles County, California, where he died in 1906.

== Electoral history ==
=== Wisconsin Senate (1869) ===
Wisconsin Senate, 14th District Election, 1869
Party	Candidate	Votes	%	±%
General Election, November 2, 1869
Republican	Bennett U. Strong	1,833	71.77%	
Democratic	Thomas T. English	721	28.23%	
Plurality		1,112	43.54%	
Total votes		2,554	100.0%	
Republican hold				

=== Wisconsin Assembly (1890) ===
Wisconsin Assembly, Sauk 1st District Election, 1890
Party	Candidate	Votes	%	±%
General Election, November 4, 1890
Democratic	Thomas William English	1,163	49.07%	
Republican	William F. Conger	1,048	44.22%	
Prohibition	Bennett U. Strong	159	6.71%	
Plurality		115	4.85%	
Total votes		2,370	100.0%	
Democratic gain from Republican				

Wisconsin Senate
Preceded by Stephen Steele Barlow	Member of the Wisconsin Senate from the 14th district January 3, 1870 – January 1, 1872	Succeeded by John B. Quimby
