= Chicago and North Western Railway =

Railroad in the Midwestern United States

Chicago and North Western

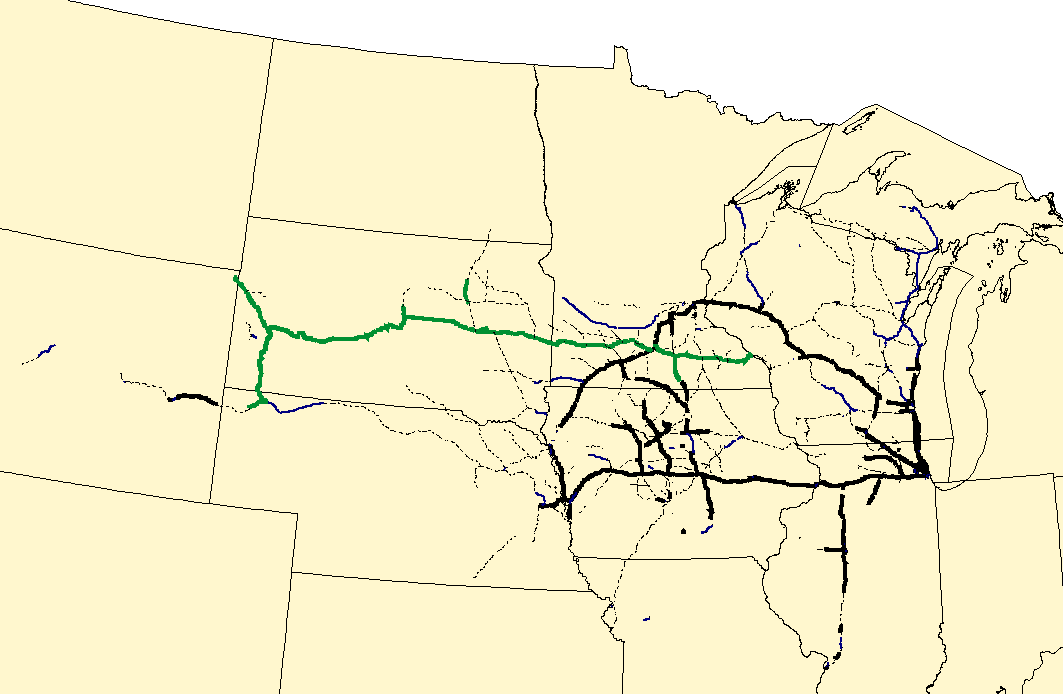
- Map of the Chicago and North Western Railway. Black lines are trackage owned by the Union Pacific Railroad, green lines are owned by the Dakota, Minnesota and Eastern Railroad, blue lines are owned by other railroads, and dotted lines are abandoned.

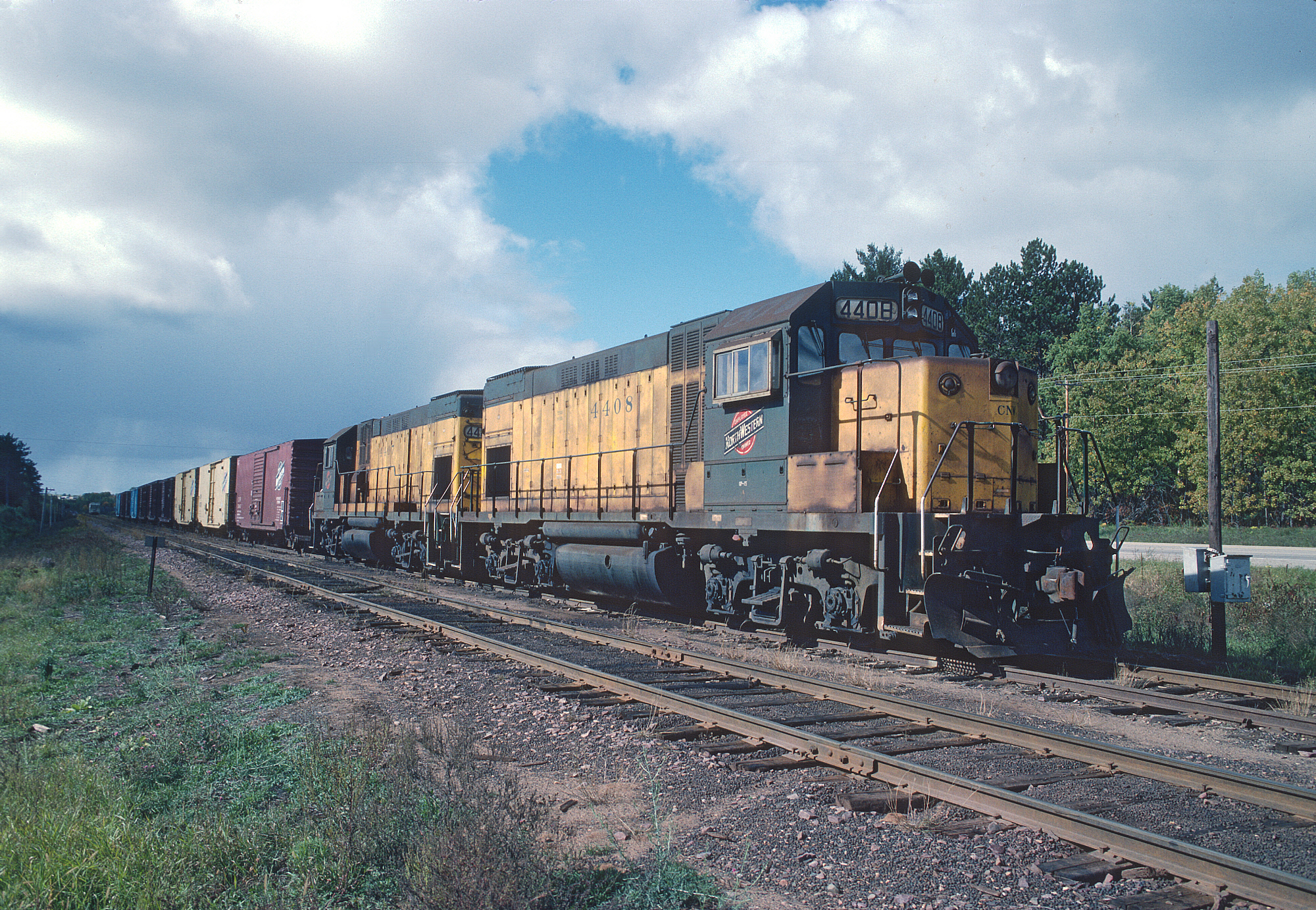
- A North Western freight train, led by EMD GP15-1 No. 4408, travels through Niagara, Wisconsin, on October 5, 1988.

Overview
- Headquarters: Chicago, Illinois
- Reporting mark: CNW
- Locale: Illinois, Iowa, Kansas, Michigan, Minnesota, Missouri, Nebraska, North Dakota, South Dakota, Wisconsin, and Wyoming
- Dates of operation: 1859–1995
- Successor: Union Pacific Railroad; Some trackage in Wisconsin is operated by the Wisconsin and Southern Railroad

Technical
- Track gauge: 4 ft 8 1/2 in (1,435 mm) standard gauge

The Chicago and North Western (reporting mark CNW) also known as the "North Western" was an American Class I railroad that operated from 1851 to 1995 in the Midwestern United States. The railroad operated more than 5,000 miles (8,000 km) of track at the turn of the 20th century, and over 12,000 miles (19,000 km) of track in seven states before retrenchment in the late 1970s. Until 1972, when the employees purchased the company, it was named the Chicago and North Western Railway (or Chicago and North Western Railway Company).

The C&NW became one of the longest railroads in the United States as a result of mergers with other railroads, such as the Chicago Great Western Railway, Minneapolis and St. Louis Railway and others. By 1995, track sales and abandonment had reduced the total mileage to about 5,000. The majority of the abandoned and sold lines were lightly trafficked branches in Iowa, Illinois, Minnesota, South Dakota and Wisconsin. Large line sales, such as those that resulted in the Dakota, Minnesota and Eastern Railroad, further helped reduce the railroad to a mainline core with several regional feeders and branches. Union Pacific (UP) purchased the company in April 1995 and integrated it with its own operation.

== History ==
=== 1859 to 1968 ===
The Chicago and North Western Railway was chartered on June 7, 1859, five days after it purchased the assets of the bankrupt Chicago, St. Paul and Fond du Lac Railroad. On February 15, 1865, it merged with the Galena and Chicago Union Railroad, which had been chartered on January 16, 1836. Since the Galena & Chicago Union started operating in December 1848, and the Fond du Lac railroad started in March 1855, the Galena and Chicago Union Railroad is considered to be the origin of the North Western railroad system. Other lines acquired and added to the network included the Chicago, St. Paul and Fond du Lac Railroad in 1859, the Winona and St. Peter Railroad in 1867, the Chicago, Milwaukee and North Western Railway in 1883, the Sioux City and Pacific Railroad in 1880, the Fremont, Elkhorn and Missouri Valley Railroad in 1884, and the Milwaukee, Lake Shore and Western Railway in 1893. They also held extensive property in Michigan, particularly its Upper Peninsula, to the point where they were one of the largest property owners in the state. By 1899, the company had rostered 1,380 locomotives, 1,176 passenger cars, and 49,484 freight cars.

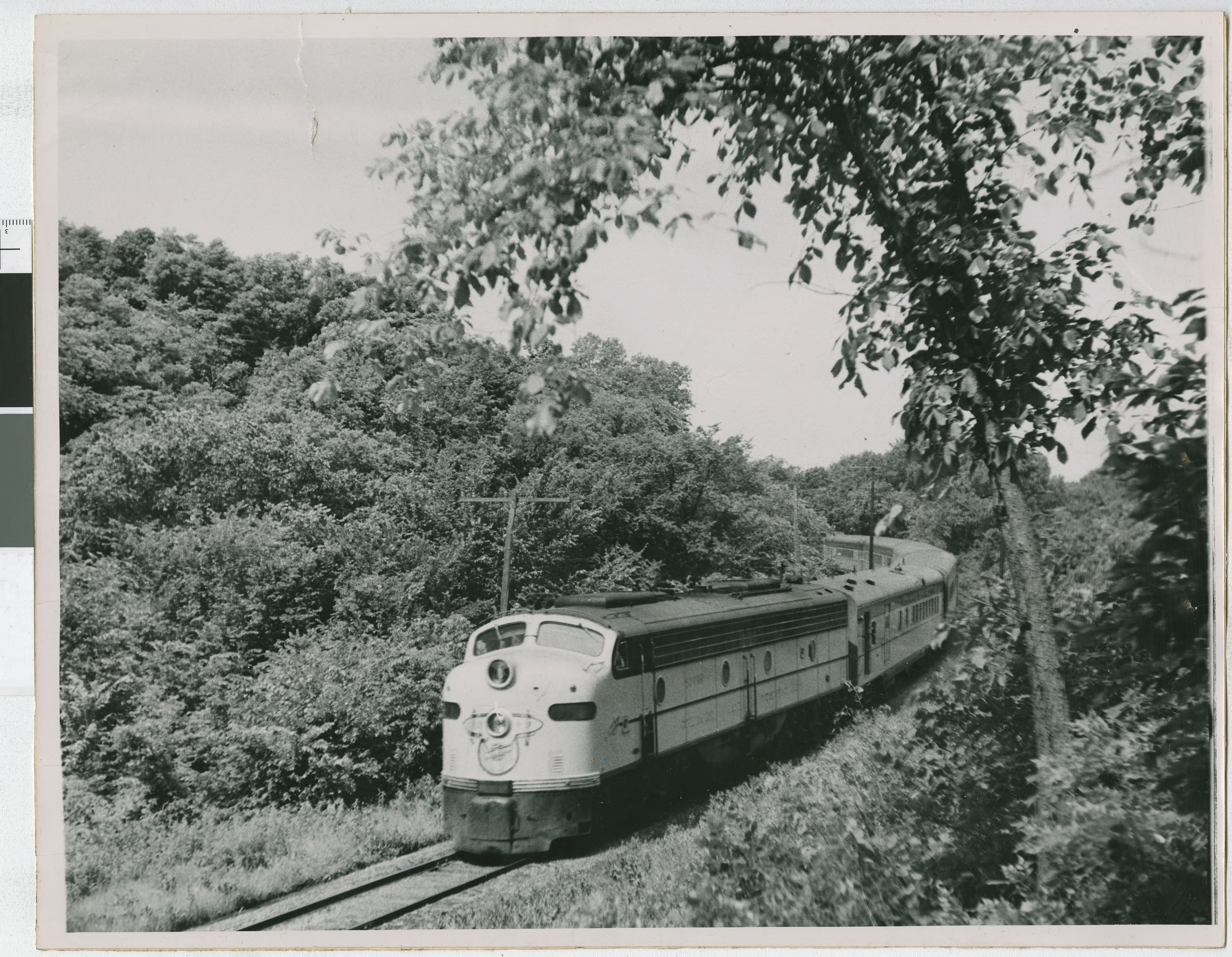
A Chicago and North Western train in Blue Earth County, Minnesota, 1940s. Blue Earth County Historical Society collection.

The first repair facilities for rolling stock were located along the Chicago River near the center of Chicago, but these were abandoned for a more extensive, 240-acre plot of land to the west along West Kinzie Street. The facilities were expanded in 1900 and became known as the 40th Street Shops, which at that point included three roundhouses, extensive locomotive overhauling capabilities, and a complete set of passenger and freight car shops. These shops served the eastern section of the CNW system. Meanwhile, the western section was served by back shops in Clinton, Iowa and the northern section was served by facilities in Winona, Minnesota. In 1911 a new freight yard and shops were built 13 miles west of Chicago in Proviso Township, which featured a mammoth, 58-stall roundhouse (a twin of the one in Fulton, Illinois).

Changing traffic patterns and competition with automobiles and trucking disrupted the railroad's profitability by mid-20th century. After nine years in bankruptcy, the CNW was reorganized in 1944. It had turned rapidly to diesel power, and established a huge diesel shop in Chicago. Its Proviso Freight Yard, located 12 miles (19 km) west of the city center in suburban Cook County, was constructed between 1926 and 1929 and remained the largest such in the world, with 224 miles of trackage and a capacity of more than 20,000 cars.

Potatoes from the west were one of the main crops carried by the CNW, and its potato sheds in Chicago were the nation's largest. It also carried western sugar beets and huge amounts of corn and wheat. This road, like other lines depending strongly on transportation of crops, was adversely affected by government agricultural credit policies, which sealed a lot of products on the farms where they were produced. Although it stood sixteenth in operating revenue in 1938, it was eighth in passenger revenue among American railroads. It served Chicago commuters; its 400 streamliners provided intercity transportation, and it provided an eastern link to bring the Union Pacific's passengers from Omaha, Nebraska, and points west to Chicago.

The CNW had owned a majority of the stock of the Chicago, St. Paul, Minneapolis and Omaha Railway (Omaha Road) since 1882. On January 1, 1957, it leased the company, and merged it into the North Western in 1972. The Omaha Road's main line extended from an interchange with the North Western at Elroy, Wisconsin, to the Twin Cities, south to Sioux City, Iowa, and then finally to Omaha, Nebraska.

The CNW acquired several important short railroads during its later years. It completed acquisition of the Litchfield and Madison Railway on January 1, 1958. The Litchfield and Madison railroad was a 44-mile (71 km) bridge road from East St. Louis to Litchfield, Illinois. On July 30, 1968, the North Western acquired two former interurbans—the 36-mile (58 km) Des Moines and Central Iowa Railway (DM&CI), and the 110-mile (180 km) Fort Dodge, Des Moines and Southern Railway (FDDM&S). The DM&CI gave access to the Firestone plant in Des Moines, Iowa, and the FDDM&S provided access to gypsum mills in Fort Dodge, Iowa.

On November 1, 1960, the CNW acquired the rail properties of the 1,500-mile (2,400 km) Minneapolis and St. Louis Railway. In spite of its name, it ran only from Minneapolis, Minnesota, to Peoria, Illinois. This acquisition provided traffic and modern rolling stock, and eliminated competition.

=== 1968 to 1984 ===
On July 1, 1968, the 1,500 mi (2,400 km) Chicago Great Western Railway merged with the North Western. This railroad extended between Chicago and Oelwein, Iowa. From there lines went to the Twin Cities, Omaha, Nebraska, and Kansas City, Missouri. A connection from Hayfield, Minnesota, to Clarion, Iowa, provided a Twin Cities to Omaha main line. The Chicago Great Western duplicated the North Western's routes from Chicago to the Twin Cities and Omaha, but went the long way. This merger provided access to Kansas City and further eliminated competition. After abandoning a plan to merge with the Milwaukee Road in 1970, Benjamin W. Heineman, who headed the CNW and parent Northwest Industries since 1956, arranged the sale of the railroad to its employees in 1972; they formed Northwest Industries to take over the CNW in 1968. The words "Employee Owned" were part of the company logo in the ensuing period. The railroad was renamed from Chicago and North Western Railway to Chicago and North Western Transportation Company. The railroad's reporting marks (CNW) remained the same.

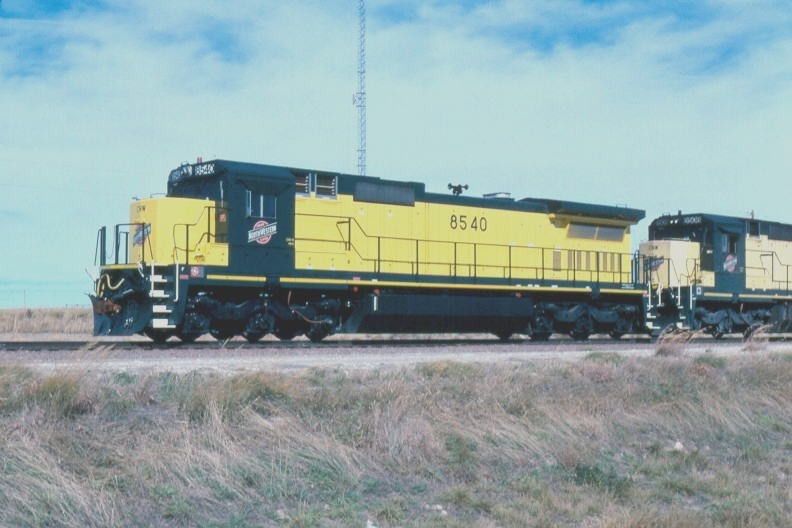
C&NW #8540 at Shawnee, Wyoming, in 1990

After the Chicago, Rock Island and Pacific Railroad (Rock Island) ceased operating on March 31, 1980, the North Western won a bidding war with the Soo Line Railroad to purchase the roughly 400-mile (640 km) "Spine Line" between the Twin Cities and Kansas City, Missouri, via Des Moines, Iowa. The Interstate Commerce Commission (ICC) approved North Western's bid of $93 million on June 20, 1983. The line was well-engineered, but because of deferred maintenance on the part of the bankrupt Rock Island, it required a major rehabilitation in 1984. The company then began to abandon the Oelwein to Kansas City section of its former Chicago Great Western trackage, which duplicated Spine Line service.

=== 1985 to 1995 ===
In 1985, the CNW Corporation was formed to take over the Chicago and North Western Transportation Company; the employee-owned stock of the Chicago and North Western Transportation Company was transferred to the new CNW Corporation.

In 1988, the Blackstone Capital Partners formed the Chicago and North Western Acquisition Corporation to purchase the CNW Corporation; the CNW Corporation was acquired by Blackstone Capital Partners under the Chicago and North Western Acquisition Corporation subsidiary from the employee owned stock; Blackstone Capital Partners controls the CNW Corporation and the Chicago and North Western Transportation Company under the Chicago and North Western Acquisition Corporation subsidiary. Chicago and North Western Holdings Corporation (or "CNW Holdings Corporation" and "Chicago and North Western Holdings Company") was formed and took control of the Chicago and North Western Acquisition Corporation, which controlled the CNW Corporation and which the CNW Corporation controlled the Chicago and North Western Transportation Company.

The Chicago and North Western corporate structure under the Blackstone ownership:

- Chicago and North Western Holdings Corporation
  - Chicago and North Western Acquisition Corporation
    - CNW Corporation
      - Chicago and North Western Transportation Company (formerly Chicago and North Western Railway)

In 1993, several of the C&NW's routes became flooded by that year's Great Flood, which also affected other railroads that operated in the Midwest. The first routes on the C&NW to be flooded were the routes south of St. Paul, Minnesota. Ten miles of their line between North Freedom, Baraboo, and Devil's Lake were also flooded, and it isolated the C&NW's quarry supply in Rock Springs (a vintage diesel switcher from the nearby Mid-Continent Railway Museum assisted the Rock Springs quarry, until the flood cleared). During July, the C&NW's dry mainline through Iowa also became flooded. Upon learning about the flooding, some C&NW employees called into work during their time off, in order to help the railroad through the flood. By the time the flood ended, most of the C&NW's rail lines remained intact and were quickly reopened.

In February 1994, the Chicago and North Western Acquisition Corporation and the CNW Corporation merged into the Chicago and North Western Holdings Corporation, leaving only the Chicago and North Western Holdings Corporation and the Chicago and North Western Transportation Company. In May 1994, the Chicago and North Western Transportation Company reverted to its original name, Chicago and North Western Railway and the Chicago and North Western Holdings Corporation was renamed to the second Chicago and North Western Transportation Company.

The Chicago and North Western corporate structure:

- Chicago and North Western Transportation Company (formerly Chicago and North Western Holdings Corporation)
  - Chicago and North Western Railway (formerly Chicago and North Western Transportation Company)

In April 1995, the Union Pacific Corporation acquired the former Chicago and North Western Holdings Corporation (the second Chicago and North Western Transportation Company) under subsidiary UP Rail, Union Pacific controls the former Chicago and North Western Holdings Corporation (now the second Chicago and North Western Transportation Company) and the Chicago and North Western Railway (formerly the first Chicago and North Western Transportation Company) under UP Rail subsidiary.

The Chicago and North Western corporate structure under Union Pacific ownership:

- UP Rail
  - Chicago and North Western Transportation Company (formerly Chicago and North Western Holdings Corporation)
    - Chicago and North Western Railway (formerly Chicago and North Western Transportation Company)

The Union Pacific Corporation merged UP Rail into Union Pacific and then merged the second Chicago and North Western Transportation Company and the Chicago and North Western Railway into the Union Pacific Railroad; the Chicago and North Western system became part of the Union Pacific Railroad system. A joint UP-CNW subsidiary, Western Railroad Properties, Inc., was also merged into the Union Pacific system in the acquisition.

=== Post-CNW ===
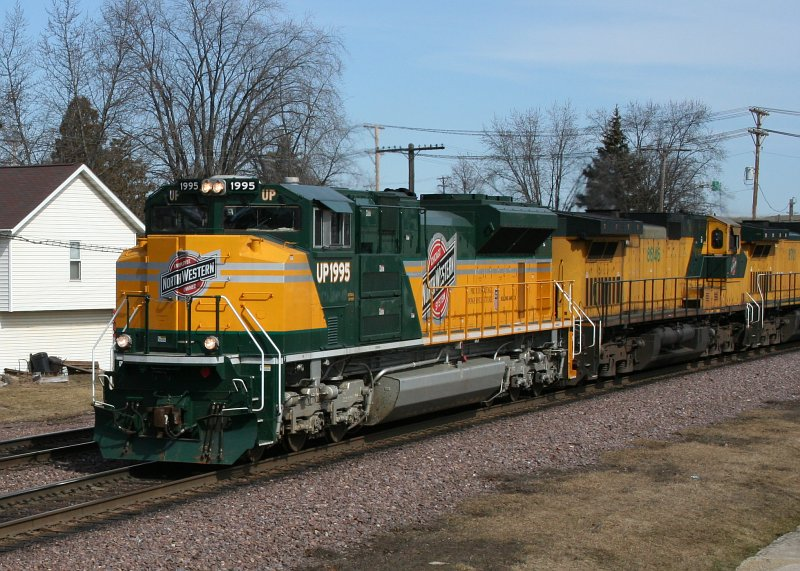
UP Heritage Unit#1995 and two former CNW Dash 9's (CNW 8646 & 8701) lead a train through Rochelle Railroad Park.

Chicago and North Western locomotives continued to operate in their own paint schemes for several years after the acquisition (although some of them were gradually repainted into UP colors.) Many former CNW units have received "patches" with a new road number and reporting mark to match their new owner's roster. Only one "patched" unit remains on the Union Pacific, UP AC4400CW 6706 (ex 8804). Several others work under different owners. CNW 8646 and 8701 were the last unpatched CNW locomotives on the UP roster, leading many railfans to refer to them as the "CNW Twins". In early 2018, after years of surviving untouched, they were repainted and renumbered to 9750 (ex 8646) and 9805 (ex 8701) respectively; they were the final locomotives on the UP roster to not wear UP reporting marks. 9750 is in storage as of 2020, while 9805 is active and was rebuilt by GE/Wabtec into an AC44C6M (classified by UP as a 'C44ACM'). CNW 6847 (EMD SD40-2) and CNW 7009 (EMD SD50) are preserved at the Illinois Railway Museum in their original factory paint. CNW 1518 (EMD GP7), CNW 411 (EMD F7A), and CNW 414 (F7A, preserved as METX 308) are also at IRM, with 1518 and 411 having been restored in CNW paint. CNW 4153 works at a grain elevator in Fremont, Nebraska, while several other GP7s, GP9s, and a few other CNW locomotives are owned by regional railroads, short lines, or industries. As of 2025, 6706 has yet to be repainted.

In the mid-2000s, Union Pacific released six "Heritage" EMD SD70ACe units to represent the paint schemes of companies absorbed by UP. After painting at the Wisconsin and Southern Railroad's Horicon, Wisconsin shop, UP 1995, painted in a "Heritage" C&NW paint scheme, was unveiled on July 15, 2006, at North Western Station in Chicago, Illinois. In 2020, Metra repainted METX 90, an EMD F59PHI, in a CNW heritage livery. The North Western Station was rechristened to the Ogilvie Transportation Center in 1997 to honor Richard B. Ogilvie, a former governor of Illinois and the creator of the Regional Transportation Authority, the financial and oversight body which includes Metra. The station serves as UP's Metra terminus for its three lines (Union Pacific West Line, Union Pacific Northwest Line, and Union Pacific North Line). However, many longtime Chicago residents still refer to the station as "North Western Station", and many longtime employees still call it "CPT", for "Chicago Passenger Terminal".

=== C&NW Tables ===
Revenue Freight Ton-Miles (Millions)
| | C&NW + CStPM&O | CGW | M&StL | L&M |
|---|---|---|---|---|
| 1925 | 9,866 | 1,967 | 1,217 | 28 |
| 1933 | 5,641 | 1,430 | 645 | 38 |
| 1944 | 13,609 | 3104 | 1,503 | 89 |
| 1960 | 12,225 | 2,474 | 1,181 (merged C&NW 1960) | (merged C&NW) |
| 1970 | 19,729 | (merged) | | |

Route miles operated at end of year
| | C&NW | CStPM&O | CGW | M&StL | L&M |
|---|---|---|---|---|---|
| 1925 | 8,469 | 1,842 | 1,496 | 1,628 | 44 |
| 1956 | 7,787 | 1,616 | 1,470 | 1,397 | 44 |
| 1970 | 11,046 | | | | |
| 1981 | 8,256 | | | | |

== Passenger train service ==
=== Commercial passenger and commuter service ===
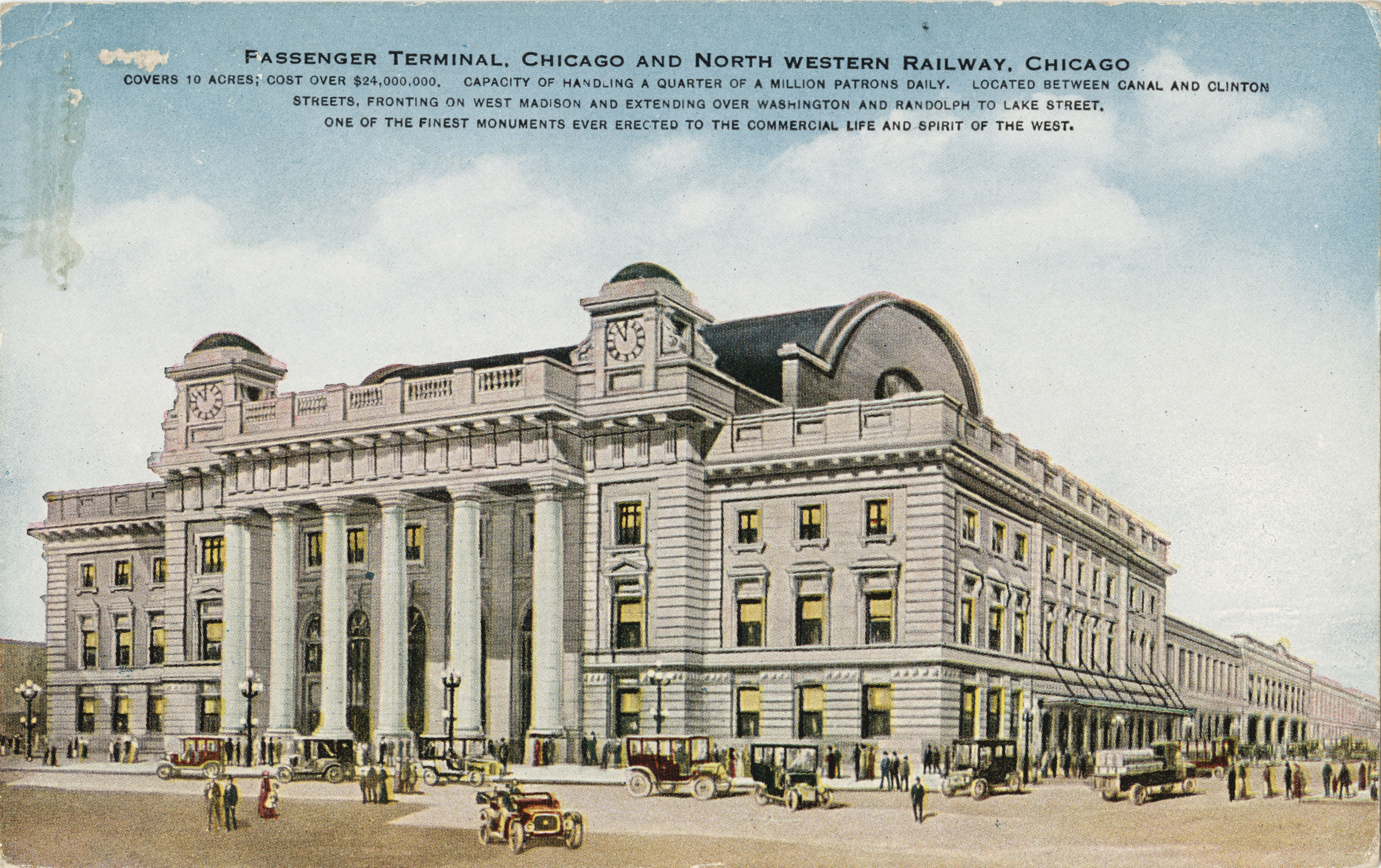
Passenger terminal, Chicago and North Western Railway, Chicago, Illinois, circa 1911–1914

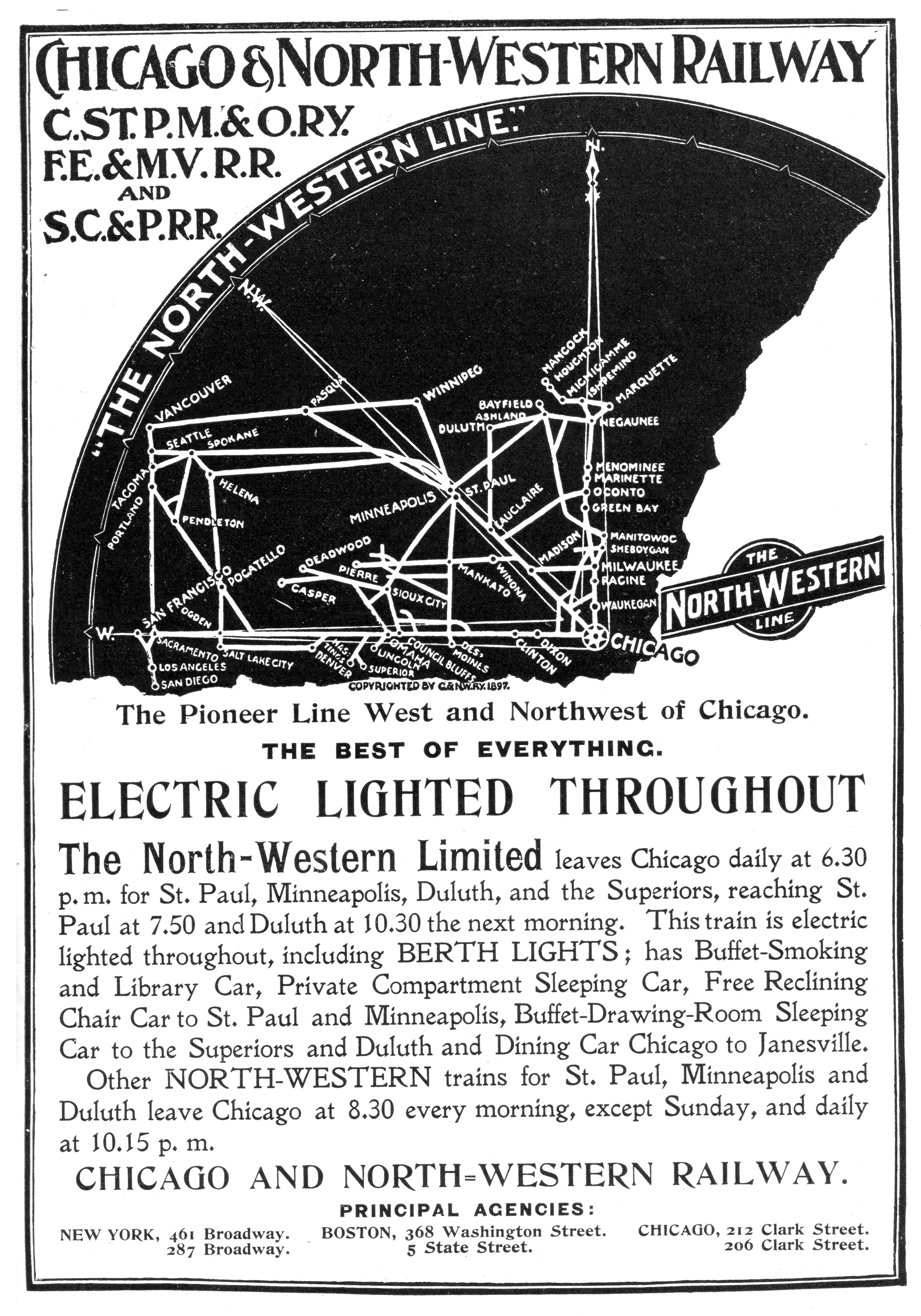
Advertisement for C&NWRY passenger service, 1898

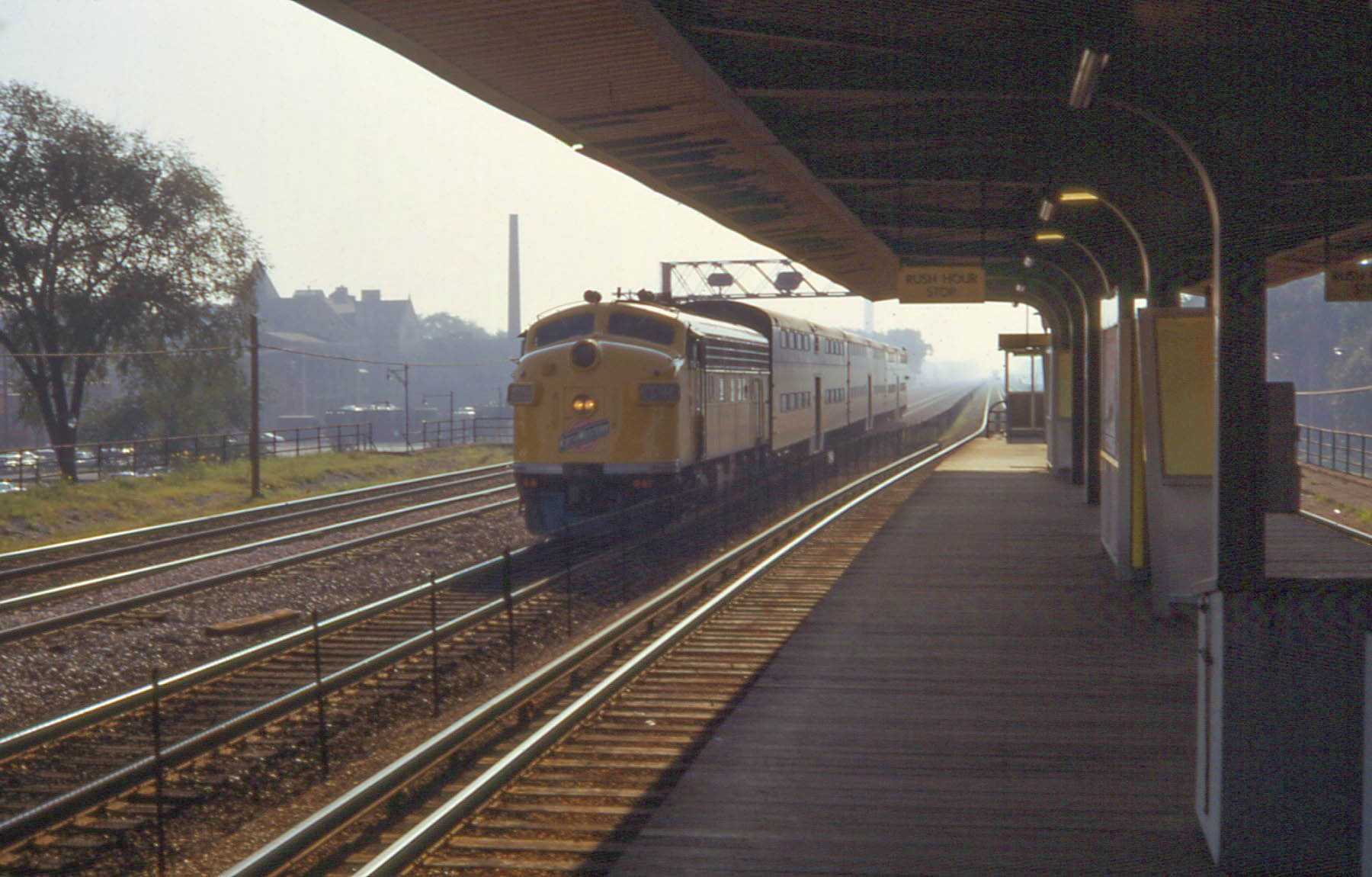
A C&NW commuter train at Oak Park, 1968

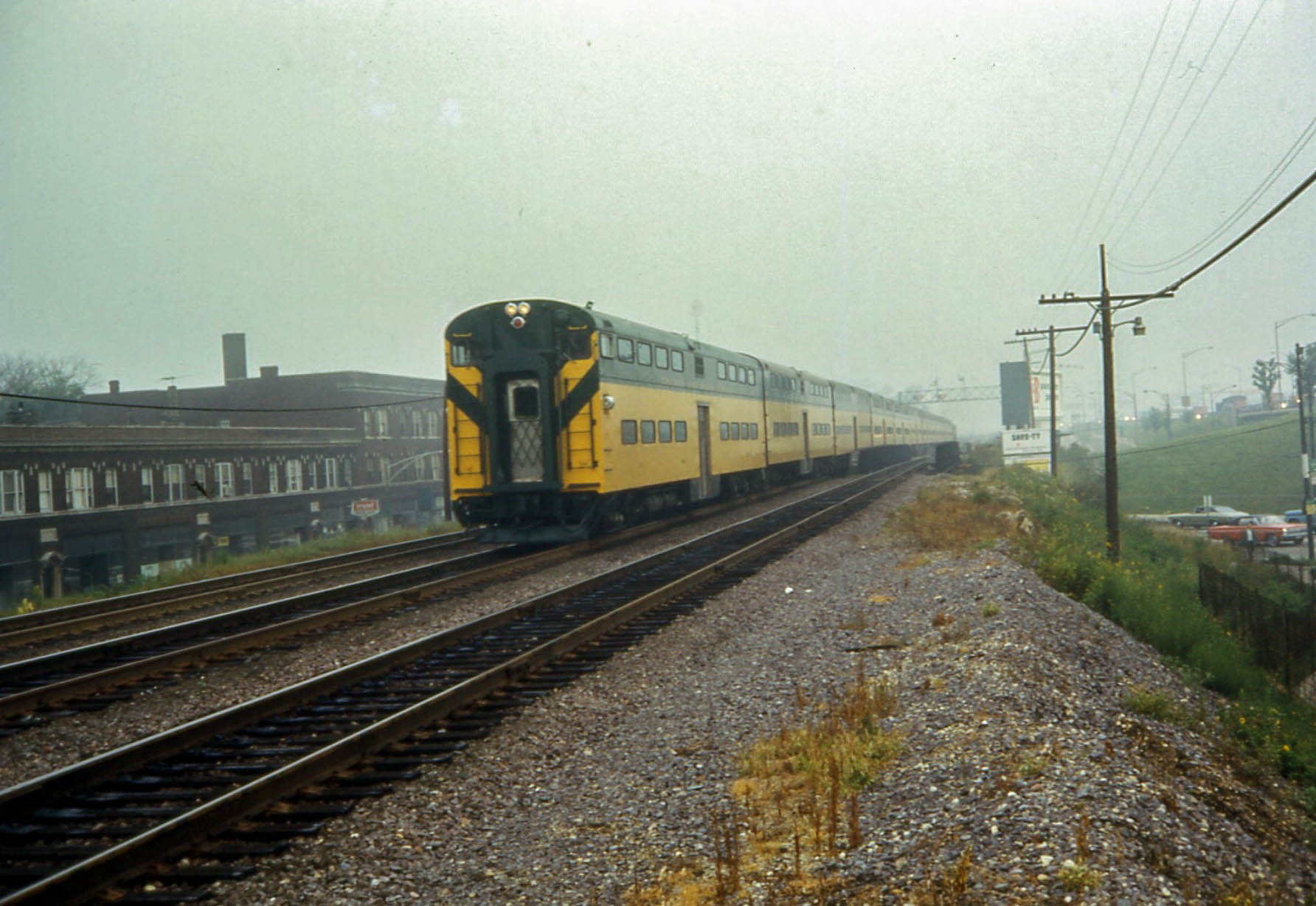
A cab car leads an inbound Northwest Line train through Irving Park. Most commuter rail lines in Chicago, including the Metra, used cars of this design.

The CNW's most famous train, the Twin Cities 400 from Chicago to Minneapolis/St. Paul, was introduced in 1935 to compete with the Chicago, Burlington and Quincy's Zephyrs and the Milwaukee Road's Hiawathas. This train was so named because it traveled the 400 mi (640 km) between the cities in 400 minutes. CNW was the first system to start a high-speed Chicago-Twin Cities schedule because it used refurbished rather than new equipment, but in 1939, modernized the 400 with new E3A diesel locomotive pairs and streamlined cars. Other named trains the CNW operated included the Ashland Limited, Duluth-Superior Limited, and the North Western Limited CNW eventually renamed the first 400 to the Twin Cities 400 as the CNW labeled almost all of its passenger trains with variations of the 400 moniker, including the Flambeau 400, Minnesota 400, Valley "400", Shoreland "400", Dakota 400 and the Kate Shelley 400. CNW ceased running the Twin Cities 400 in 1963, and all intercity passenger service on CNW ended with the formation of Amtrak in 1971.

Amtrak bought a dozen of C&NW's bilevel railcars and painted them with the Phase III paint used with Amtrak's EMD F40PH locomotives. They are no longer in use.

In conjunction with Union Pacific and Southern Pacific, the North Western operated some long distance passenger trains, including the Overland Limited, City of Los Angeles, City of San Francisco, City of Denver, and the Challenger. These services lasted from 1889 to 1955, after which the CNW route to Chicago was changed to the Milwaukee Road's due to poor track conditions.

Chicago and North Western also operated commuter train service in the Chicago area, where they developed what was perhaps the first control car. A modified gallery car was built in 1960 with locomotive controls to allow push-pull operation. which is preserved at the Illinois Railway Museum. The C&NW also pioneered the concept of Head End Power (HEP), generating 480 volt electricity from the locomotive to power the air conditioning, lighting, and heating on the new bi-level cars. This eventually became the standard for all railroads in the United States.

Three commuter lines radiated from North Western Station; the C&NW West Line to Geneva, Illinois; the C&NW Northwest Line to Harvard, Illinois; and the C&NW North Line to Kenosha, Wisconsin. At Crystal Lake Junction, some trains branched off to Williams Bay, Wisconsin. The West Line also had branches to St. Charles, Aurora, Freeport, and Crystal Lake. A fourth commuter line operated on the KD Line between Kenosha and Harvard until 1939.

In 1974, responsibility for the commuter lines and equipment ownership transferred to the newly formed Regional Transportation Authority, whose rail division was later branded in 1984 as Metra. The C&NW continued to run the lines under a "purchase of service" contract, in which the railroad maintained the right-of-way and operated trains on behalf of Metra.

All three C&NW commuter lines live on in the Metra system, with the Geneva line having been extended west to Elburn. However, service on the branch to Williams Bay was gradually cut back over the years, also resulting in changes to the name of the branch. In 1965, service was abandoned between Williams Bay and Lake Geneva. In 1975, service ended between Lake Geneva and Richmond. In 1981, service between McHenry and Richmond ended. Rails and ties north of the Cargill plant in Ringwood were removed during the 1980s, and the right of way converted to a trail. Service was discontinued to St. Charles in 1951. Service between Geneva and Aurora and Elgin and Crystal Lake was discontinued in the early 1930s. Service to Freeport ceased in the late 1940s. In 2023, Union Pacific decided to hand over the operation of Metra trains to the Metra system itself. The move was finalized in May 2025 with the intent to not be noticeable to riders, as both Metra and UP wanted to avoid major disruptions in the transition process. UP, however, will continue to own and maintain the ex-C&NW right of ways radiating from Chicago.

=== Short-lived steam program ===
By 1981, following the start of the early 1980s recession and the bankruptcy of the Milwaukee Road, public opinion on railroads around the Milwaukee area was beginning to sour. In response, management of the C&NW explored options to generate public awareness that the C&NW was still a healthy company. Manager of the railroad's Wisconsin Division, Chris Burger, pitched the idea of the railroad hosting a steam excursion program, using steam locomotive No. 1385 from the Mid-Continent Railway Museum. Because of the recession, C&NW President James R. Wolfe only approved a limited operation, instead of a full-blown program.

The steam tour took place in May 1982, dubbed the "Prosperity Special", to promote the C&NW's locomotive and rolling stock upgrades. As a result of the Prosperity Special's success, additional steam tours took place in the ensuing years throughout Wisconsin, Minnesota, Iowa, and Illinois. Some of the trains used C&NW track rights to travel over Milwaukee Road and Burlington Northern trackage. The final steam tour took place in 1987, during the centennial of the City of Chicago. By which time, there was an insurance crisis within the railroad industry. The railroad's management had also changed, and enthusiasm on the C&NW to operate steam tours was lost.

== Additional notes ==
=== Operations ===
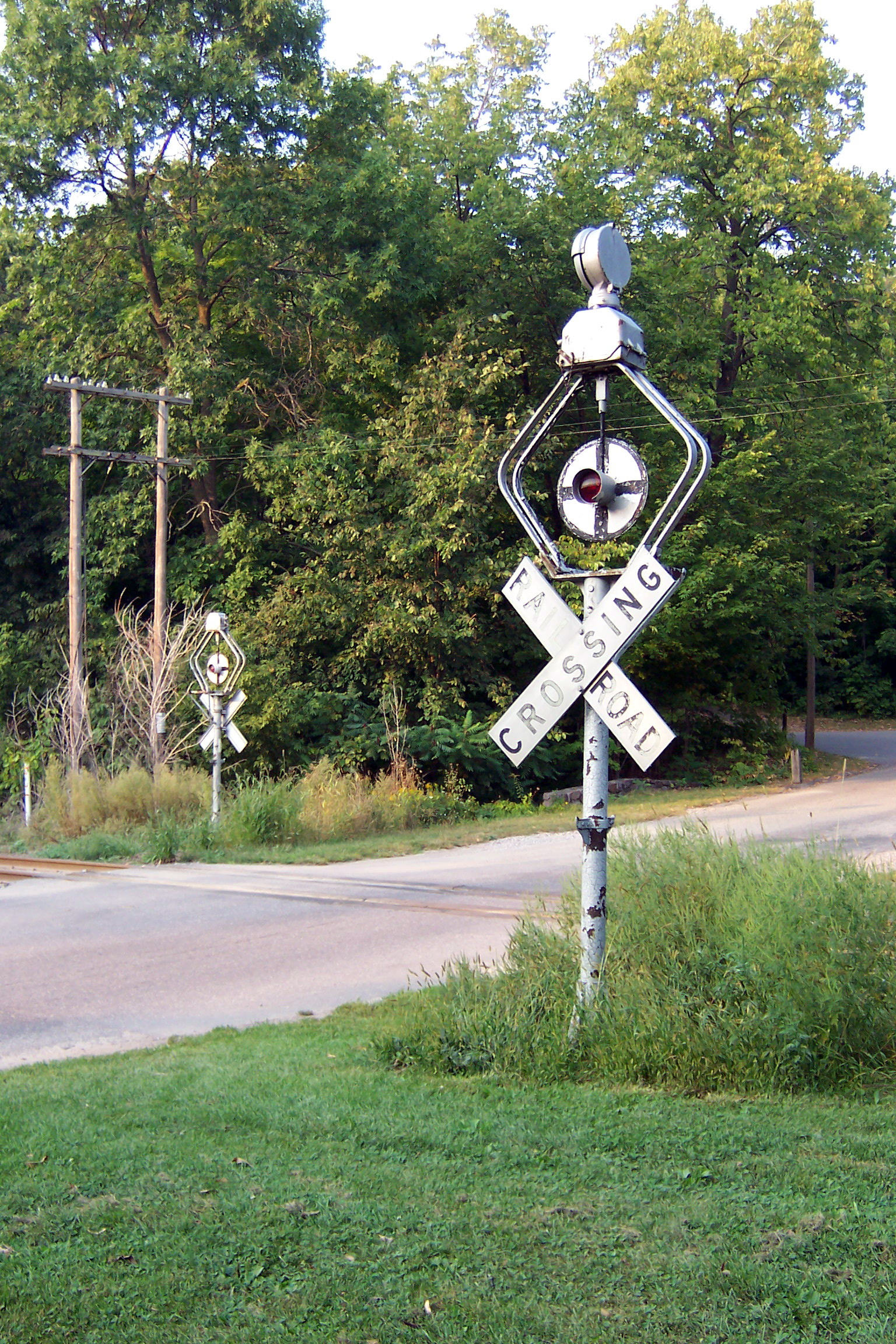
A set of WRRS center harp wigwag signals commonly seen on the C&NW during the 20th Century

The CNW was known for running on the left-hand side when running on double track mainlines. In the United States, most railroads used the right-hand track along double-track mainlines, while left-hand running was more common in countries where British companies built the railroads. According to a display in Metra's Lake Forest station, the reason for this was a combination of chance and inertia. When originally built as single-line trackage, the C&NW arbitrarily placed its stations on the left-hand side of the tracks (when headed inbound toward Chicago). Later, when a second track was added, it was placed on the side away from the stations so as not to force them to relocate. Since most passengers waiting at the stations were headed toward Chicago, the inbound track remained the one closest to the station platforms. The expense of reconfiguring signals and switches has prevented a conversion to right-hand operation ever since.

The Chicago and North Western was known for its installation of Western Railroad Supply Company wigwag signals at many of its crossing in the 1920–1940s. Almost every town on their route had at least the main crossing in town protected by them. The most common style were the Center Harp shorties. They were almost iconic to the CNW. Many of them, which were grandfathered in after the Federal Railroad Administration ruled them inadequate protection in 1949, survived until the 1970s and a few remain on lines in Wisconsin that have been sold off to other railroads. Lack of available parts and upgrades to roads have replaced all but a few of them.

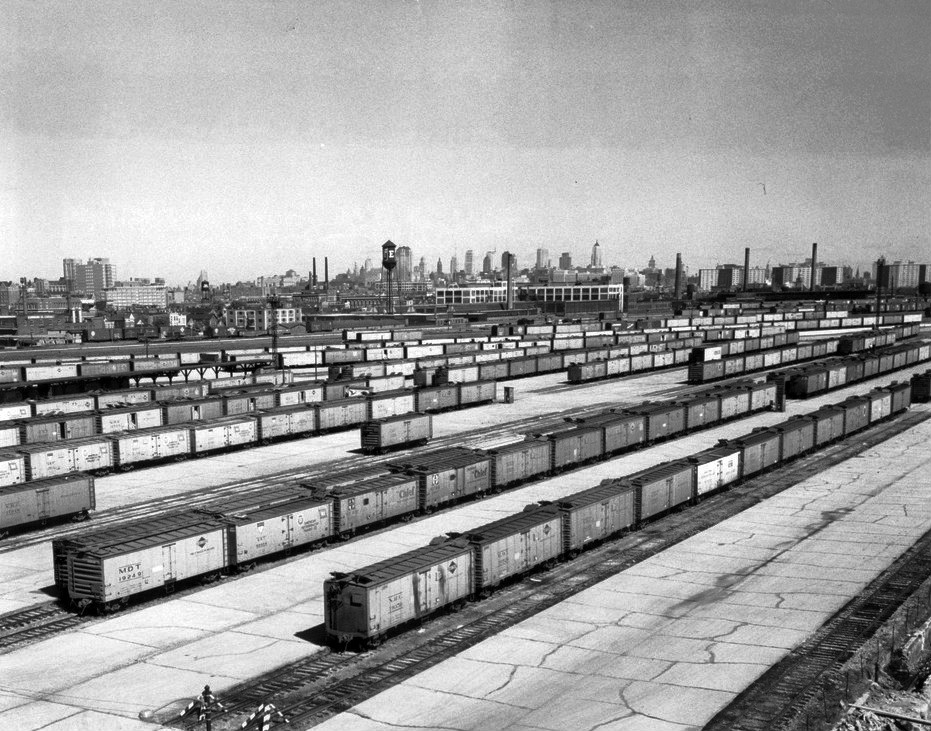
The Wood Street "potato yard" in 1959 with boxcars filled with potatoes

The railroad operated what was once the largest "potato yard" or potato market, at its Chicago Wood Street yards. Potatoes came to the yard from every point in the United States to be bought or traded by produce dealers and brokers. While the facility came to be known as the "potato yard", it was also a site where other vegetables could be bought, sold or traded.

=== Logo ===
In 1891, the CNW adopted the famous "ball and bar" logo, which survived a few modifications throughout its 104-year existence. This included the changing of text:

- The North Western Line (1891–1902)
- Chicago & North Western Line (1902–1944)
- Chicago & North Western System (1944–1957)
- Chicago & North Western Railway (1957–1971)
- North Western: Employee Owned (1971–1982)
- Chicago & North Western System (1982–1995)

=== Reused rolling stock ===
The railroad also purchased a great deal of its equipment second-hand. CNW shop forces economized wherever possible, earning the railroad the nickname "Cheap and Nothing Wasted". Sometimes employees referred to the condition of equipment as "Cardboard and No Wheels".

=== Rail trails ===
One of the first rail trails created in the United States was the 32.5-mile (52.3 km) Elroy-Sparta State Trail in Wisconsin, which used a segment abandoned in 1965.

The 400 State Trail runs from Reedsburg to Elroy on the former main line.

The Cannonball Bike Path runs on a 5-mile stretch in Madison, Wisconsin on the old "Ridgerunner line". It connects with the Military Ridge State Trail in Fitchburg at a roundabout with the Capital City State Trail, which is not a rail trail. The former Illinois Central line, now the Badger State Trail, runs on a bridge directly above the roundabout and has ramps connecting to the Capital City and Cannonball Paths. This area is known as the "Velo Underround".

The Cowboy Trail is a rail trail that follows the abandoned CNW line between Chadron, Nebraska, and Norfolk, Nebraska. When completed, it will be 321 miles in length.

The Glacial River Trail is a rail trail that follows the abandoned CNW line between Milton, Wisconsin, and Fort Atkinson, Wisconsin.

The Military Ridge State Trail runs from Fitchburg to Dodgeville on the former "Ridgerunner" line. It connects with the Cannonball Bike Path in Fitchburg.

The Peace Trail runs along the former C&NW line between Janesville, Wisconsin, and Beloit, Wisconsin, next to the existing ex-Milwaukee Road line.

The Sangamon Valley Trail is another rail trail, currently 5.5-mile (8.9 km) in length, on the west side of Sangamon County in Illinois, which skirts Springfield, Illinois. It is a segment of a former St. Louis, Peoria and North Western Railway 38-mile (61.2 km) right-of-way (which was later folded into the CNW) that has been set aside for rail trail use. The entire right-of-way connects Girard, Illinois, on the south end, to Athens, Illinois, at the north end. The right-of-way spans the western half of Sangamon County in a north–south direction, and also traverses small sections of Macoupin County and Menard County.

The Three Eagles Trail runs for a couple miles south of Eagle River, Wisconsin.

The Wild Rivers Trail is a 104-mile-long rail trail that follows the abandoned CNW line between Rice Lake, Wisconsin, and Superior, Wisconsin.

The Great Western Trail of 17 miles follows the abandoned Chicago Great Western Railroad from Forest Park to St. Charles.

The Glacial Drumlin State Trail of 52 miles follows the abandoned CNW line between Madison, Wisconsin, and Milwaukee, Wisconsin.

The Three Rivers Trail Trailhead is located 2 miles west of Eagle Grove, Iowa, extending west 33 miles to Rolfe, Iowa. It is a crushed limestone trail that has been developed over the abandoned railroad right-of-way. The trail also features a number of rest areas in Thor, Dakota City, Bradgate, and Rutland. The trail crosses the Boone River west of Eagle Grove. It is a Deck Plate Girder and Trestle that is 280 Feet Total, 80 Foot Main Spans.

== Notable employees ==
- Silas B. Cobb, Chicago industrialist and philanthropist, former member of C&NW board of directors
- Clarence Darrow, attorney and former Chief Counsel for the C&NW
- Albert Hammond, Wisconsin State Assemblyman
- Fred H. Hildebrandt, U.S. Congressman from South Dakota
- Charles Ingalls, De Smet, South Dakota (1879–1880); father of Laura Ingalls Wilder
- Carl Ingold Jacobson, Los Angeles, California; City Council member, 1925–1933
- William B. Ogden, the first mayor of Chicago
- Marvin Hughitt, the first president of the Chicago and North Western
- Merritt Clarke Ring, Neillsville, Wisconsin; lawyer and politician
- Abe Saperstein, founder of the Harlem Globetrotters
- Kate Shelley, heroine
- Perry H. Smith, Chicago, Illinois, politician and businessman
- George Gilbert Swain, Delton, Wisconsin, politician

== Preserved rolling stock ==
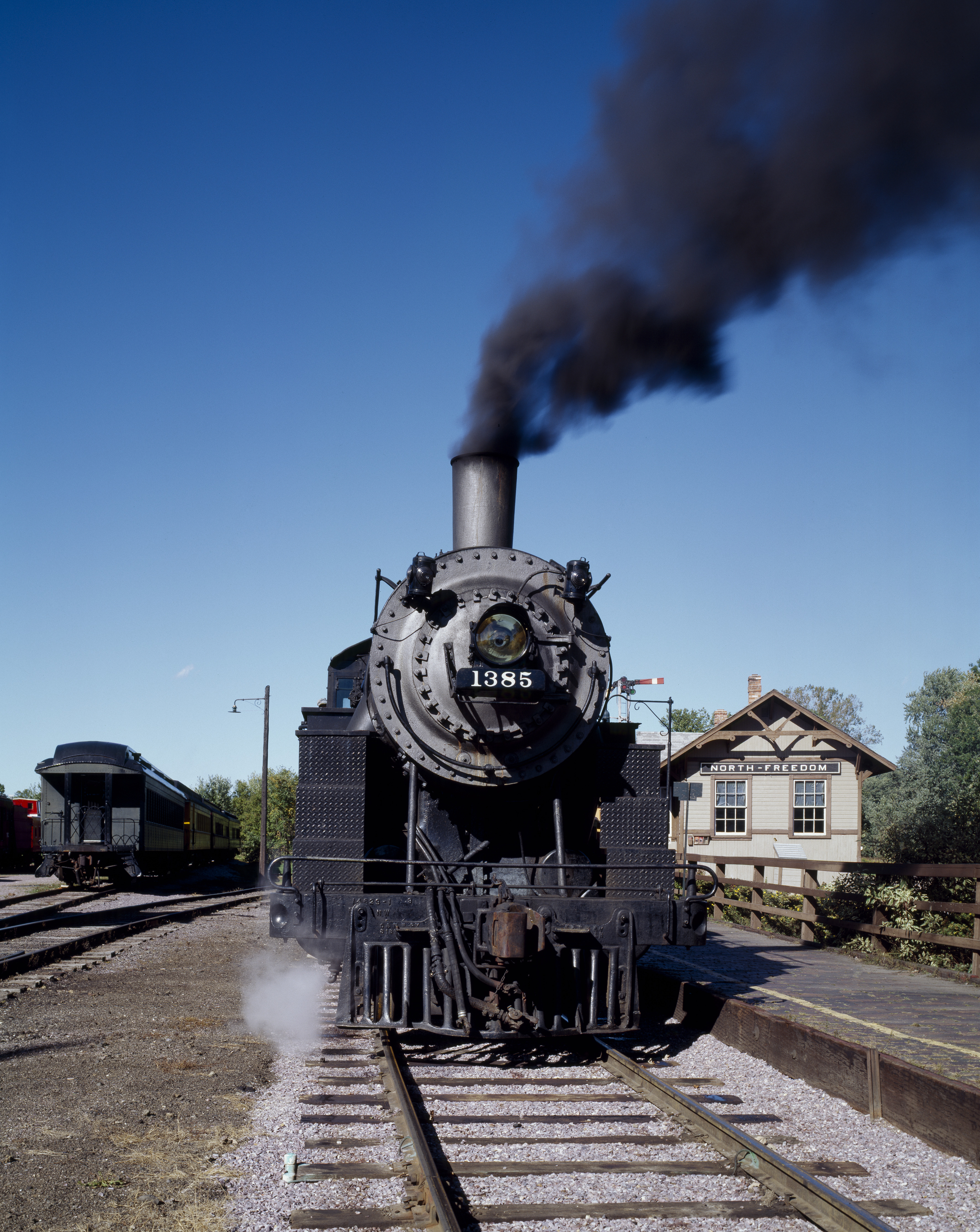
One surviving C&NW steam locomotive, 4-6-0 No. 1385, idling at the Mid-Continent Railway Museum in North Freedom, Wisconsin, sometime in the 1990s

There are many Chicago and North Western locomotives still in revenue service with other railroads, such as the Union Pacific Railroad. Some of the older locomotives have been donated to parks and museums for preservation, and a few continue to operate on scenic or tourist railroads. Most of the engines in use with Union Pacific have been repainted. A small few are still "patched", where the C&NW logos on the sides are replaced by a Union Pacific shield, and new numbers are applied over the old numbers with a Union Pacific sticker.

=== Steam locomotives ===
- Pioneer (4-2-0), on static display inside the Chicago History Museum
- No. 274 (4-4-0), on static display at the National Museum of Transportation in St. Louis, Missouri
- No. 1015 (Class D, 4-4-2), on static display at the National Museum of Transportation in St. Louis, Missouri
- No. 444 (Class R-1, 4-6-0), on static display at the Forney Transportation Museum in Denver, Colorado
- No. 1385 (Class R-1, 4–6–0), undergoing restoration at the Mid-Continent Railway Museum in North Freedom, Wisconsin
- No. 175 (Class R-1, 4–6–0), undergoing restoration at the Steam Railroading Institute in Owosso, Michigan
- No. 279 (3 ft gauge, 2-6-0), on static display at Pioche Town Park in Pioche, Nevada
- No. 100 (2 ft gauge, 0-4-0 t), stored under private ownership in Watertown, New York

=== Diesel locomotives ===
- No. 411 (EMD F7A), operational at the Illinois Railway Museum in Union, Illinois. Restored to CNW livery. Originally CNW 4082C.
- Metra No. 308 (EMD F7A), operational at the Illinois Railway Museum in Union, Illinois. Still in Metra livery. Originally CNW 4083C, and later CNW No. 414
- No. 515 (EMD E8A), operational at the Illinois Railway Museum. Still in Iowa Pacific livery. Originally CNW 5029B.
- No. 1518 (EMD GP7), operational at the Illinois Railway Museum. First EMD General Purpose series diesel ever built. Rebuilt to CNW 4311, restored with high short hood and original CNW number.
- No. 1689 (ALCO RSD5), operational at the Illinois Railway Museum
- No. 4160 (as RI #4506) (EMD GP7R), operational at the Illinois Railway Museum. Originally CRIP 1266, rebuilt to CNW 4160 then restored to Rock Island livery.
- No. 6847 (EMD SD40-2), operational at the Illinois Railway Museum
- No. 7009 (EMD SD50), operational at the Illinois Railway Museum. First SD50 to be preserved

=== Passenger coaches ===
- No. 440 (Pullman business car) at the Mid-Continent Railway Museum.
- No. 7409 (Pullman combination car) at the Mid-Continent Railway Museum.
- No. 7721 (Commuter Combine) at the Oklahoma Railway Museum in Oklahoma City, Oklahoma.
- A set of Bi-Level passenger coaches are at the Lake Superior Railroad Museum in Duluth, Minnesota.
- Several Bi-Level commuter coaches as well as several long-distance passenger and support cars are at the Illinois Railway Museum in Union, Illinois.

== Chicago and North Western Historical Society ==
The Chicago and North Western Historical Society was organized by a number of railfans in 1973. The Society's purpose is to preserve the history and memory of the Chicago and North Western Railway through the publication of a quarterly magazine, the preservation of railroad paraphernalia, and an Annual Meet. The Society's journal, North Western Lines, is published four times a year.

== See also ==
- Southern Pacific Transportation Company
- Chicago, Burlington and Quincy Railroad
- Illinois and Midland Railroad
- Milwaukee Road
- Nickel Plate Road
