= Justice DeWolf =

Justice DeWolf may refer to:

- Stephen DeWolf (1833–1907), justice of the Montana Territorial Supreme Court
- John DeWolf (judge) (1760–1841), justice of the Rhode Island Supreme Court
