= Sangamon Valley Trail =

Rail trail in the U.S. state of Illinois

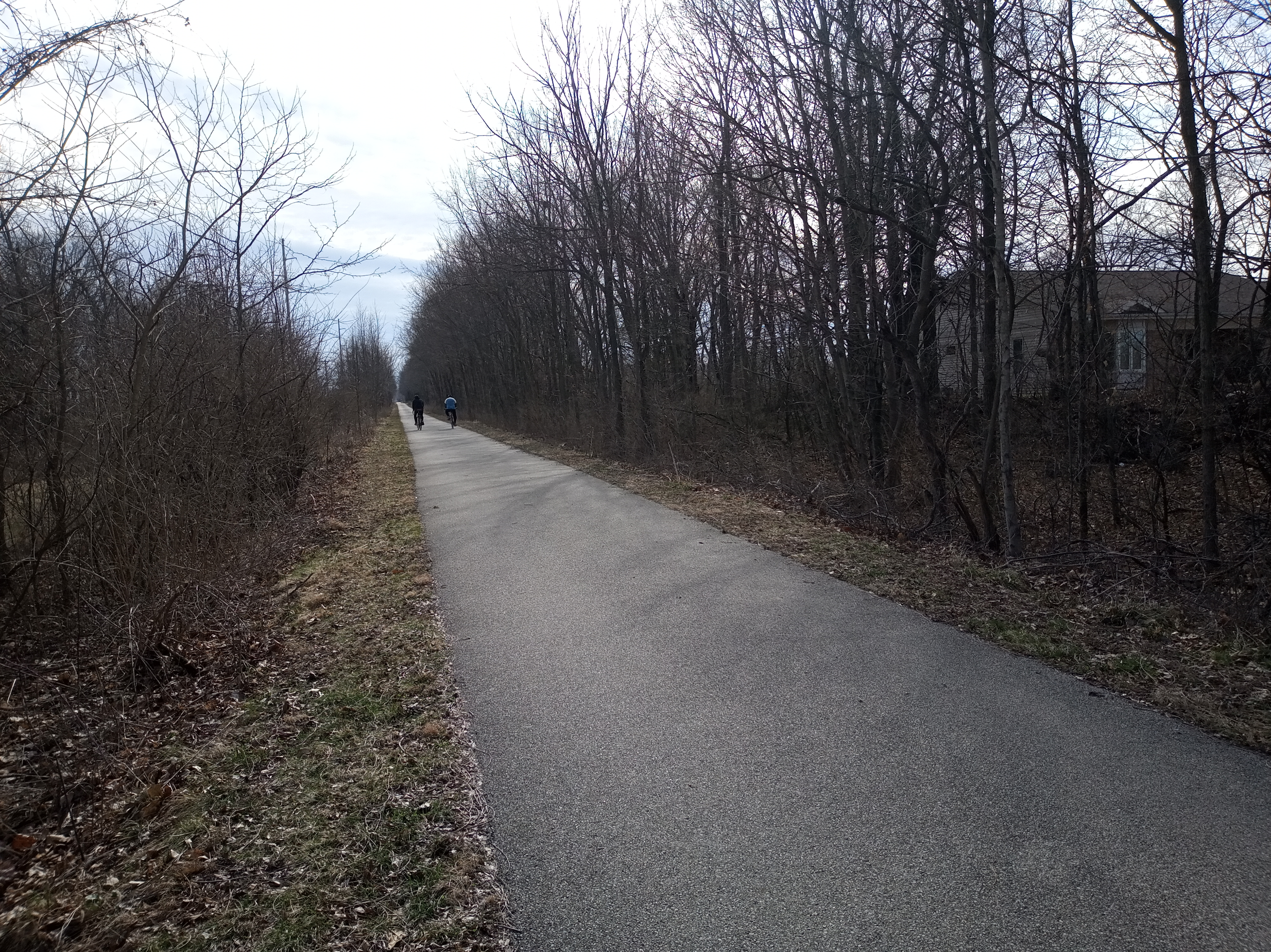
- Sangamon Valley Trail near Lewis Park
- Length: 13.5 mi (21.7 km)
- Location: Sangamon County, Illinois, United States; Menard County, Illinois
- Established: July 26, 2011
- Began construction: 2010
- Completed: 2025; 1 year ago
- Trailheads: Springfield, Illinois (39°45′23.7″N 89°45′56.5″W); Athens, Illinois

The Sangamon Valley Trail is an 13.5-mile (21.7 km) rail trail on the west side of Sangamon County and the southeastern corner of Menard County in the U.S. state of Illinois. Skirting Springfield, Illinois, it extends from Centennial Park, on Springfield's southwest side (39°45′23.4″N 89°45′37.6″W), to a location within Menard County near the municipality of Athens. It was constructed by a Sangamon County team in three stages; the 5.5-mile-long first or southern stage was completed in 2010–2011 at a cost of $3.8 million, and opened to the public on July 26, 2011. The 6-mile-long second section of the trail was completed in 2016-2017 at a cost of $4.4 million, and opened to the public on November 16, 2017. The 2-mile-long third section, and northernmost extension, of the trail was completed in 2025 and opened to the public on October 6, 2025. The trail is operated by the Springfield Park District.

== Description ==
=== Right-of-way ===
The Sangamon Valley Trail's 38-mile (61.2 km) right-of-way has been set aside for rail trail use. It occupies an abandoned segment of the St. Louis, Peoria and North Western Railway, later consolidated into the Chicago and North Western Railroad. The primary metropolitan area served is the greater Springfield, Illinois metropolitan area. The entire right-of-way connects Girard, Illinois, on the south end, to Athens, Illinois, at the north end. The right-of-way spans the western half of Sangamon County in a north-south direction, and also traverses small sections of Macoupin County and Menard County. Population in the trail's service area in western Sangamon County is growing as of 2025.

=== Trail expansions ===
Extensions of the trail were constructed in 2017 and in 2025. In the first extgension, the additional 6-mile (9.7 km) of trail, which extended northward from the trail's former Stuart Park trailhead, connects Stuart Park with Fancy Creek Township near Cantrall, Illinois. The extension of the trail to a northern trailhead at Irwin Bridge Road enabled the recreational pathway to cross the Sangamon River, the river that provided the trail with its name. An additional two-mile segment, lengthening the Sangamon Valley Trail from 11.5 miles in length to 13.5 miles, officially opened in October 2025. The additional two-mile segment, opened in October 2025, extended the trail into Menard County, Illinois, with a northern end adjacent to the municipality of Athens, Illinois. Local leaders look forward to further lengthening of trail-accessible pavement on unused sections of the acquired right-of-way. These extensions could lengthen the trail into portions of Macoupin County, and into further portions of Menard County.
