= Chester Deming Long =

American politician

Chester Deming Long (1819-1884) was a member of the Wisconsin State Assembly.

== Biography ==
Long was born on February 15, 1819, in Pembroke, New York. He moved to Darien, Wisconsin Territory in 1839. On November 1, 1843, Long married Laura Ann Lee. They would have five children. He died on June 15, 1884.

== Career ==
Long was elected to the Assembly in 1860. Previously, he was a register of deeds from 1851 to 1852.
