= Luke Drury (judge) =

American judge

Luke Drury (fl. 1820s–1830s) was a justice of the Rhode Island Supreme Court from June 1822 to May 1824.

Born in Bristol, Rhode Island, Drury was the son of Dr. John Drury, and the grandson of Revolutionary War hero, Colonel Luke Drury. Drury graduated from Brown University in 1813. In 1822, he published a geographical work titled New Geography. He was appointed Collector of the Port of Bristol in 1824, but dismissed from that position in 1827, as recounted by John Quincy Adams, "for delinquency long continued, and increasing, after repeated warnings". Adams recounted that Drury had obtained the post through the political influence of Senator James D'Wolf, over a better candidate, and that Drury, in a meeting with Adams, "acknowledged and deeply lamented his delinquency", and pleaded with Adams for assistance in extending the time "to recover the monies due from him as Collector". Adams declined to assist Drury, instead directing him to write a letter to the Secretary of the Treasury.

In 1833, Drury wrote the first account of the murder trial of Ephraim Kingsbury Avery titled A report of the examination of Rev. Ephraim K. Avery, for the murder of Sarah Maria Cornell. The account "was seen by many as an attempt. to disguise the inadequacy of justices Howe and Haile's decision by distorting the testimony given" at one of the proceedings in the trial, and several contradictory accounts were written in response.

Drury married Lydia Potter De Wolf, with whom he had two sons, one of whom died in infancy; after Lydia's death, he remarried, and had three daughters with his second wife.

Political offices
Preceded by John DeWolf	Justice of the Rhode Island Supreme Court; 1822–1824	Succeeded by Samuel Randall
