= Col. Matthew Rogers Building =

- U.S. National Register of Historic Places
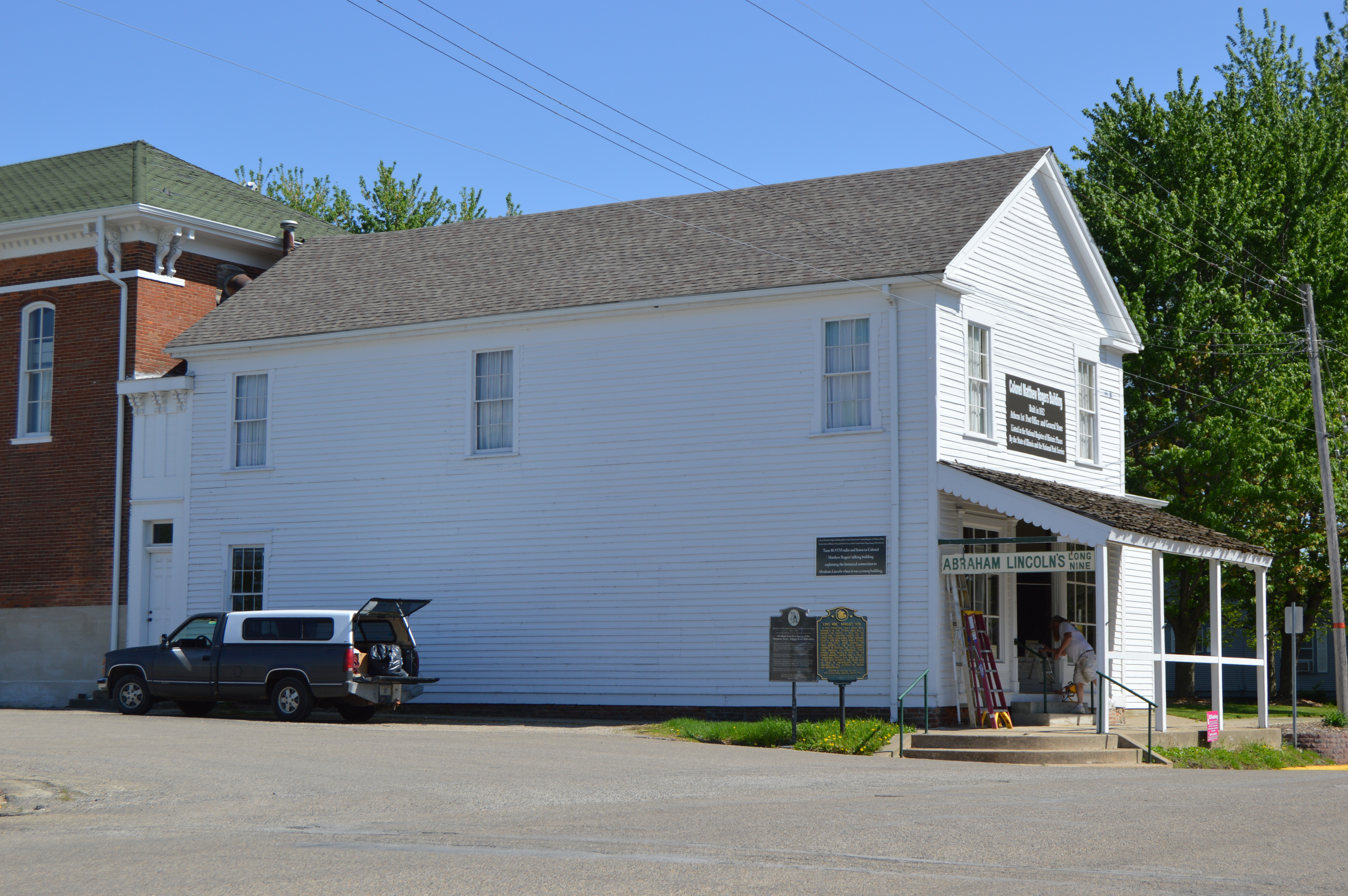
- Northern side and front

- Location within Illinois Location within the United States
- Location: 200 S. Main St., Athens, Illinois
- Coordinates: 39°57′36″N 89°43′26″W
- Area: less than one acre
- Built: 1832
- Architectural style: Greek Revival
- NRHP reference No.: 05000431
- Added to NRHP: May 22, 2005

The Col. Matthew Rogers Building, also known as the Abraham Lincoln Long Nine Museum, is a historic building located at 200 S. Main St. in Athens, Illinois. The building was constructed circa 1832 by Colonel Matthew Rogers, who ran a store in the building. As Rogers was also postmaster of Athens, he moved the city's post office to his store. Abraham Lincoln, who was postmaster of New Salem at the time, frequently visited the post office during the 1830s to fetch mail. Josiah Francis purchased the store on a mortgage from Rogers in 1837. In the same year, Athens held a banquet in the building to honor Lincoln and eight other Illinois legislators for moving the state capital to Springfield; the nine men were known as the "Long Nine", as they were all over 6 feet (1.8 m) tall. When Rogers sued Francis for failing to keep up with his mortgage payments in 1840, Lincoln again became involved with the store, as his firm represented Rogers in court; Rogers won the case by default. After Rogers died in 1848, the building continued to be used as a store. The building is now a museum documenting Lincoln and the Long Nine's history and connection to the building.

The building was added to the National Register of Historic Places on May 22, 2005.
