= Darien, Wisconsin =

- Village
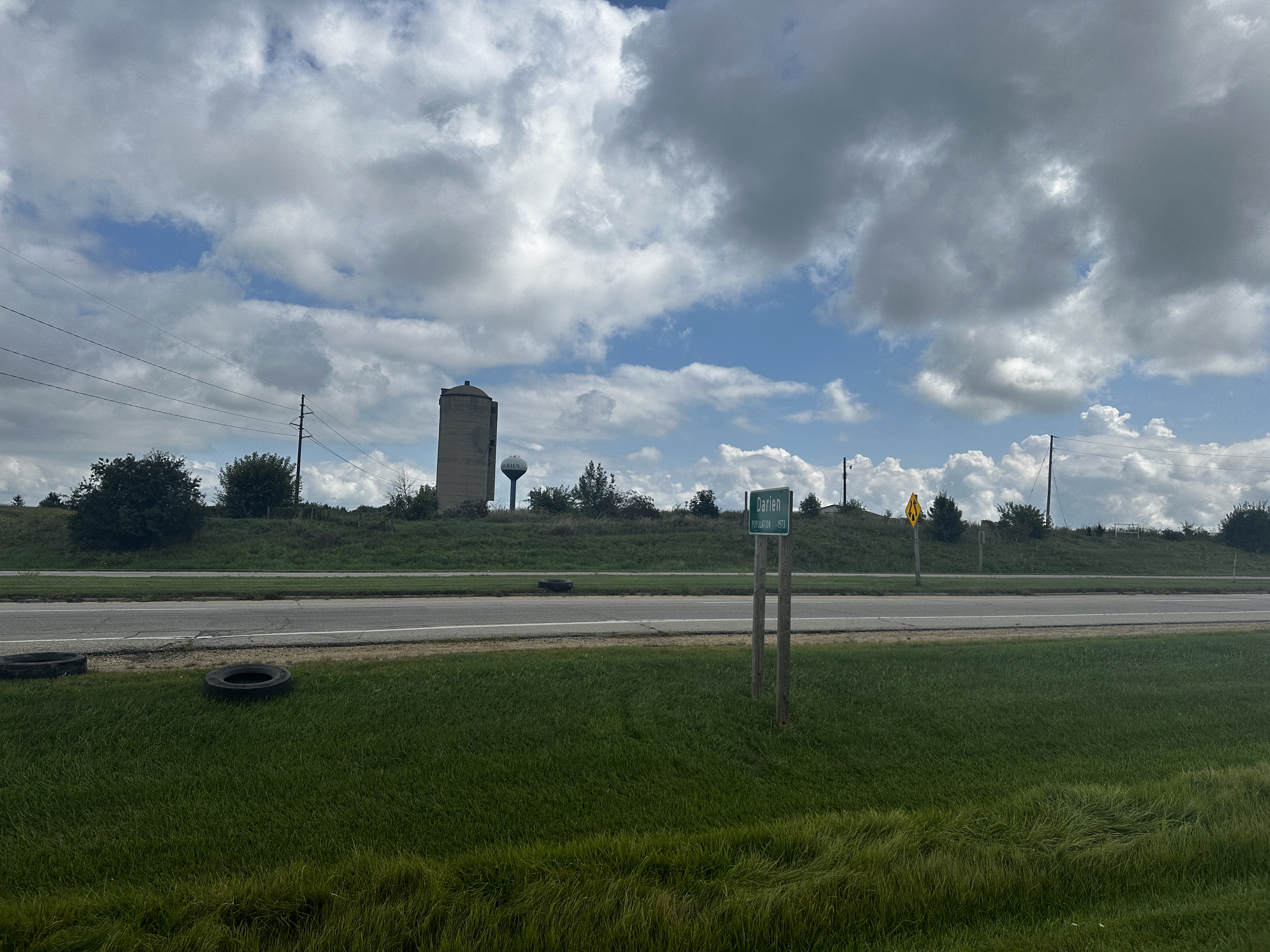
- The Darien sign and water tower as seen from U.S. Highway 14/North Walworth Street in August 2024.

- Location of Darien in Walworth County, Wisconsin.
- Coordinates: 42°36′54″N 88°43′14″W
- Country: United States
- State: Wisconsin
- County: Walworth

Area
  - Total: 1.29 sq mi (3.34 km^{2})
  - Land: 1.29 sq mi (3.34 km^{2})
  - Water: 0 sq mi (0.00 km^{2})
- Elevation: 925 ft (282 m)

Population (2020)
  - Total: 1,573
  - Density: 1,232.0/sq mi (475.66/km^{2})
- Time zone: UTC-6 (Central (CST))
  - Summer (DST): UTC-5 (CDT)
- ZIP Code: 53113, 53114
- Area code: 262
- FIPS code: 55-18850
- GNIS feature ID: 1583050
- Website: Village of Darien

Darien (/dɛəriˈɛn/ or /dɛəriˈæn/) is a village in Walworth County, Wisconsin, United States. The population was 1,573 at the 2020 census. The village is located within the Town of Darien.

== Geography ==
Darien is located at 42°36′2″N 88°42′30″W (42.600732, -88.708391).

According to the United States Census Bureau, the village has a total area of 1.29 square miles (3.34 km^{2}), all land.

== Demographics ==
Historical population
Census	Pop.	Note	%±
1880	427		—
1890	354		−17.1%
1960	805		—
1970	839		4.2%
1980	1,152		37.3%
1990	1,158		0.5%
2000	1,572		35.8%
2010	1,580		0.5%
2020	1,573		−0.4%
U.S. Decennial Census

=== 2010 census ===
As of the census of 2010, there were 1,580 people, 549 households, and 419 families living in the village. The population density was 1,224.8 inhabitants per square mile (472.9/km^{2}). There were 611 housing units at an average density of 473.6 per square mile (182.9/km^{2}). The racial makeup of the village was 86.0% White, 0.8% African American, 0.4% Native American, 0.6% Asian, 10.8% from other races, and 1.5% from two or more races. Hispanic or Latino of any race were 22.0% of the population.

There were 549 households, of which 40.6% had children under the age of 18 living with them, 56.5% were married couples living together, 13.7% had a female householder with no husband present, 6.2% had a male householder with no wife present, and 23.7% were non-families. 16.4% of all households were made up of individuals, and 4.6% had someone living alone who was 65 years of age or older. The average household size was 2.88 and the average family size was 3.21.

The median age in the village was 33.5 years. 28.9% of residents were under the age of 18; 8.8% were between the ages of 18 and 24; 28.5% were from 25 to 44; 25.5% were from 45 to 64; and 8.2% were 65 years of age or older. The gender makeup of the village was 50.2% male and 49.8% female.

=== 2000 census ===
As of the census of 2000, there were 1,572 people, 537 households, and 411 families living in the village. The population density was 1,225.0 people per square mile (474.2/km^{2}). There were 560 housing units at an average density of 436.4 per square mile (168.9/km^{2}). The racial makeup of the village was 93.13% White, 0.51% Black or African American, 0.25% Native American, 0.06% Pacific Islander, 4.39% from other races, and 1.65% from two or more races. 14.12% of the population were Hispanic or Latino of any race.

There were 537 households, out of which 42.6% had children under the age of 18 living with them, 59.8% were married couples living together, 10.8% had a female householder with no husband present, and 23.3% were non-families. 18.8% of all households were made up of individuals, and 6.1% had someone living alone who was 65 years of age or older. The average household size was 2.92 and the average family size was 3.35.

In the village, the population was spread out, with 32.6% under the age of 18, 9.2% from 18 to 24, 31.0% from 25 to 44, 20.2% from 45 to 64, and 6.9% who were 65 years of age or older. The median age was 31 years. For every 100 females, there were 102.3 males. For every 100 females age 18 and over, there were 100.2 males.

The median income for a household in the village was $46,800, and the median income for a family was $53,625. Males had a median income of $35,568 versus $25,278 for females. The per capita income for the village was $17,638. About 4.9% of families and 6.8% of the population were below the poverty line, including 6.4% of those under age 18 and 6.7% of those age 65 or over.

== Transportation ==
Darien was a stop on the Racine & Southwestern branch line of the Chicago, Milwaukee, St. Paul and Pacific Railroad, better known as the Milwaukee Road. In its 1980 bankruptcy, the Milwaukee Road disposed of the Southwestern Line. The Wisconsin & Southern continues to service Darien from a connection at Bardwell to the west.

== Notable people ==
- John DeWolf, legislator
- John Jeffers, legislator
- Chester Deming Long, legislator
- Joseph Seaver, farmer and legislator
