= St. Louis, Peoria and North Western Railway =

The St. Louis, Peoria and North Western Railway was a short-lived and nominally independent railroad of 114.6 miles in length. It extended from near Benld, Illinois, its southern end, to Peoria, Illinois at its northern end. It was constructed in 1911–1913 with $10.0 million in capital raised by the Chicago and North Western Railway (C & NW) to haul coal from Macoupin County mines operated by the Superior Coal Company, a wholly owned subsidiary of the Chicago and Northwestern.

== History ==
Apparently for legal purposes, the Benld-Peoria railroad project was incorporated in 1911 as an independent railroad. It was, however, always an adjunct of the Chicago and North Western; and in December 1913, when the St. Louis, Peoria, and North Western was completed, the branch line was consolidated into the C & NW. The new branch line entered service in 1914. After the consolidation of the former St. Louis, Peoria and North Western into the C & NW, the branch line was further extended southward to Worden, Illinois.

The St. Louis, Peoria and North Western was not built as a passenger line and deliberately avoided population centers located on or close to its right-of-way. For example, the railroad's right-of-way never approached closer than 3.5 miles to the city center of Springfield, Illinois, and did not provide passenger service to Springfield.

The six Macoupin coal mines served by the St. Louis, Peoria and North Western yielded an estimated 2.0 million tons of coal annually, almost all of which was burned by the Chicago and North Western in its steam railway operations. The C & NW's Corn Belt trunk lines did not serve any coal fields, and until 1914, the Chicago-based railroad had been forced to purchase much of its coal from outside suppliers. The development of the St. Louis, Peoria and North Western branch line was meant to create an in-house pipeline of coal supply for the C & NW's overall operations.

The dieselization of the Chicago and North Western reduced the Chicago-based railroad's need for an in-house coal supply. Passage, starting in 1963, of the Clean Air Acts made Macoupin County coal redundant. Coal haulage declined on the Girard-Peoria line, and the branch line went out of use in the 1990s.

== Current events ==
That section of the roadbed located in Sangamon County, Illinois has been rededicated to rails-to-trails use. In July 2011, part of the right-of-way was reopened as the Sangamon Valley Trail.

One of the abandoned Superior Coal Company Macoupin County coal mines operated by the Chicago and Northwestern as part of its St. Louis, Peoria and North Western operations has apparently caused mine subsidence, which caused severe damage in 2009 to an elementary school in Benld. The school district was forced to tear down the building and rebuild elsewhere. In August 2010, the Gillespie school district sued the Union Pacific, the corporate successor of the C & NW, for $22 million in damages. Almost $10 million was awarded in settlement of the lawsuit. The mine subsidence has expanded to affect private houses adjacent to the school property.
