= Thomas Gillespie (Wisconsin politician) =

American politician

Thomas Gillespie (January 15, 1831 – November 18, 1914) was a member of the Wisconsin State Assembly.

== Biography ==
Gillespie was born on January 15, 1831, in Wigtown, Scotland; sources have differed on the exact location. He married Martha B. Simpson (1836–1920) in 1854, and they had ten children. He died on November 18, 1914, in what was then Kilbourn City, Wisconsin.

== Career ==
Gillespie was a member of the Assembly during the 1880 and 1881 sessions. He was a Republican.
