= John DeWolf (politician) =

American politician

John DeWolf (June 7, 1817 – September 7, 1895) was a member of the Wisconsin State Assembly.

== Biography ==
DeWolf was born on June 7, 1817. In 1838, he married Susan Emeline. They had two children and moved to Darien, Wisconsin from Otsego County, New York in 1854. DeWolf died on September 7, 1895.

== Career ==
DeWolf was a member of the Assembly in 1860. Additionally, he was a Walworth County, Wisconsin Supervisor. He was a Republican.
