= George Gilbert Swain =

American politician

George Gilbert Swain (January 3, 1829 – June 1, 1918) was an American businessman and politician.

Born in Halifax, Vermont, Swain moved to Delton, Wisconsin in 1855 and settled on a farm. He then worked for the Chicago and North Western Railway and was an inspector for the railroad company's fuel supplies and mines in Iowa. Swain served on the Delton Town Board and on the Sauk County, Wisconsin Board of Supervisors. Swain was a Republican and was one of the presidential electors in the 1872 United States Presidential Election. While living in Sauk County, Swain served in the Wisconsin State Assembly in 1870, 1871, and 1872. After retiring, Swain moved to Winona, Minnesota. When his wife died in 1911, Swain moved to La Crosse, Wisconsin where he died. Swain was buried in Winona, Minnesota.
