= Athens, Illinois =

- City
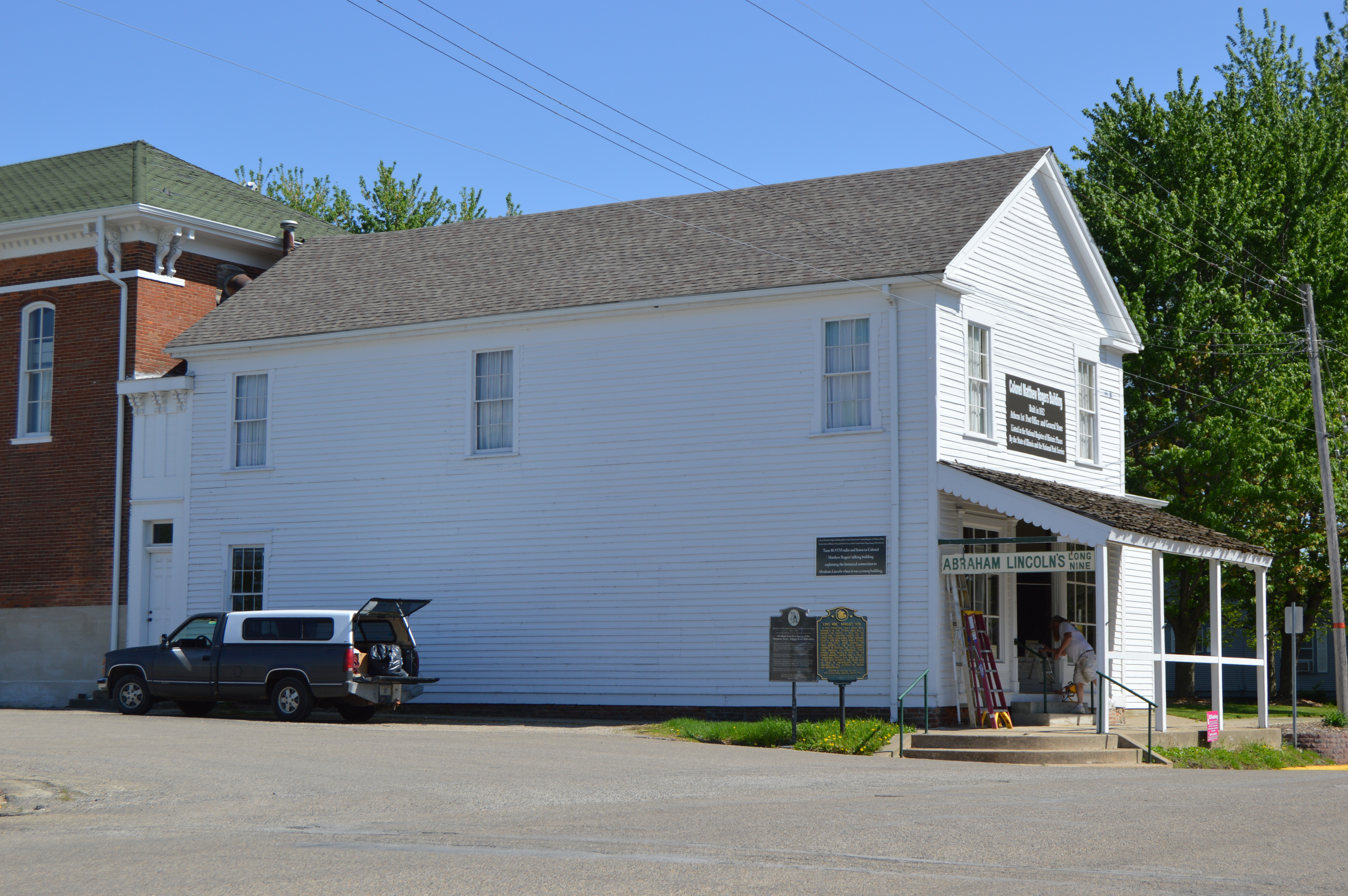
- The Col. Matthew Rogers Building in Athens, May 2014

- Location in Menard County, Illinois
- Coordinates: 39°57′43″N 89°43′18″W
- Country: United States
- State: Illinois
- County: Menard

Area
  - Total: 1.68 sq mi (4.36 km^{2})
  - Land: 1.68 sq mi (4.36 km^{2})
  - Water: 0 sq mi (0.00 km^{2})
- Elevation: 600 ft (180 m)

Population (2020)
  - Total: 1,977
  - Density: 1,174.0/sq mi (453.27/km^{2})
- Time zone: UTC-6 (CST)
  - Summer (DST): UTC-5 (CDT)
- ZIP code: 62613
- Area code(s): 217, 447
- FIPS code: 17-02674
- GNIS feature ID: 2394010
- Website: www.athensil.com

Athens (/ˈeɪθənz/ AY-thənz) is a city in Menard County, Illinois, United States. The population was 1,977 at the 2020 census. It is part of the Springfield, Illinois Metropolitan Statistical Area.

== Geography ==
Athens is in southeastern Menard County, 9 miles (14 km) southeast of Petersburg, the county seat. Illinois Routes 29 and 123 pass together through the northeast side of the city. IL 29 leads south 14 miles (23 km) to Springfield, the state capital, and north 18 miles (29 km) to Mason City, while IL 123 leads east 8 miles (13 km) to Williamsville and northwest to Petersburg.

According to the U.S. Census Bureau, the city of Athens has an area of 1.68 square miles (4.4 km^{2}), all land. Town Branch flows westward across the southwest corner of the city, leading 2 miles (3 km) to the Sangamon River, part of the Illinois River watershed.

== Demographics ==
Historical population
| Census | Pop. | Note | %± |
|---|---|---|---|
| 1860 | 392 | | — |
| 1870 | 351 | | −10.5% |
| 1880 | 410 | | 16.8% |
| 1890 | 944 | | 130.2% |
| 1900 | 1,535 | | 62.6% |
| 1910 | 1,340 | | −12.7% |
| 1920 | 1,241 | | −7.4% |
| 1930 | 1,019 | | −17.9% |
| 1940 | 1,062 | | 4.2% |
| 1950 | 1,048 | | −1.3% |
| 1960 | 1,035 | | −1.2% |
| 1970 | 1,158 | | 11.9% |
| 1980 | 1,371 | | 18.4% |
| 1990 | 1,404 | | 2.4% |
| 2000 | 1,726 | | 22.9% |
| 2010 | 1,988 | | 15.2% |
| 2020 | 1,977 | | −0.6% |
U.S. Decennial Census

=== 2020 census ===
As of the 2020 census, Athens had a population of 1,977. The median age was 37.1 years. 28.0% of residents were under the age of 18 and 14.3% of residents were 65 years of age or older. For every 100 females there were 88.1 males, and for every 100 females age 18 and over there were 84.6 males age 18 and over.

0.0% of residents lived in urban areas, while 100.0% lived in rural areas.

There were 774 households in Athens, of which 40.6% had children under the age of 18 living in them. Of all households, 50.3% were married-couple households, 13.4% were households with a male householder and no spouse or partner present, and 29.1% were households with a female householder and no spouse or partner present. About 23.9% of all households were made up of individuals and 11.9% had someone living alone who was 65 years of age or older.

There were 820 housing units, of which 5.6% were vacant. The homeowner vacancy rate was 1.2% and the rental vacancy rate was 3.3%.

Racial composition as of the 2020 census
| Race | Number | Percent |
|---|---|---|
| White | 1,814 | 91.8% |
| Black or African American | 26 | 1.3% |
| American Indian and Alaska Native | 1 | 0.1% |
| Asian | 3 | 0.2% |
| Native Hawaiian and Other Pacific Islander | 0 | 0.0% |
| Some other race | 4 | 0.2% |
| Two or more races | 129 | 6.5% |
| Hispanic or Latino (of any race) | 30 | 1.5% |

=== 2000 census ===
At the 2000 census there were 1,726 people in 695 households, including 462 families, in the city. The population density was 1,175.4 inhabitants per square mile (453.8/km^{2}). There were 740 housing units at an average density of 504.0 per square mile (194.6/km^{2}). The racial makeup of the city was 98.26% White, 0.41% African American, 0.12% Native American, 0.23% Asian, 0.46% from other races, and 0.52% from two or more races. Hispanic or Latino of any race were 1.27%.

Of the 695 households 37.0% had children under the age of 18 living with them, 52.1% were married couples living together, 11.9% had a female householder with no husband present, and 33.5% were non-families. 28.5% of households were one person and 11.7% were one person aged 65 or older. The average household size was 2.48 and the average family size was 3.10.

The age distribution was 28.6% under the age of 18, 8.0% from 18 to 24, 31.3% from 25 to 44, 21.8% from 45 to 64, and 10.3% 65 or older. The median age was 35 years. For every 100 females, there were 84.8 males. For every 100 females age 18 and over, there were 86.7 males.

The median household income was $41,208 and the median family income was $50,272. Males had a median income of $32,375 versus $24,519 for females. The per capita income for the city was $17,981. About 5.4% of families and 6.9% of the population were below the poverty line, including 8.9% of those under age 18 and 13.5% of those age 65 or over.

== Recreation ==
Athens is 4 miles (6 km) north of the north end of the Sangamon Valley Trail right-of-way. The trail includes a bridge over the Sangamon River and Cantrall Creek. Athens has a sports complex that is used for baseball, softball, and football games as well as track & field and cross country events. Athens community members can visit the Athens Community Park that includes baseball diamonds, outdoor basketball hoops, and a football field for youth players.

== Notable people ==
- Jack Brittin: pitcher for the Philadelphia Phillies
- Alice Sudduth Byerly: (1855–1904), temperance activist
- H. V. Porter: educator and member of the Naismith Memorial Basketball Hall of Fame

== See also ==
- List of municipalities in Illinois
