= Joseph Seaver =

American politician

Joseph W. Seaver (July 23, 1793 – August 1, 1864) was an American farmer from Darien, Wisconsin who spent a single one-year term (1853) as a Free Soil Party member of the Wisconsin State Assembly from Walworth County.

== Background ==
Seaver married Mary Long, and the couple had seven children in Genesee County, New York before moving to Walworth County in October 1840. Mary Long Seaver died in August 1850.

At the time of his legislative service, Seaver listed himself as a farmer, 59 years of age, a native of Massachusetts, who had been in Wisconsin for 12 years.

== Public office ==
Seaver was elected Clerk of the first Town meeting of Darien, and would continue to be elected to various Town offices through 1857, along with a number of other Seavers whose exact relationship to Joseph is unknown.

He was elected for the 1853 session from a district which encompassed the Towns of Darien, Delavan and Sharon. He served on the standing committees on town and county organization, and on charitable and religious societies. He was succeeded in 1854 by William P. Allen, a Whig.

== Death ==
Seaver died August 1, 1864, "AGED 71 Yrs. & 9 Ds.", according to his tombstone and is buried in Darien Cemetery.
