= John B. Quimby =

American politician

John B. Quimby was a member of the Wisconsin State Senate.

== Biography ==
An Irish emigrant, Quimby was born on May 15, 1823. Born John Bartlett, he was later adopted by John Quimby and took his family name. He settled in Sauk City, Wisconsin in 1851.

In 1856, Quimby married Sarah E. Leland. They would have eight children. Quimby was a convert to Presbyterianism from Methodism. He died on February 2, 1904.

== Career ==
Quimby represented the 14th District of the Senate during the 1872, 1873, 1874 and 1875 sessions. Additionally, he was District Attorney, Clerk and County Judge of Sauk County, Wisconsin. He was a Republican.
