= John DeWolf (judge) =

- Occupations: Slave-trader, farmer, Justice of the Rhode Island Supreme Court
- Years active: 1818 – 1819

John DeWolf (or D'Wolf; March 18, 1760 – October 10, 1841) was an American slave-trader, farmer, and justice of the Rhode Island Supreme Court from May 1818 to May 1819, appointed from Bristol, Rhode Island.

Born in Bristol, DeWolf was the ninth child of Mark Anthony DeWolf, descended from one of the settlers of the colony. During the American Revolutionary War, he served in William Throope's Company of Bristol militia during the Battle of Rhode Island. After the war, he was a sea captain involved in the American slave trade. He retired from the sea around 1798, and became a successful farmer. He was elected to the Rhode Island General Assembly in 1808. On May 8, 1818, the Rhode Island General Assembly replaced the existing judiciary with a contingent composed of five new members, all Democrats, including DeWolf. After serving on the court, he returned to his private commercial ventures.

DeWolf died in Bristol at the age of 82.

Political offices
Preceded by Court reconfigured	Justice of the Rhode Island Supreme Court; 1819–1822	Succeeded by Luke Drury
